= Gracioso =

Stock character, in Spanish classical theater

The gracioso (pronounced [ɡɾaˈθjoso]) is a clown or jester in Spanish comedy of the 16th century. Clarín, the clown in Pedro Calderón de la Barca's Life is a dream is recognized as a gracioso.

Benjamin Ivry describes the gracioso as "scatological, sexual, anti-feminist, anti-Semitic, and a vehicle for wild, anti-heroic satire. A gross trickster with license to every obscenity, a gracioso could also be poignant, but mostly he burlesqued eroticism by declaring as identical hermaphrodites, homosexuals and eunuchs".

Northrop Frye identified him as a type of tricky slave.

Alborada del gracioso, the fourth movement of Miroirs (1904–05) by Maurice Ravel, is a musical portrait of a gracioso.

The gracioso was a low ranking character in Spanish Renaissance theatre, who would serve a master. This master would generally be the hero of the play. The gracioso was a point of relatability for lower class audiences.

The gracioso was also a character that would be relatively progressive by present day standards. As they would be more accepting of the situation at hand. One example is in the play “Don Gil de las Calzas Verdes” by Tirso de Molina where the character Doña Juana has been acting as multiple people with different genders. The gracioso character in the play takes notice to this fluidity of gender with the character, but does not call any importance to it due to their own otherness.

The Playwright Lope De Vega is the self-proclaimed inventor of the gracioso. It is likely that the gracioso came from the stock character of the Arleccino from traveling Italian theatre troupes performing Commedia Dell’Arte.

Along with the gracioso, there was its female counterpart the graciosa who served a similar role. She was also a servant type of character who had a female master. As with the gracioso, An important function that the graciosa served was by being a point of connection to the all-female section of the audience, who would be a great factor in whether a play was successful or not.

There was a character that sprouted from the gracioso, which was called the sacristan. This offspring of the gracioso was a tool of satire writing for playwrights. The sacristan would not engage in criticizing, but its own existence was usually the criticism. It would be the idea itself that the playwright wanted to criticize. One of the big ideas it would criticize would be religion. As with the gracioso, the sacristan was an anti-Semetic character. An example is the character Tristán from the play “Los Baños de Argal” by Miguel de Cervantes Saavedra.
