= Richard Flexmore =

Richard Flexmore [real name Richard Flexmore Geatter] (1824–1860), was a British clown and pantomimist of the Victorian era.

Flexmore was the son of Richard Flexmore Geatter, a well-known dancer who died at an early age. Flexmore was born at Kennington in London on 15 September 1824. At the age of eight he commenced his theatrical career at the Victoria Theatre, where his juvenile drollery soon attracted attention. In 1835 he appeared at a small theatre which then existed in Chelsea in a fantastic piece called ‘The Man in the Moon,’ and danced very effectively a burlesque shadow dance. He subsequently became a pupil of a Mr. Frampton, and showed great aptitude for stage business in his own peculiar line.

As a grotesque dancer his services soon became in request at various theatres, and in 1844 he appeared as the Clown at the Grecian Saloon. The following winter he made his first great hit when taking the part of Clown at the Olympic Theatre, which was then under the management of T. D. Davenport. His wonderful activity and abundant flow of animal spirits quickly became recognisable, and he was then engaged for the Princess's Theatre, where he remained for several seasons.

On 28 July 1849 at St. Mary's parish church, Lambeth, he married Francisca Christophosa, daughter of Jean-Baptiste Auriol, the famous French clown, and with her acted with great success in the chief cities of Europe. After this he appeared at the Strand, the Adelphi, and Covent Garden theatres, and later at Drury Lane, where he performed in the pantomime ‘Jack-in-the-Box’ at Christmas 1859. He was especially noted for his close and natural imitation of the leading dancers of the day, such as Perrot, Carlotta Grisi, Taglioni, Cerito, and others; but although chiefly known as a dancing clown, he could when required also take the part of clown à la Grimaldi in a very efficient manner, and was one of the most diverting pantomimists who ever delighted a holiday audience.

In 1859 Harry Payne was playing a bear when he had to take over as Clown in the middle of a performance because Flexmore had collapsed. Although Flexmore's physical strength and activity were remarkable, he overtaxed his powers to obtain the applause of the public, and brought on a consumption, of which he died at 66 Hercules Buildings, Lambeth, London, on 20 August 1860, and was buried at Kensal Green Cemetery on 27 August.

His widow, who married again to a cousin on her father's side, died two years after Flexmore, in Paris on 3 September 1862. His mother, Ann Flexmore Geatter, whom he had supported for many years, died on 26 December 1869, aged 88.
