= William Payne (pantomimist) =

English actor and pantomimist (1804–1878)

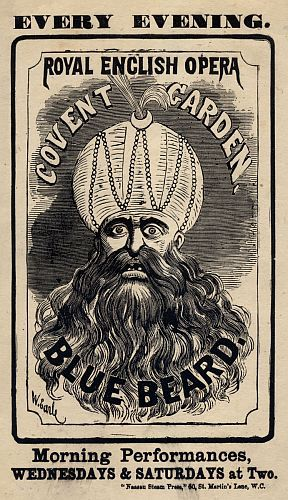
Payne in the title role in Bluebeard (1860)

William Henry Schofield Payne (1804–18 December 1878) was an actor, dancer and pantomime artist, who created much of the stage business connected with the character Harlequin in 19th-century harlequinades. He was the father of the Victorian era pantomime clowns the Payne Brothers.

== Life and career ==
Born in the City of London in 1804, W H Payne was apprenticed to Isaac Cowen, a stockbroker; but in his eighteenth year he ran away, and joined a travelling theatrical company in the Warwickshire circuit. He rose to play small parts at the Theatre Royal, Birmingham. Returning to London, he studied under Grimaldi and Bologna at Sadler's Wells Theatre, and then obtained an engagement at an East-end theatre, and in the following year (1825) migrated to the Pavilion Theatre. Here he remained some years, playing small parts, which he raised into importance by the admirable expression of his pantomimic action. At Christmas he represented the character Clown, with Miss Rountree (afterwards his first wife) as Columbine. Payne would wear a partial mask, so contrived that the play of his features could be seen. This was little more than a nose and forehead, and sometimes a separate chin. On 26 December 1831 he made his first appearance at the Covent Garden Theatre in the pantomime Hop o' my Thumb and his Brothers by Charles Farley, in which he played Madoc Mawr, the Welsh ogre, Miss Poole being Little Jack, and Priscilla Horton (afterwards Mrs German Reed) the Genius of the Harp. The next year he was still more successful in the pantomime produced on 26 December of Puss in Boots, in which his character was Tasnar, chief of the Long Heads and No Bodies.

During his long career Payne played many parts, ranging from pantomime to tragedy. He was Harlequin to Joseph Grimaldi's Clown at Sadler's Wells in 1827; he was Dandy Lover to young J. S. Grimaldi's Clown, and made a capital Clown himself. He acted in tragedy with Charles Mayne Young, Charles Kemble and Edmund Kean, and on Kean's last appearance (Covent Garden, 25 March 1833), when playing Othello, and unable to finish the part through illness, it was Payne, then acting Ludovico, who carried him off the stage. He prominently figured in grand ballet with Pauline Leroux, Fanny Cerrito, Carlotta Grisi, Fanny and Therese Elssler and other dancers of note, and played in state before George IV, William IV, Victoria, Napoleon III and the Empress Eugénie.

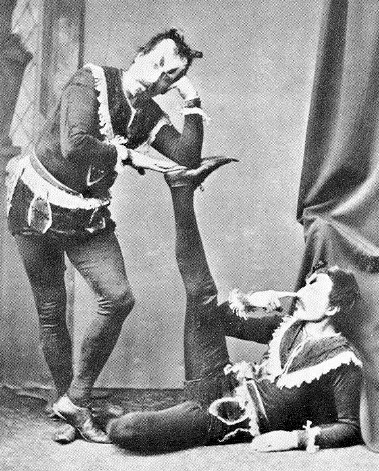
Payne's sons, The Payne Brothers: Harry (left) and Fred

In 1836 Payne was stage manager at the Pavilion Theatre in Whitechapel, and in 1841 he was back at Covent Garden and filled the rôle of Guy, Earl of Warwick, in the pantomime produced at Christmas. On 31 March 1847 he opened at Vauxhall Gardens in a ballet with his wife and his sister, Miss Annie Payne. In 1848 he was engaged by John Knowles for the Theatre Royal, Manchester, and here he remained seven years, increasing the annual run of the pantomime from its usual twenty-four nights to one hundred, and making Robinson Crusoe so attractive that it was represented 125 nights consecutively. On leaving Manchester he appeared with his sons at Sadler's Wells in the pantomime of the Forty Thieves at Christmas 1854. Latterly the Payne family were regularly engaged for Covent Garden, where they became the chief actors and pantomimists in the openings, as well as the contrivers and performers of the harlequinades. They were also frequently seen at the Standard Theatre, the Crystal Palace, and other places.

At Christmas 1860 Payne played the title role in Bluebeard; or, Harlequin and Freedom in Her Island Home at the Covent Garden Theatre. Through the whole of his career Payne's private virtues commanded the respect of the profession. In his later years as his powers as a mime faded Payne moved into speaking roles in Victorian burlesque.

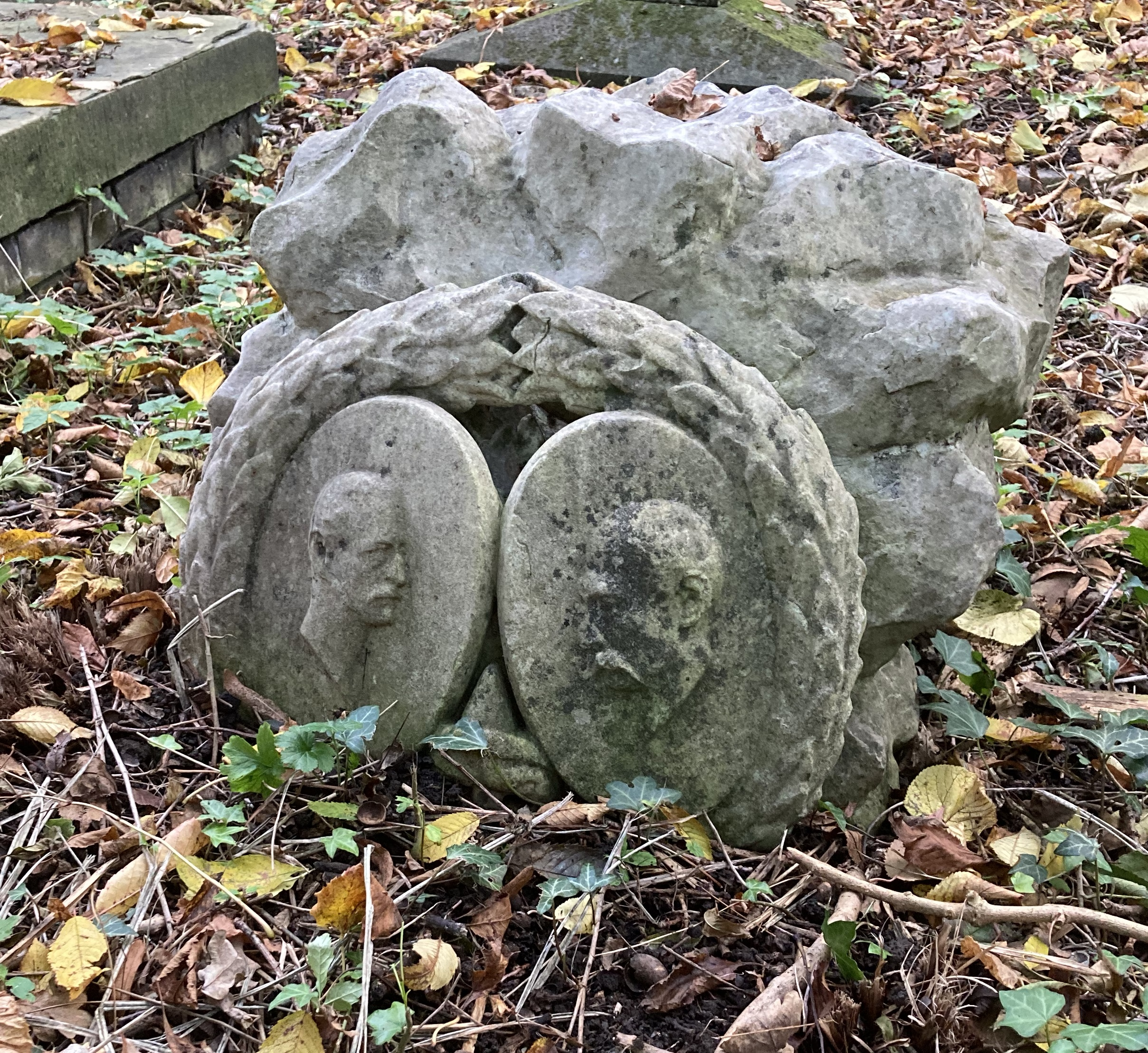
Family grave in Highgate Cemetery

He died at Calstock House, Dover, on 18 December 1878 and was buried on the western side of Highgate Cemetery. A writer in The Spectator said: ‘The last true mime has departed in the person of W. H. Payne.’

== Family ==
By his first wife Payne had four children: Harriet Farrell, who married Aynsley Cook (both were opera singers); Annie, a dancer and actress, who married William Turner; Harry (1833–1895), pantomimist and Clown; and Fred (1841–1880), pantomimist and Harlequin; both sons performed with their father at times.
