= Tricky slave =

Stock character of a clever lower-class person

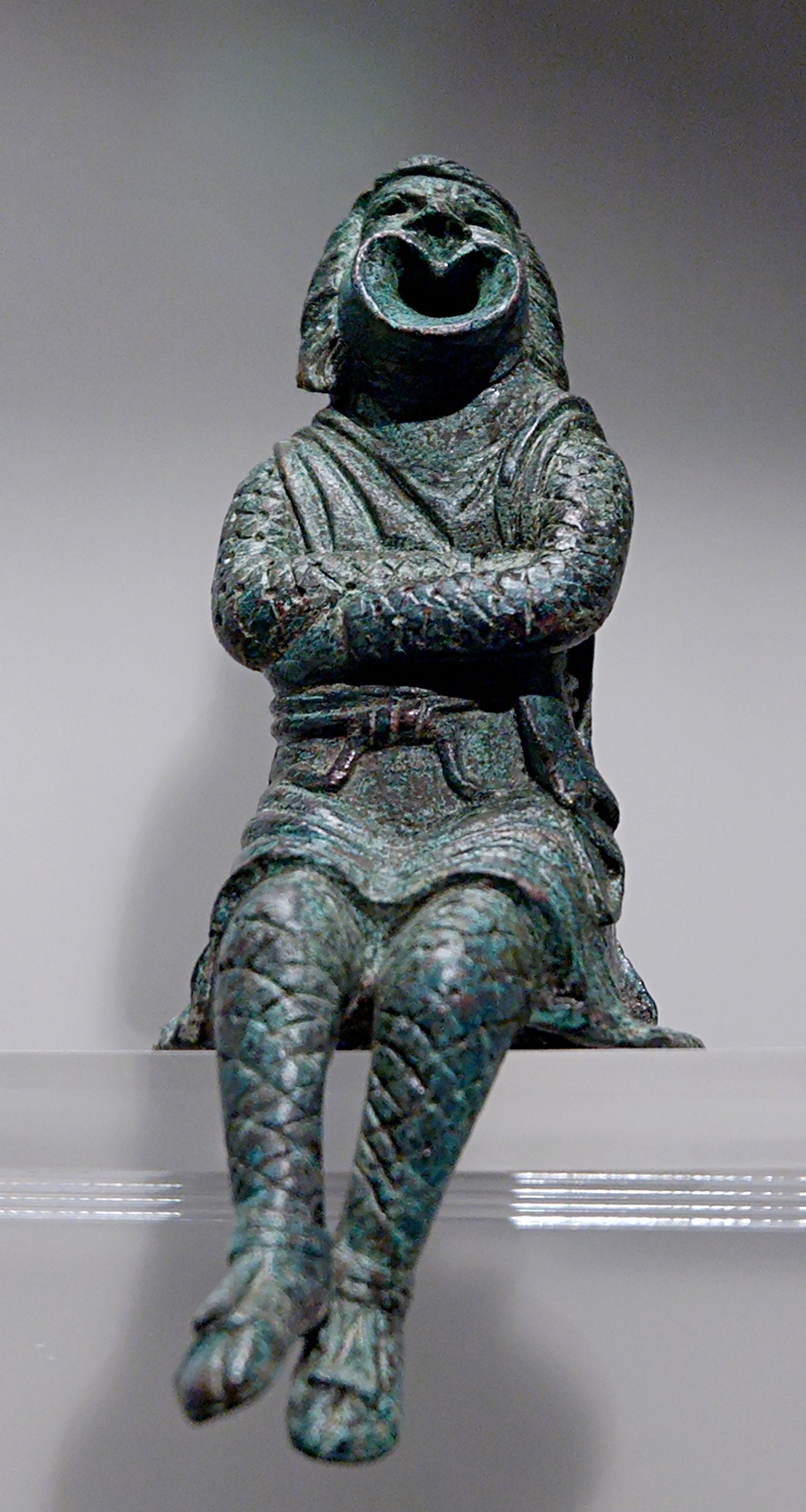
Actor playing a slave and wearing a comic mask. Bronze statuette, early 3rd century AD.

The tricky slave is a stock character. He is a clever, lower-class person who brings about the happy ending of a comedy for the lovers. He is more clever than the upper-class people about him, both the lovers and the characters who block their love, and typically also looking out for his own interests. In the New Comedy, the tricky slave (dolosus servus or servus callidus) aimed to get his freedom by assisting his young master in love.

== Renaissance depictions as the gracioso, the zanni, the Puss-in-Boots, and Figaro ==
Besides the actual slaves of classical theater, he also appears as the scheming valet in Renaissance comedy, called the gracioso in Spanish. The zanni of Commedia dell'arte are often tricky slaves, as are Puss-in-Boots in Perrault's fairy tale, Jeeves in P. G. Wodehouse's work, Figaro in the opera The Barber of Seville and Serpina in the opera La serva padrona.

== Counterparts in fairy tales ==
In fairy tales, the same function is often fulfilled by fairy godmothers, talking animals, and like creatures.

== A type of the eiron ==
Northrop Frye identified him as a central portion of the Myth of Spring comedy and a type of eiron character.

== Depiction as Morgiana in One Thousand and One Nights ==
Besides Serpina, another female version of the tricky slave would be Morgiana, a clever slave girl from "Ali Baba and the Forty Thieves" in the One Thousand and One Nights (Arabian Nights). She is initially in Cassim's household but on his death she joins his brother Ali Baba and through her quick-wittedness she saves Ali's life many times and eventually kills his worst enemy, the leader of the Forty Thieves. As reward, Ali frees her and Morgiana marries Cassim's son.

== Korean depiction of the Cunning Servant ==
There is a Korean folktale of The Cunning Servant.
