= Payne Brothers =

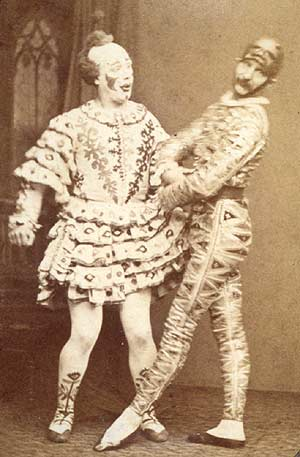
The Payne Brothers – Harry (left) as Clown and Fred as Harlequin, c. 1875

Harry Payne (25 November 1833 – 27 September 1895) and Frederick Payne (January 1841 – 27 February 1880) were members of a popular Victorian era of British pantomime entertainers. They were billed as The Payne Brothers.

Fred Payne became known for portraying Harlequin, and Harry became famous as Clown in the Harlequinade that followed Victorian pantomimes. Together, the brothers appeared in Gilbert and Sullivan's first collaboration, Thespis, in 1871. Gilbert made references to the brothers in two of his Bab Ballads.

== Biography ==
Henry Edward Payne and Frederick Alexander Payne were the sons of William Payne, a classic pantomime artist, who invented much of the 19th-century Harlequinade action. Known as "the King of Pantomime", he trained with Joseph Grimaldi and the great Harlequin, Jack Bologna, at Sadler's Wells Theatre, and starred at Covent Garden in the 1830s and 40s. The dancing of the Payne Brothers was so celebrated that W. S. Gilbert referred to it in two of his comic Bab Ballads, "The Bishop of Rum-ti-Foo" and "The Bishop of Rum-ti-Foo Again". When the Paynes appeared in The Grand Duchess at the Gaiety Theatre in 1871, a reviewer in The Olio wrote, "People go rather to see the eccentric dancing than to hear the eccentric music. However, in justice to the latter, it may be urged that we have all heard enough of the Grand Duchess, while we are all agreed that we would never see sufficient of the Payne pantomimists – perhaps, taken for all in all, the best in the world."

=== Harry Payne ===
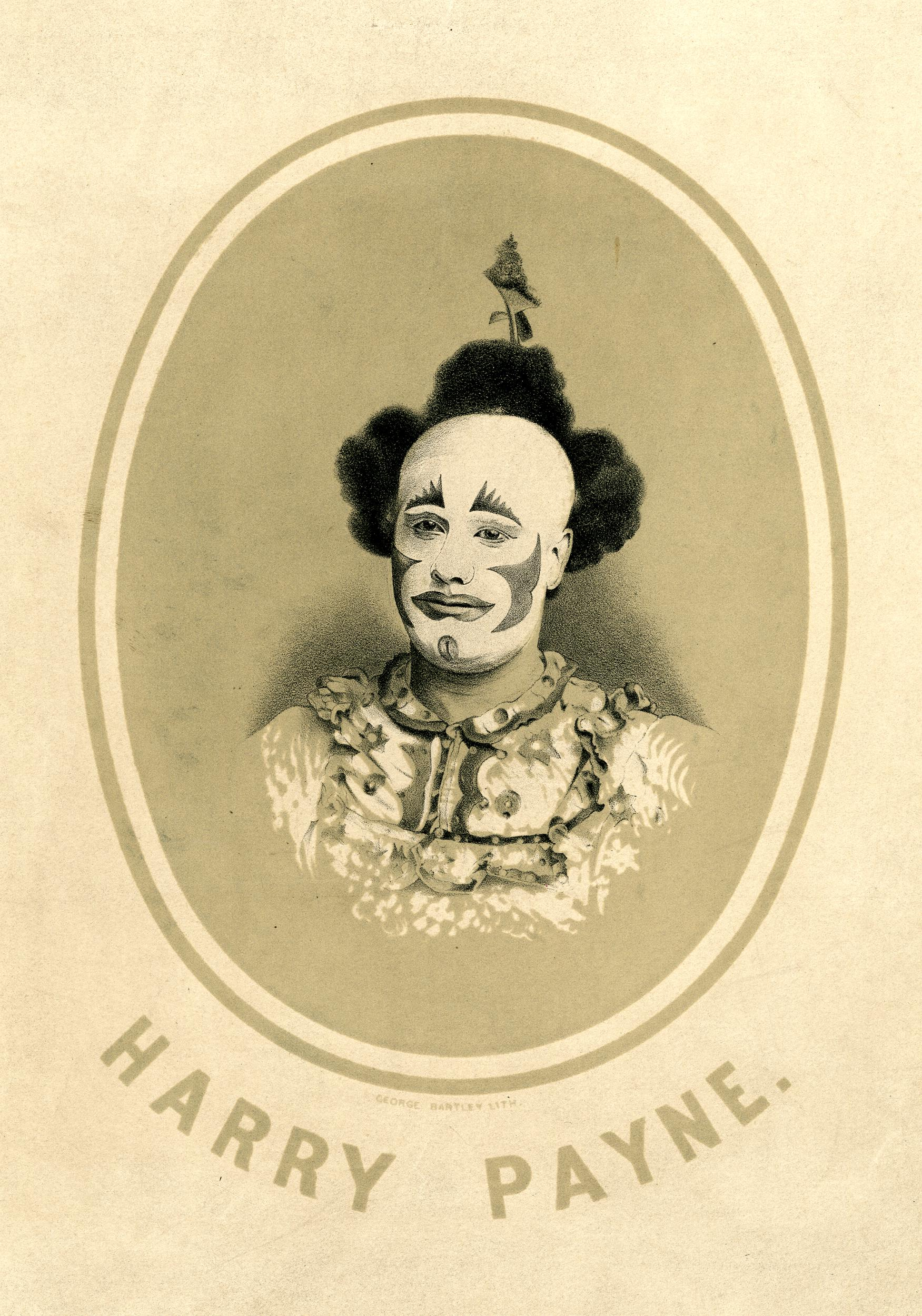
Harry Payne

Harry Payne began his career playing Harlequin at Covent Garden. In 1859 he was playing a bear, and he had to take over as Clown in the middle of a performance when Richard Flexmore collapsed. He was so successful in the role that he remained as Covent Garden's Clown until the 1870s. After other appearances, including one with his brother Fred in Gilbert and Sullivan's Thespis in 1871, choreographed by their father, he went to Drury Lane in 1883, where he played Clown for the last twelve years of his life.

In 1892 Punch said of him:

Mr. Harry Payne's scene, besides coming earlier than usual, is, in itself, full of fun of the good old school-boyish kind; and if the Public, as Jury, is to award a palm to either competitor, then it must give a hand – which is much the same thing as "awarding a palm" – to its old friend, Harry Payne, who, with Tully Lewis as Pantaloon, has pulled himself together, and given us a good quarter of an hour of genuine Old English Pantomime.

Harry Payne was described by George Grossmith as "the best clown in my time". Harry Payne opened each Boxing Day Harlequinade at Drury Lane with a somersault followed by a cheerful "Here we are again!"

Harry Payne was responsible for the creation of one of the biggest Christmas crackers ever to be made in the Victorian era. He was appearing as Clown in a Drury Lane pantomime when the cracker was delivered. It was over seven feet in length and contained a change of costume for the whole cast as well as hundreds of small crackers that the cast threw to the children in the audience, to their great excitement.

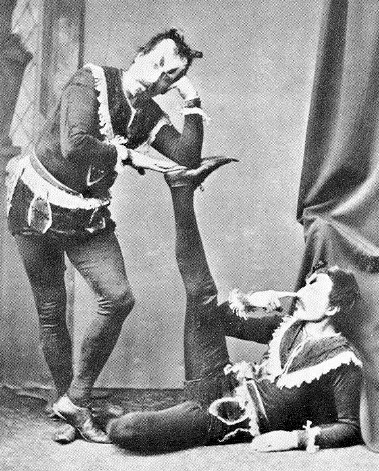
Harry (left) and Fred Payne

Harry Payne died at the age of 62 and was buried in the family grave at Highgate Cemetery. The Times said of him, "Mr. Payne was at once an actor, a singer, and an accomplished humourist. Probably he owed something to the tuition of his father … whose mimetic feats he would seek to emulate as much as the altered conditions of pantomime entertainments would permit."

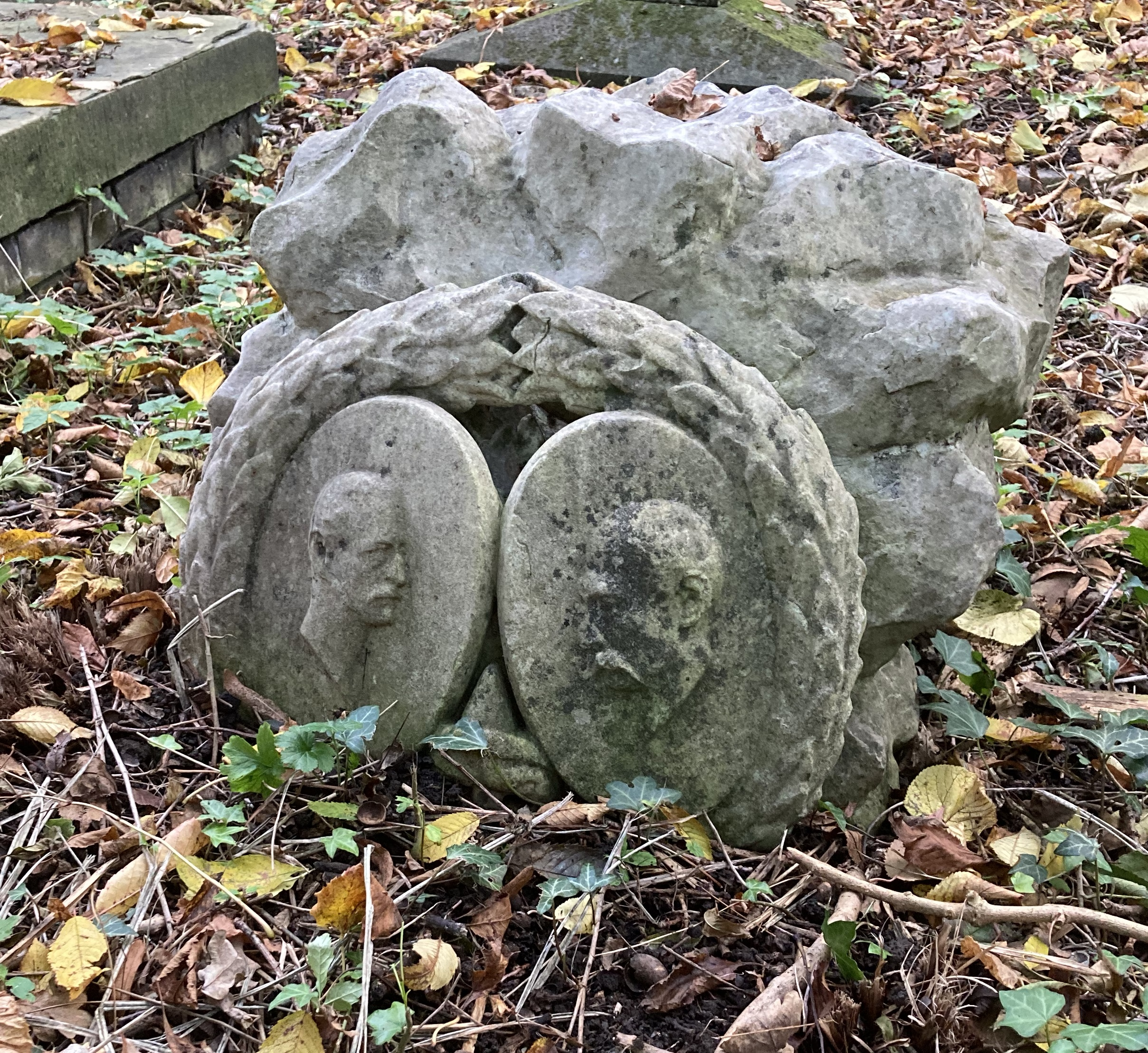
Payne family grave in Highgate Cemetery

=== Fred Payne ===
When his father, W H Payne, appeared as Baron Pompolino in Drury Lane's Cinderella in 1865, Fred Payne played his valet, Pedro. The two:

"[were] provided with several scenes in which their inimitable pantomimic acting is seen to advantage. It would be difficult to find anything more truly humorous of its kind, than a combination of a fantastic hornpipe and an equally fantastic minuet, danced by Mr. Frederick Payne in the Baron's kitchen.... After the elephant, comes Donato – the great one-legged dancer, and after Donato comes an ingenious three-legged dance by the Paynes – an old pantomimic trick which has not been seen for many years."

Payne senior appeared with both his sons in Saint George and the Dragon at Covent Garden in 1864. Fred continued to perform with his father into the 1870s; they appeared together in 1874 in Cinderella at The Crystal Palace as Pompolino and Pedro. With his brother Harry, Fred appeared regularly at the Theatre Royal, Manchester.

In 1877, while engaged in the pantomime at the Alexandra Palace, he became what the newspaper The Era called mentally "affected", and he never fully recovered from this affliction. He died at 3 Alexandra Road, Finsbury Park, London, on 27 February 1880, aged only 39.
