= Weihnachtsmärchen =

German Christmas plays for children

Weihnachtsmärchen (Christmas fairy tale) are plays for children, which are an inherent part of the theatre season in the German-speaking parts of Europe.

The theatres show fairy tales by the Brothers Grimm and Hans Christian Andersen, A Christmas Carol by Charles Dickens, adaptations of The Wizard of Oz and further adventures of Pippi Longstocking or Alice in Wonderland during the Adventszeit to placate the children until Christmas. Operas or ballets like Hänsel and Gretel and Der Nussknacker are performed concurrently for the same audience.

This tradition is comparable with pantomime in the English-speaking world, having much less cross-dressing and slapstick.
