= The Cunning Servant =

Korean folktale

The Cunning Servant (Kkoejaengi hain) is a comical Korean folktale about a cunning young servant who keeps tricking his master, even into marrying his master’s daughter, and ends up living happily ever after. As a socially underprivileged figure, the protagonist relies solely on his skills to turn the tables and achieve success, which tends to offer a sense of mental liberation from conventions and authority.

== History and transmission ==
Kkoejaengi nain is a folktale widely passed down throughout the Korean peninsula and more than twenty variations of the story can be found in major Korean folktale collections including Hanguk gubi munhak daegye (한국구비문학대계 Compendium of Korean Oral Literature). Trickster tales in which a subordinate plays tricks on a superior commonly exist all over the world. In Korea, Seunim gwa sangjwa (스님과 상좌 A Monk and a Senior Acolyte) in Yongjae chonghwa (용재총화 Yongjae’s Essay Collection) qualifies as a trickster tale. Considering how widespread Kkoejaengi hain is in Korea, the tale is likely to have been orally transmitted among people for hundreds of years. The tale must have been particularly popular during the second half of the Joseon dynasty when aristocrats had weaker authority and became targeted by the public.

== Plot ==
=== Summary ===
A nobleman from the countryside set out on a trip to Seoul with a young servant as his groom. The nobleman tried to intimidate the servant by warning him that Seoul was a vicious place where it was easy to have one’s nose sliced off alive. During their journey, the servant came up with cunning ways to play pranks on his master. When delivering a meal, he said his snot accidentally fell into the soup as he stirred it in front of his master, which disgusted the master enough to give the food away to the servant. With another meal, the servant presented it with a burning hot spoon that made the master yelp in surprise and pain, allowing the servant to take the food away to enjoy it himself. Once, the servant secretly ate his master’s lunch, relieved himself in the lunch box, and told his master that the food had gone stale and turned into feces.

Upon arriving in Seoul, the master went out on business. The servant left behind sold the horse and sat with his eyes shut and hands covering his nose. When the master asked where the horse was upon his return, the servant said he didn’t realize the horse was gone for he was worried that someone might slice his nose off now that they were in Seoul. The furious master wrote the message “Drown him when he returns” on the servant’s back and sent him home. On his way back to his master’s house in the countryside, the servant tricked a woman milling into giving him some green barley. He also tricked a merchant selling honey into making honey-filled rice cakes with the green barley. The servant took the rice cakes and offered them to a monk in exchange for having the message on his back corrected to “Let him marry my daughter when he returns.” The servant then went home to show the message to his master’s family and became married to his master’s daughter. When the master later returned home, he became enraged to find that his daughter had been wed to the servant. The master forced the servant into a sack and hung the sack on a tree beside a pond to let the servant die. The servant, however, spotted a one-eyed brassware peddler passing by and tricked the peddler into believing that the sack would heal his blind eye. The peddler took the servant’s place inside the sack and ended up drowning in the pond. After a while, the servant came back to his master’s house and bragged about how wonderful it was to stay at the dragon’s palace underneath the pond. Overcome with the desire to see the dragon’s palace for themselves, the master and his family jumped into the pond and drowned. The master’s daughter was also about to jump into the pond, but the servant talked her out of it and lived to enjoy his master’s wealth with his wife.

=== Variation ===
This tale’s protagonist is referred to as a servant but is sometimes given more folksy names such as Makdongi, Aetteugi, Tteogeori, Gageori, or Wangguljangguldae. The tale is also told as a story about a real-life figure such as Bang Hak-jung, Kim Bok-seon, and Jin Pyeong-gu. Kkoejaengi hain is told as a full narrative as well as in short episodes featuring a prank the protagonist plays on the master. There are diverse types of pranks, but the story commonly includes the pranks involving stealing the master’s food and selling the master’s horse. Some variations start by telling that the servant held a grudge against his master for trying to take his mother away. The tale’s conclusion also varies, one in which the master’s daughter kills her husband to avenge the death of her family. This ending is a rare variation for depicting the servant in a negative light.

== Features and significance ==
The protagonist in Kkoejaengi hain is the archetype of a trickster in Korean folktales. A trickster is a borderline personality that does not hesitate to go against rules, customs, norms, and boundaries. For this reason, storytellers often have scruples about tricksters for being cruel or vulgar. Tricksters stand on a borderline and portray a different view of the world, providing an opportunity to tear down all that has been established by human society and allow a new order to emerge. However, they never take part in actually creating a new order.

In Kkoejaengi hain, the master and his family are not the only ones to be tricked by the protagonist. Other commoners fall victim to the protagonist’s pranks such as the milling woman, the merchant selling honey, or the brassware peddler. Instead of dealing with a specific enemy, the protagonist takes on the world and clears his own path, which demonstrates self-centered vanity and unrestricted freedom from collective morals or duties. The servant’s actions in this tale carries meaning in terms of the ontology involving the strong and the weak rather than good and evil.

== Related works ==
The outline of the socially weak servant overthrowing the socially strong to gain a wife and property in Kkoejaengi hain shares commonalities with the German folktale The Brave Little Tailor in which a tailor tricks giants and the king, marries the princess, and becomes the ruler of a kingdom. The episode about causing the master to drown is similar to a development in the German fairy tale The Little Peasant. Among Korean fables, this folktale’s protagonist resembles the hare in Tokki wa geobugi (토끼와 거북이The Hare and the Tortoise) as well as in Horangi wa tokki (호랑이와 토끼The Tiger and the Hare) or the quail in Yeou wa mechuragi (여우와 메추라기The Fox and the Quail).

== Additional sources ==
- “The Cunning Servant’s Tricks,” Compendium of Korean Oral Literature 2-6, pp.311-316.
- “Tteogeori, the Servant Who Humiliated His Master,” Compendium of Korean Oral Literature 7-9, pp.1016-1021.
- “The Trickster Makdongi,” Compendium of Korean Oral Literature 7-15, pp.485-487.
- “The Cunning Servant’s Tricks,” Compendium of Korean Oral Literature 1-1, pp.513-522.
