= Harlequinade =

British comic theatrical genre

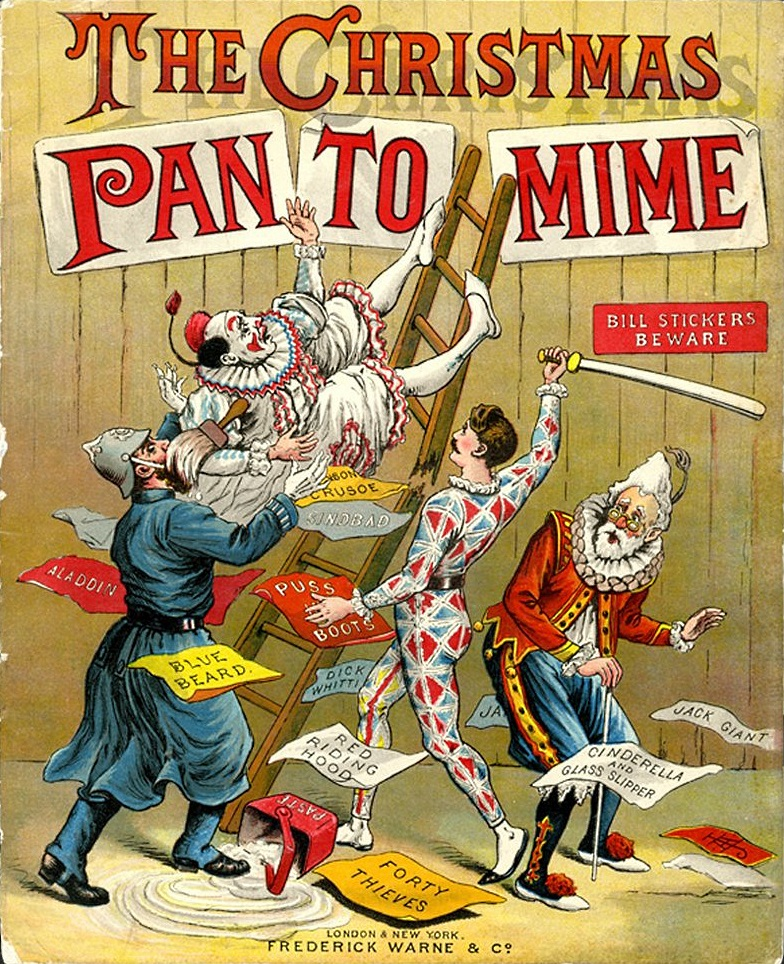
An 1890 bookcover showing the harlequinade characters

Harlequinade is an English comic theatrical genre, defined by the Oxford English Dictionary as "that part of a pantomime in which the harlequin and clown play the principal parts". It developed in England between the 17th and mid-19th centuries. It was originally a slapstick adaptation or variant of the commedia dell'arte, which originated in Italy and reached its apogee there in the 16th and 17th centuries. The story of the Harlequinade revolves around a comic incident in the lives of its five main characters: Harlequin, who loves Columbine; Columbine's greedy and foolish father Pantaloon (evolved from the character Pantalone), who tries to separate the lovers in league with the mischievous Clown; and the servant, Pierrot, usually involving chaotic chase scenes with a bumbling policeman.

Originally a mime (silent) act with music and stylised dance, the harlequinade later employed some dialogue, but it remained primarily a visual spectacle. Early in its development, it achieved great popularity as the comic closing part of a longer evening of entertainment, following a more serious presentation with operatic and balletic elements. An often elaborate magical transformation scene, presided over by a fairy, connected the unrelated stories, changing the first part of the pantomime, and its characters, into the harlequinade. In the late 18th and 19th centuries, the harlequinade became the larger part of the entertainment, and the transformation scene was presented with increasingly spectacular stage effects. The harlequinade lost popularity towards the end of the 19th century and disappeared altogether in the 1930s, although Christmas pantomimes continue to be presented in Britain without the harlequinade.

== History ==
=== 16th to 18th centuries ===
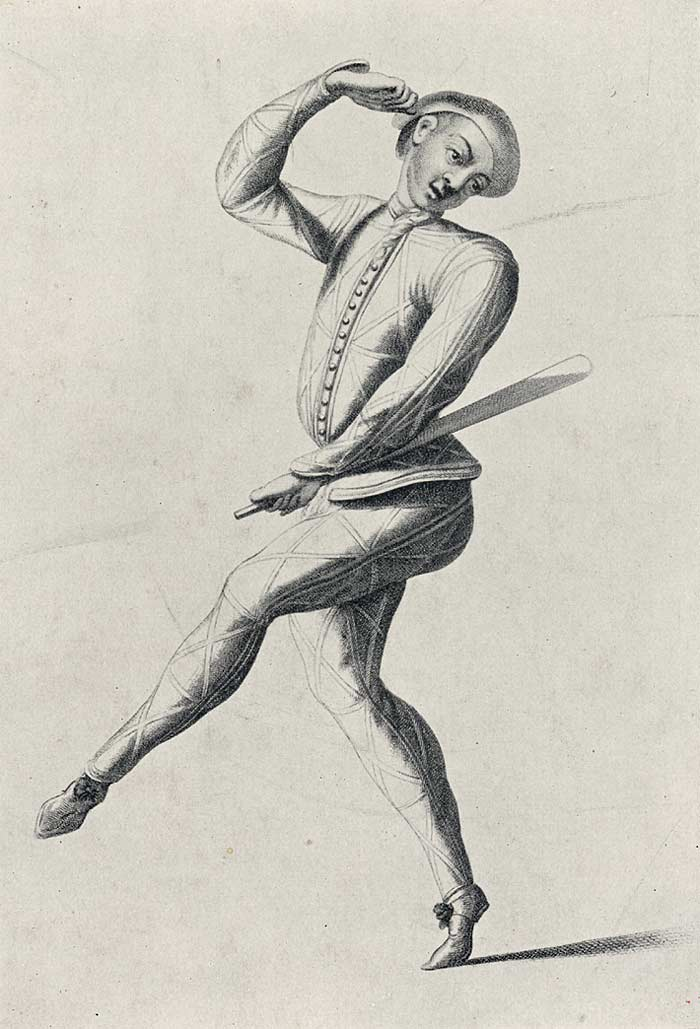
John Rich as Harlequin with batte, c. 1720

During the 16th century, commedia dell'arte spread from Italy throughout Europe, and by the 17th century adaptations of its characters were familiar in English plays. In English versions, harlequinades differed in two important respects from the commedia original. First, instead of being a rogue, Harlequin became the central figure and romantic lead. Secondly, the characters did not speak; this was because of the large number of French performers who played in London, following the suppression of unlicensed theatres in Paris. Although this constraint was only temporary, English harlequinades remained primarily visual, though some dialogue was later admitted.

By the early years of the 18th century, "Italian night scenes" presented versions of commedia traditions in familiar London settings. From these, the standard English harlequinade developed, depicting the eloping lovers Harlequin and Columbine, pursued by the girl's foolish father, Pantaloon, and his comic servants. The basic plot remained essentially the same for more than 150 years. In the first two decades of the century, two rival London theatres, Lincoln's Inn Fields Theatre and the Theatre Royal, Drury Lane, presented productions that began seriously with classical stories with elements of opera and ballet and ended with a comic "night scene". In 1716 John Weaver, the dancing master at Drury Lane, presented "The Loves of Mars and Venus – a new Entertainment in Dancing after the manner of the Antient Pantomimes". At Lincoln's Inn, John Rich presented and performed as Harlequin in similar productions. The theatre historian David Mayer explains the use of the "batte" or slapstick and the "transformation scene":

Rich gave his Harlequin the power to create stage magic in league with offstage craftsmen who operated trick scenery. Armed with a magic sword or bat (actually a slapstick), Rich's Harlequin treated his weapon as a wand, striking the scenery to sustain the illusion of changing the setting from one locale to another. Objects, too, were transformed by Harlequin's magic bat.

Rich's productions were a hit, and other producers, like David Garrick, began producing their own pantomimes. For the rest of the century this pattern persisted in London theatres. When producers ran short of plots from Greek or Roman mythology they turned to British folk stories, popular literature and, by 1800, nursery tales. But whatever the story shown in the first part of the entertainment, the harlequinade remained essentially the same. At the end of the first part, stage illusions were employed in a spectacular transformation scene, initiated by a fairy, turning the pantomime characters into Harlequin, Columbine and their fellows.

=== 19th century and later ===
In the early 19th century, the popular comic performer Joseph Grimaldi turned the role of Clown from "a rustic booby into the star of metropolitan pantomime". Two developments in 1800, both involving Grimaldi, greatly changed the pantomime characters: For the pantomime Peter Wilkins: or Harlequin in the Flying World, new costume designs were introduced. Clown traded in his tatty servant's costume for a flamboyant, colourful one. In Harlequin Amulet; or, The Magick of Mona, later the same year, Harlequin was modified, becoming an increasingly stylised romantic character leaving the mischief and chaos to Grimaldi's Clown.

Clown now appeared in a range of roles, from the rival suitor to household cook or nurse. Grimaldi's popularity changed the balance of the evening's entertainment, with the first, relatively serious, section soon dwindling to what Mayer calls "little more than a pretext for determining the characters who were to be transformed into those of the harlequinade." In the 19th century, theatrical presentations typically ran for four hours or more, with the pantomime and harlequinade concluding the evening after a long drama. The pantomimes had double titles, describing the two unconnected stories such as "Little Miss Muffet and Little Boy Blue, or Harlequin and Old Daddy Long-Legs."

Illustration of the Harlequinade in The Forty Thieves (1878), showing Swell, Pantaloon, Harlequin, Columbine (above), Clown and Policeman

In an elaborate scene initiated by Harlequin's "slapstick", a Fairy Queen or Fairy Godmother transformed the pantomime characters into the characters of the harlequinade, who then performed the harlequinade. Throughout the 19th century, as stage machinery and technology improved, the transformation of the set became more and more spectacular. Once the transformation was complete, Clown would announce: "Here We Are Again". The setting was usually a street scene containing several stage traps, trick doors and windows. Clown would jump through windows and reappear through trap doors. He would steal sausages, chickens and other props which he would stuff into his pockets, later dividing these unfairly with an accomplice. He would grease the doorstep of a butcher's shop with butter to outwit his pursuers. Usually there was not much spoken dialogue, but much business with a "red hot poker". Harlequin would use his magic wand or staff to turn a dog into sausages and a bed into a horse trough, to the surprise of the sleeping victim. Clown would dive into a clock face, which would show no sign of entry.

The harlequinade lost popularity by the 1880s, when music hall, Victorian burlesque, comic opera and other comic entertainments dominated the British comedy stage. In pantomime, the love scenes between Harlequin and Columbine dwindled into brief displays of dancing and acrobatics, the fairy-tale opening was restored to its original pre-eminence, and by the end of the 19th century the harlequinade had become merely a brief epilogue to the pantomime. It lingered for a few decades longer but finally disappeared completely by the middle of the 20th century. The last harlequinade was played at the Lyceum Theatre in 1939.

== Characters ==
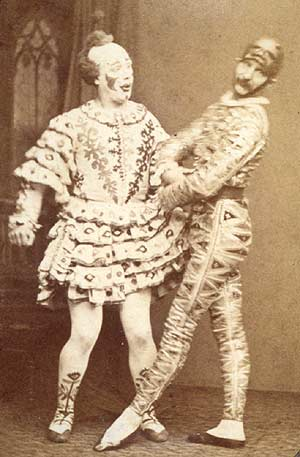
The Payne Brothers as Clown and Harlequin, c. 1875

The harlequinade characters consisted of the following five kinds of clowns, in addition to more minor characters like a policeman:

=== Harlequin ===
Harlequin is the comedian and romantic male lead. He is a servant and the love interest of Columbine. His everlasting high spirits and cleverness work to save him from difficult situations into which his amoral behaviour leads during the course of the harlequinade. In some versions of the original commedia dell'arte, Harlequin is able to perform magic feats. He never holds a grudge or seeks revenge.

John Rich brought the British pantomime and harlequinade to great popularity in the early 18th century and became the most famous early Harlequin in England. He developed the character of Harlequin into a mischievous magician who was easily able to evade Pantaloon and his servants to woo Columbine. Harlequin used his magic batte or "slapstick" to transform the scene from the pantomime into the harlequinade and to magically change the settings to various locations during the chase scene.

In 1800, at Drury Lane, in Harlequin Amulet; or, The Magick of Mona, Harlequin was modified to become "romantic and mercurial, instead of mischievous". During the 19th century, Harlequin became an increasingly stylised character that performed certain dance poses. Later in the century, Fred Payne and Harry Payne, known as the Payne Brothers, were the most famous Harlequin and Clown, respectively, of their day.

=== Columbine ===
Columbine (Colombina in Italian) is a lovely woman who has caught the eye of Harlequin. In the original commedia dell'arte she was variously portrayed as a Pantaloon's daughter or servant. In the English harlequinade she is always Pantaloon's daughter or ward. Her role usually centres on her romantic interest in Harlequin, and her costume often includes the cap and apron of a serving girl, though (unlike the other players) not a mask.

=== Clown ===
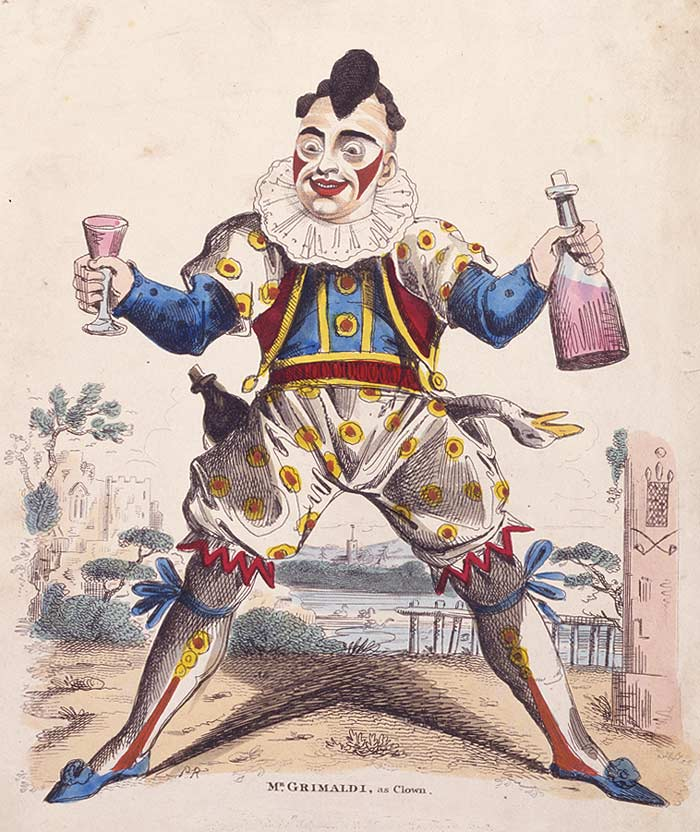
Grimaldi as Clown, c. 1810

Originally a foil for Harlequin's slyness and adroit nature, Clown was a buffoon or bumpkin fool who resembled less a jester than a comical idiot. He was a lower class character, the servant of Pantaloon, dressed in tattered servants' garb. Despite his acrobatic antics, Clown invariably slowed Pantaloon in his pursuit of the lovers. However, two developments in 1800, both involving Joseph Grimaldi, greatly changed the pantomime characters. Grimaldi starred as Clown in Charles Dibdin's 1800 pantomime Peter Wilkins: or Harlequin in the Flying World at Sadler's Wells Theatre. For this elaborate production, Dibdin introduced new costume designs. Clown's costume was "garishly colourful ... patterned with large diamonds and circles, and fringed with tassels and ruffs", instead of the tatty servant's outfit that had been used for a century. The production was a hit, and the new costume design was copied by others in London. Later the same year, at the Theatre Royal, Drury Lane, in Harlequin Amulet; or, The Magick of Mona, Harlequin was modified, becoming "romantic and mercurial, instead of mischievous", which left Grimaldi's Clown as the "undisputed agent" of chaos. Clown became more important, embodying anarchic fun, and no longer simply a servant of Pantaloon. Grimaldi built the character up into the central figure of the harlequinade. He developed jokes, catch-phrases and songs that were used by subsequent Clowns for decades after his retirement in 1828, and Clowns were generically called "Joey" for four generations after him.

Clown became central to the transformation scene, crying "Here we are again!" and so opening the harlequinade. He then became the villain of the piece, playing elaborate, cartoonish practical jokes on policemen, soldiers, tradesmen and passers-by, tripping people with butter slides and crushing babies, with the assistance of his elderly accomplice, Pantaloon. The American George Fox, popularly known as G. L. Fox, became interested in pantomime and made Clown a popular character in the Humpty Dumpty story, with which he toured North America during the middle 19th century.

=== Pantaloon ===
In commedia dell'arte, Pantaloon (Pantalone in Italian) was a devious, greedy merchant of Venice. He is taken in readily by the various tricks and schemes of Harlequin. Pantaloon's costume usually included red tight-fitting vest and breeches, slippers, a skullcap, an oversized hooked nose, and a grubby grey goatee. Pantaloon was familiar enough to London audiences for Shakespeare to refer to him at the turn of the 17th century as the exemplar of an elderly man, "the lean and slippered Pantaloon".

In the English harlequinade, Pantaloon emerged as the greedy, elderly father of Columbine who tries to keep the lovers separated but was no match for Harlequin's cleverness. His servant Clown's antics, however, slowed him in his pursuit of the lovers. Later, Pantaloon became Clown's assistant.

=== Pierrot ===
Pierrot (Pedroline) was a comic servant character, often Pantaloon's servant. His face was whitened with flour. During the 17th century, the character was increasingly portrayed as stupid and awkward, a country bumpkin with oversized clothes. During the 19th century, the Pierrot character became less comic, and more sentimental and romantic, as his hopeless adoration for Columbine was emphasised. Also in the 19th century, Pierrot troupes arose, with all the performers in whiteface and baggy white costumes.

== Costume ==
The costumes consisted of the following:

- Originally, a black mask, which allowed the actor to lift it and reveal himself sometimes. Other times it is lowered to keep the actor from the audience's view. It has tiny eyeholes and quizzically arched eyebrows. Later, some characters wore whiteface, and the British pantomime characters originally wore masks that they then removed for the transformation to the harlequinade.
- Traditional diamond chequered trousers (usually alternating blue, green, and red diamonds)
- Peasant's shirt
- Batte, or slapstick (carried by Harlequin)

== Adaptations ==
Although the original commedia dell'arte characters inspired many stage works, novels and short stories, there were fewer works that drew on the characters of the English tradition. They include Harlequin and Mother Goose, or The Golden Egg (1806) by Thomas John Dibdin and Harlequin and the Fairy's Dilemma (1904) by W. S. Gilbert.

== Sources ==
- Chaffee, Judith and Olly Crick (2015). The Routledge Companion to Commedia dell'Arte. Routledge. ISBN 978-0-415-74506-2.
- McConnell Stott, Andrew (2009). The Pantomime Life of Joseph Grimaldi. Edinburgh: Canongate Books. ISBN 978-1-84767-761-7.
- Neville, Giles (1980). Incidents In the Life of Joseph Grimaldi. London: Jonathan Cape Ltd. ISBN 978-0-224-01869-2.
- Smith, Winifred (1964). The Commedia dell'Arte. New York: Benjamin Blom, Inc.
