= J. S. Grimaldi =

English stage actor, comedian and dancer (1802–1832)

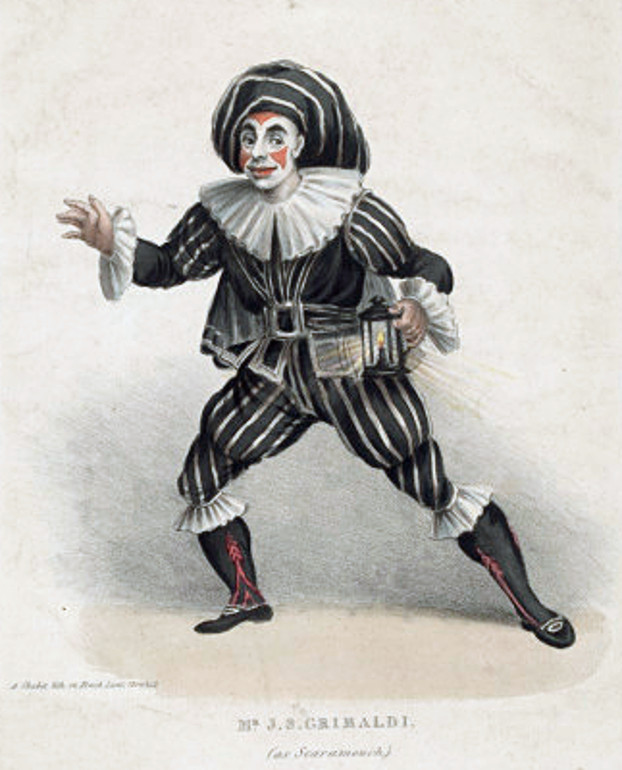
Joseph Samuel "JS" Grimaldi

Joseph Samuel William Grimaldi (21 November 1802 – 10 December 1832), better known as J. S. Grimaldi or JS Grimaldi, was an English stage actor, comedian and dancer who frequently played the role of Clown in the harlequinades that accompanied nineteenth-century pantomimes. He was the son of Joseph Grimaldi, who popularised the role of Clown in the early 1800s.

The young Grimaldi began his career in 1814 playing in Don Juan and other roles at the Theatre Royal, Drury Lane, Sadler's Wells and Covent Garden. Throughout his teenage years, he was a successful performer, starring in Harlequin and Fortunio; or, Shing-Moo and Thun-Ton (1815), The Fates; or, Harlequin's Holy Day (1818) and Harlequin and Friar Bacon (1820), but he grew to resent the often unfavourable comparisons made between him and his famous father.

Grimaldi turned increasingly to alcohol over the years, becoming unreliable, abusive and ultimately unemployable. He was mostly unemployed throughout his 20s, making his final appearance in a revival of Don Juan in 1832. He died later that year at the age of 30.

== Biography ==
=== Early life and career ===
Grimaldi was born in Clerkenwell, London, to the actor Joseph Grimaldi and his dancer wife Mary Bristow. Grimaldi's father popularised the role of Clown in the harlequinade of the early 1800s and invented the modern conception of the whiteface clown. His father introduced Grimaldi to the eccentric atmosphere at both Drury Lane and Sadler's Wells from the age of 18 months. Although eager to have Joseph Samuel follow him onto the stage, his father felt that it was important for the boy to have an education and enrolled him at Mr Ford's Academy, a boarding-school in Putney, which taught the children of theatrical performers. JS excelled at school and became fluent in French. After Ford's Academy, he attended a private school in Pentonville.

Young Grimaldi made his professional debut on 10 October 1814, shortly before his 12th birthday, as Friday in a pantomime version of Robinson Crusoe at the Sadler's Wells Theatre opposite his father, who played the title character. Although his father was initially against the idea of his young son becoming a performer, he saw the boy's promise when he starred alongside him in the piece. He became known professionally as JS Grimaldi. Later in 1814, Grimaldi made his second professional appearance, playing the part of Scaramouche in a hugely profitable pantomime of Don Juan at the Sadler's Wells Theatre, while his father played the title role. The success of the piece confirmed, in his father's mind, that Grimaldi was more than capable of sustaining his own career.

=== Adolescence ===
In 1814, Grimaldi's father fell ill. The seizure kept Joseph Grimaldi house bound for four months, and the theatre's receipts fell by £50 (equivalent to £3,400 in 2025) as a result. This left the 12-year-old JS to perform, for the first time, without his father by his side. The challenge resulted in an improvement in the boy's performing skills. The following year, Grimaldi and his father performed together in Harlequin and Fortunio; or, Shing-Moo and Thun-Ton, the first pantomime known to have featured a principal boy. Grimaldi played Miniature Clown opposite his father, who played Adult Clown.

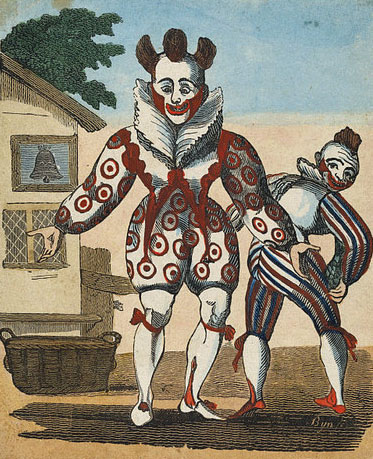
Grimaldi (right) with his father Joseph

JS enjoyed a successful performing career throughout his teenage years. In 1818 his father took over the running of Sadler's Wells and offered Grimaldi the role of Clown in The Fates; or, Harlequin's Holy Day, opposite his parents and the comedian Jack Bologna. Grimaldi and his father also toured together. After a few productions in 1819, Sadler's Wells Theatre was sold, and Grimaldi toured Ireland with his father in 1820. That September, he appeared in a version of Aladdin, followed by the Christmas pantomime Harlequin and Friar Bacon in which he played Friar Bacon. Both were staged at Covent Garden theatre, with the pantomime being particularly successful. In May 1821, Joseph Grimaldi collapsed on stage from exhaustion during a performance of Undine; or, the Spirit of the Waters. His doctors diagnosed the 42-year-old performer as suffering from "premature old age". JS took over his father's role and completed the remainder of the show's run. Now acting as his father's official understudy, Grimaldi fulfilled many of his father's theatrical engagements, including a revival of Harlequin and Friar Bacon 1821 and Harlequin and Mother Bunch; or, the Yellow Dwarf, both in 1821.

Grimaldi made a career of emulating his father's act and received favourable notices as a clown, but his success was constantly overshadowed by that of his father. As his career blossomed, he was increasingly and unfavourably compared with his more famous father in terms of personality and acting ability. The comparisons affected his self-confidence. Grimaldi's desire to distance himself professionally from his famous father had intensified during their constant touring of the provincial theatres together. Grimaldi heard of an outrage committed in 1820 by the actor Robert Bradbury, who assaulted a heckler in his audience. Bradbury gained a rebellious reputation because of it; something which appealed greatly to Grimaldi, as it was an act so far removed from his father's gentle reputation. During the 1821 pantomime Harlequin and Mother Bunch, Grimaldi caused a scandal and was censured for threatening and verbally abusing an audience member who criticised his performance.

=== Decline ===
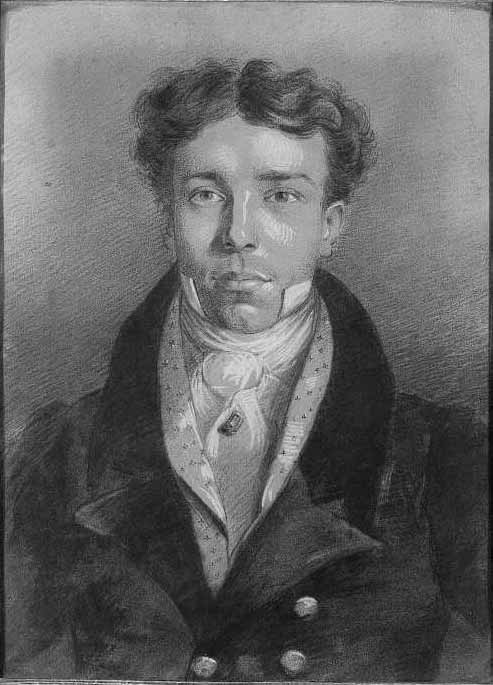
J.S. Grimaldi later in his career

The critical comparisons between Grimaldi and his father adversely affected their personal relationship. By the early 1820s, Grimaldi became resentful of his father and publicly shunned any association with him. JS turned to alcohol, becoming increasingly unreliable, and theatre managers were reluctant to hire him. He survived two suicide attempts: in 1821 he cut his throat, and two years later he lacerated himself on a window. Fortunes at Sadler's Wells were also dwindling, with lessees failing to mount new engagements, leaving Grimaldi out of work. His alcoholism effectively ended his career as he became abusive to colleagues and undependable.

From 1823 to 1827, Grimaldi went out of his way to avoid seeing his parents. They communicated only through written correspondence, with Grimaldi often sending his father letters begging for money. Grimaldi stated to his father that "At present I am in difficulties; but as long as I earn a shilling you shall have half." Grimaldi finally returned home in 1827, when his parents were awakened one night to discover their son standing in the street, feverish, emaciated and dishevelled. His parents took him in and managed to secure him a number of brief theatrical engagements, including a few Christmas pantomimes and benefits for his father.

Grimaldi's lack of a steady income eventually led to him being incarcerated in a debtors' prison. Upon his release on 3 March 1831, he moved in with his parents, who again tried to find him employment; their efforts failed because he did not appear for rehearsals. Grimaldi soon reverted to his old ways and often abused his parents' charitable nature by bringing home prostitutes and fighting with his alcoholic friends within the house. He moved out later that year.

His final performance was at the Tottenham Street Theatre in a production of Don Juan, in 1832, playing the part of Scaramouche.

=== Death ===
Grimaldi died at age 30 on 11 December 1832 in Tottenham and was interred at Whitefield's Tabernacle. The cause of his death remains a mystery and was treated with some suspicion. Although he had been an alcoholic and had suffered from epilepsy and bouts of mental illness for many years, there were suspicions that he had been poisoned or had died as a result of injuries sustained in a drunken brawl. His parents were devastated by his death and attempted suicide but survived. His mother died in 1834, and his father died in 1837.

== Sources ==
- Boz (Charles Dickens) (1853). Memoirs of Joseph Grimaldi. London: G Routledge & Co.
- Findlater, Richard (1955). Grimaldi King of Clowns. London: MacGibbon & Kee. OCLC 558202542.
- Stott, Andrew McConnell (2009). The Pantomime Life of Joseph Grimaldi. Edinburgh: Canongate Books Ltd. ISBN 978-1-84767-761-7.
- Neville, Giles (1980). Incidents in the Life of Joseph Grimaldi. London: Jonathan Cape Ltd. ISBN 0-224-01869-8.
