= Henry Krokatsis =

English artist

- Born: London, England
- Education: Liverpool Polytechnic, Liverpool; Royal College of Art, London
- Known for: Sculpture, Public Art, Painting

Henry Krokatsis (born July 1965) is an English artist, based in London. Krokatsis works with a wide range of materials, from smoke, found wood, broken glass, and antique mirrors, creating objects that oscillate between the "destitute and the divine". He has had numerous solo exhibitions, his work has been shown in Guggenheim Collection Venice, City Gallery Prague, De La Warr Pavilion, The New Art Gallery Walsall, among others. In 2015 Krokatsis was invited by the Danish Museum, Ordrupgaard, to create a show using works from their collection of the iconic Danish painter Vilhelm Hammershøi and his own 'mirror works'.

== Life and work ==
=== Education ===
In 1985 Krokatsis attended Liverpool Polytechnic, where he received his BA Fine Art, graduating in 1988. In the same year he went on to attend the Royal College of Art, completing his MA in Painting in 1990.

=== Work ===
Krokatsis works with a wide range of materials, often found or otherwise redundant materials such as broken mirrors, used votive candles, reclaimed wood, and antique mirrors. "I used the remnants of Votive candles. Someone comes to church and makes a prayer. There are often two inches left after the candle is burnt though. Those bits are thrown away and I collect them. You take your fresh candle and it’s only for your prayer. It’s an object invested with belief and hope. It’s the medium for intense spiritual outpouring but the remaining bits are just chucked." The use of votive candles can be seen in works such as See Better Daze, 2008, a pair of huge stag antlers mounted on a bronzed mirror, moulded from the stubs of 4,321 votive candles, collected over the course of a year.

Krokatsis’ smoke drawings reflect these concerns: made from the smoke from a burning rag held over a cutout template, the artist controls and directs the intensity of the fumes, creating different layers, surfaces and contrasts, but the process is also exposed to the contingency of chance and accident. The resultant images have a haunting, residual quality, partly due to their often ambiguous subject matter, as if the record of some event, image or memory revealed unknowingly over time.

‘this is not art to make sense of the world – it is an act of faith, it’s art as a spell’.

=== Public works ===
Krokatsis has been commissioned on various occasions to produce public works, such as the permanent memorial for Joseph Grimaldi, Joseph Grimaldi Park, Islington, Helter Skelter Lighthouse, Eastnor Castle, and Turning Tree, in Ladywell Fields, Lewisham, Kabin for Frieze sculpture park in Regent's Park and Confiteor for Ordrupgaard Sculpture garden, Copenhagen.

In 2013 Krokatsis won a 'hotly-contested' commission from Hastings Borough Council, to produce a public sculpture to adorn the town's seafront. His proposed 13 m (42 ft) polished aluminium Helter Skelter, with the texture of rough-hewn wood, beat out competition from Marcus Harvey, Oliver Marsden, Marete Masrusman, Graham Rich, and St Clair de Cemin. However the £100,000 commission was later axed by Hastings Borough Council after a backlash from a small number of "nostalgia fetishists" living locally, who disliked the proposed sculpture. Krokatsis received "vitriolic hate mail" and a crude 12 metre high replica of his Helter Skelter was burned at annual Hastings bonfire celebration.

=== Personal life ===
Krokatsis, whose work often explores religious themes, has a mixed religious background. Krokatsis is the son of a Greek Orthodox father, and a Jewish mother, and a practitioner of Taoist Baguazhang moving meditation.

== Art market ==
Krokatsis is represented by David Risley Gallery, Copenhagen, Galeria Leme, São Paulo, Brazil, and Vigo Gallery, London.

== Bibliography ==
- You'll Never Know: drawing and random interference, Henry Krokatsis and Jeni Walwin, Hayward Gallery Publications, ISBN 1 85332 254 7
- Henry Krokatsis-Outlier's Antidote, published by Gang of Virtue Ltd. Text by John Stezaker
