= S Bannister =

British equestrian performer and tightrope walker (born 1787)

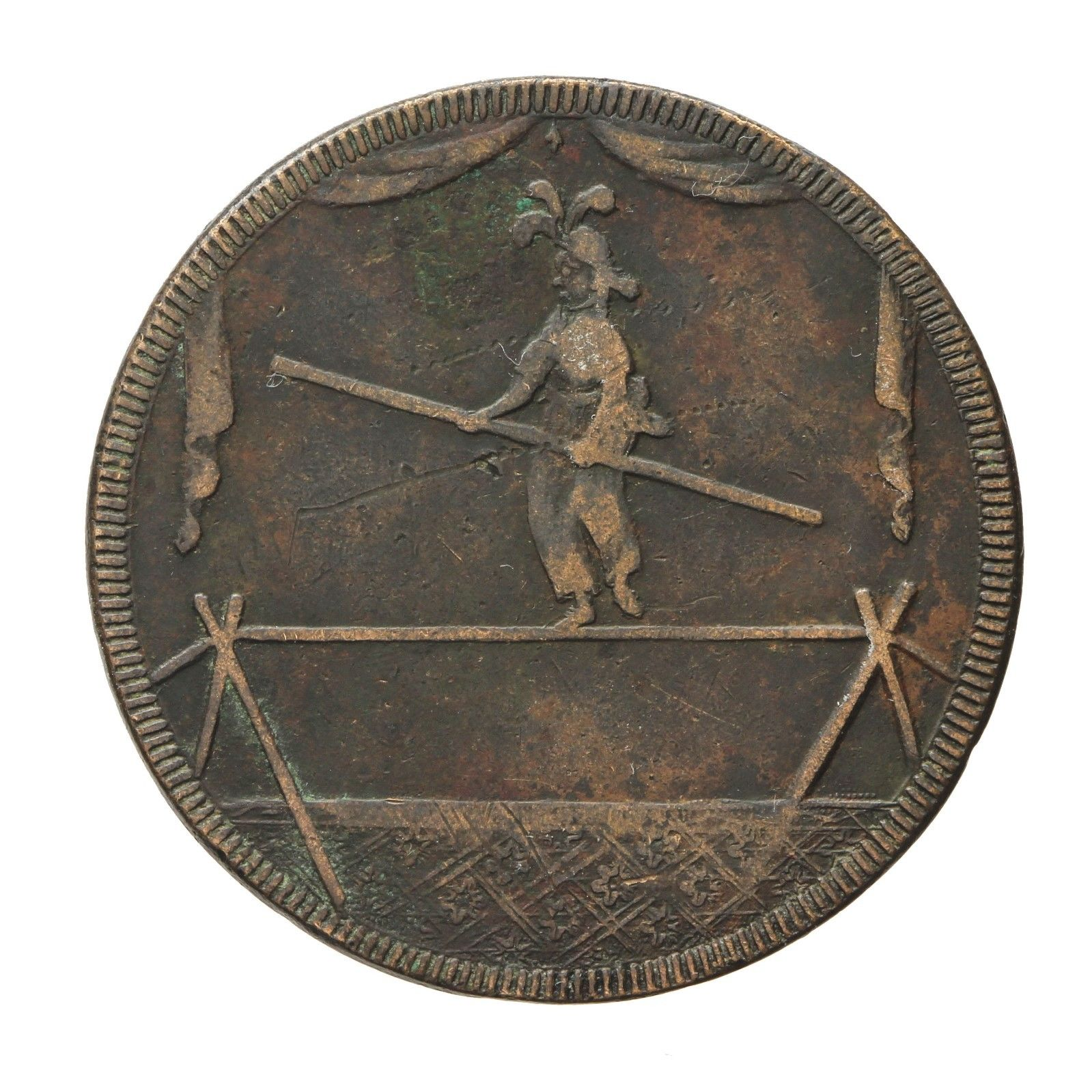
- A ticket token for Bannister's shows
- Born: 1787
- Died: unknown
- Occupation: circus performer
- Known for: horse riding and tight rope walking
- Spouse: Mr Wilson or Mr Clough
- Parent: James Banister
- Relatives: Mary Banister

S Bannister (born 1787) was an early British equestrian performer and tightrope walker. Her sister Mary Bannister was also an equestrian performer (with swords).

== Life ==
Bannister was born in 1787. She was the daughter of James Bannister and she had a sister named Mary. Her father was one of the first people to take a circus on tour in Britain. When his equestrian show arrived in Stamford in 1804 she was with him. She and the circus toured in Scotland and Northern England until her father went bankrupt (he later died in 1836).

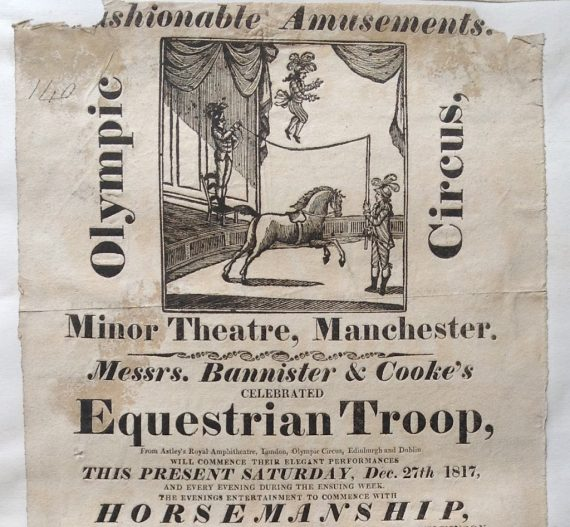
A poster for the "Olympic Circus" and "Equestrian Troupe"

Her riding and tightrope skills however were said to create "much celebrity" and she went to work at Britain's first circus, Astley's Amphitheatre. When Astley died in 1821 she was the head horserider and she stayed and worked for the new manager, William Davis, and then for Charles Dibdin. She disappears from the records after marrying Edward Wilson. Although another source says that she married not Wilson but Clough and she appeared as Mrs Clough.

== Mary Bannister ==
Her younger sister Mary was also an accomplished equestrian performer and she was known for showing off her skills with swords whilst riding horses. She would train women to ride but she was known for appearing at Covent Garden and in pantomime. She retired after she married the tightrope dancer Thomas Wilson. She died in Camberwell on 20 November 1877.
