= Jean-Baptiste Dubois (actor) =

French actor, comedian, dancer and singer

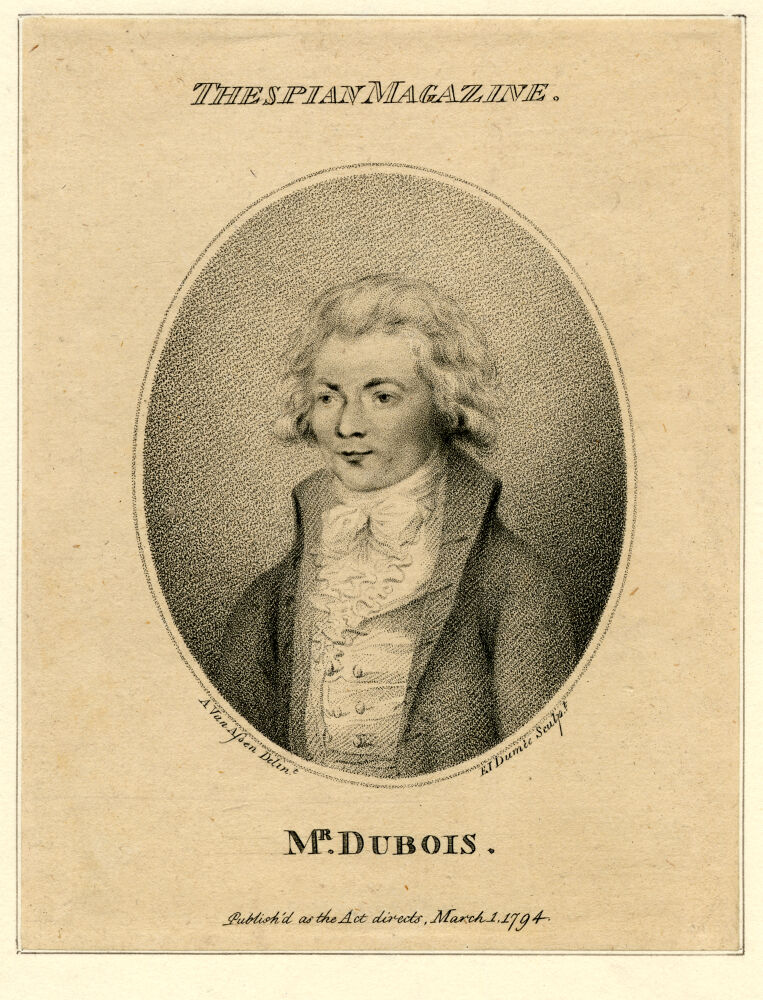
1794 portrait of Dubois.

Jean-Baptiste Dubois (French: [ʒɑ̃ batist dybwa]; 1762 – 1814, 1817, or 1818) was a French actor, comedian, dancer and singer who was dominant in the London harlequinade. He may have been the first to advertise himself as a "clown" in England, and popularized the genre.

== Biography ==
Dubois came to England in the 1770s, performing first at Astley's Amphitheater in 1782. By 1788, he was regularly appearing at Sadler's Wells, and he made his debut at the more upper-class Theatre Royal, Drury Lane on 26 December 1789.

During the 1790s, Dubois was the pre-eminent harlequinade Clown in London productions. During that period, he mentored Joseph Grimaldi, although Grimaldi later denied this. Grimaldi later overtook Dubois in popularity and brought the role of Clown to general prominence.

In the 1792–1793 season at Drury Lane, Dubois was paid £4 weekly (equivalent to £501 in 2025), and his salary rose to £6 weekly (£624 in 2025) in the fall of 1795. However, amidst his declining popularity and gradual replacement by Grimaldi, Dubois' name began to be dropped from the bills at Drury Lane on 26 January 1796. This, combined with his wife's recent passing, caused Dubois to leave for America to perform at the John Street Theatre.

By the time Dubois returned to London later that year, Grimaldi's reputation had been developing as a stronger performer, and Dubois struggled to be cast in meaningful roles. Dubois performed at various venues around London through 1809, but at that point, Grimaldi had succeeded him as the primary Clown in London.

Dubois had two sons, Charles and Joseph. Dubois mentored Charles in the performing arts, and Charles joined him in performances from the late 1790s to early 1800s.

== Bibliography ==
- Stott, Andrew McConnell (30 October 2008). The Pantomime Life of Joseph Grimaldi. Canongate Books. ISBN 978-1847678164.
- Findlater, Richard (1955). Grimaldi, king of clowns (1st ed.). Macgibbon & Kee. OCLC 3610035.
- Highfill, Philip H.; Burnim, Kalman A.; Langhans, Edward A. (1975). A Biographical Dictionary of Actors, Actresses, Musicians, Dancers, Managers, and Other Stage Personnel in London, 1660-1800. Vol. 4. SIU Press. OCLC 44958787.
