= American International Church =

Church in London, England

Coordinates: 51.521036°N 0.135427°W

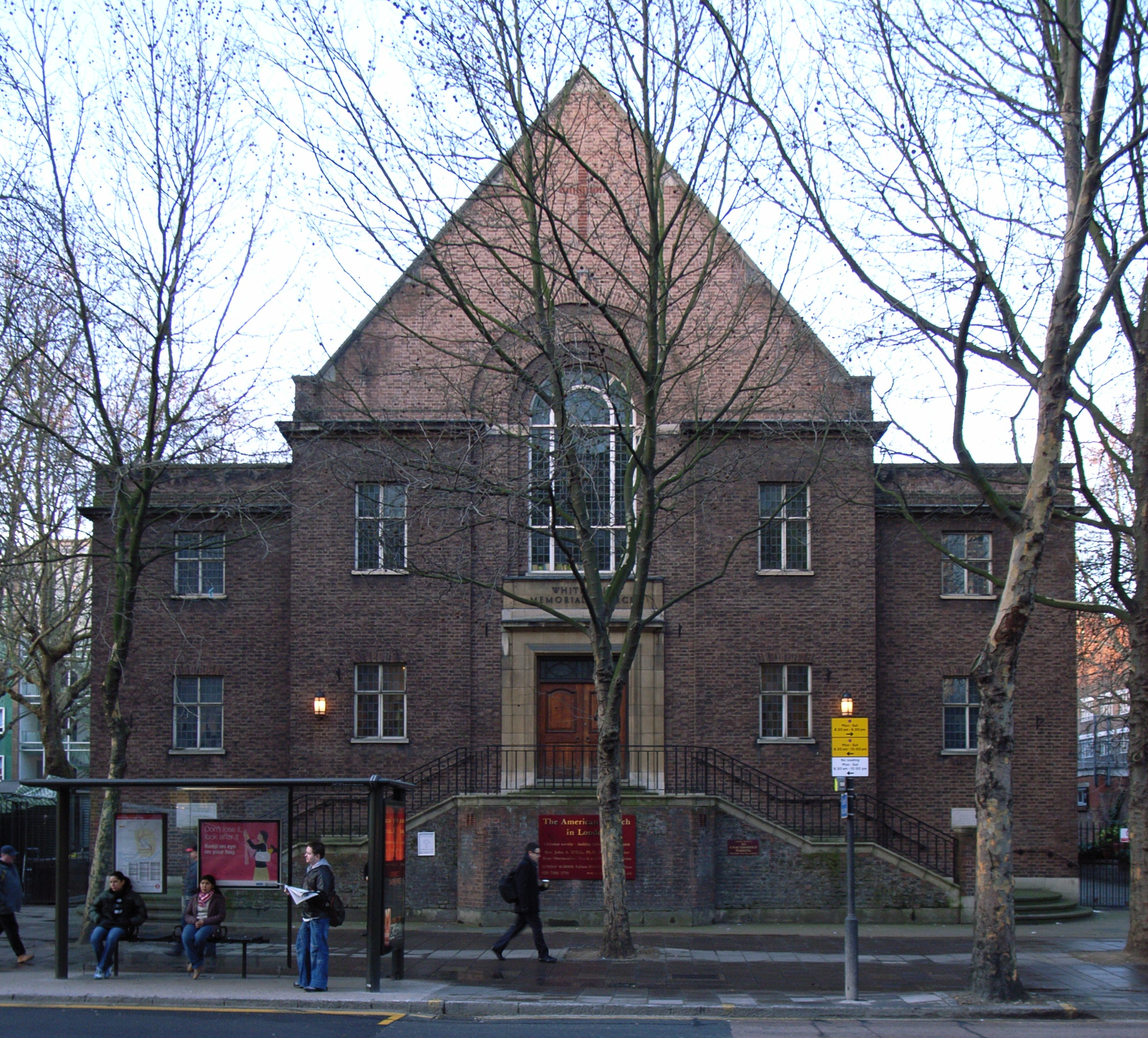
- Whitefield Memorial Church, home of the American International Church
- American International Church
- Denomination: United Reformed Church
- Website: amchurch.co.uk

Architecture
- Years built: 1756, rebuilt 1957

The American International Church, currently located at the Whitefield Memorial Church on Tottenham Court Road in London, was established to cater for American expatriates resident in London. Organised in the American denominational tradition, the church was originally named the American Church in London but changed its name in 2013 to reflect that it caters to approximately 30 different nationalities.

The church is particularly known for its soup kitchen, which feeds around 70 people per day.

== Whitefield Memorial Church ==
The first chapel on the site was built in 1756 for Evangelical preacher George Whitefield. It was enlarged in 1759. John Wesley preached a sermon "On the death of the Rev Mr George Whitefield" both there and at Whitefield's Tabernacle, Moorfields, in 1770.

The original chapel stood on the west side of Tottenham Court Road, between Tottenham Street and Howland Street, surrounded by fields and gardens. Its foundation stone was laid by Whitefield in June 1756, and it opened for its dedication service on 7 November of the same year. Its initial popularity led to plans being drawn up for enlargement, and these were quickly put into effect in 1759. Beneath the chapel, a vault was also prepared; it was Whitefield's hope that he could be interred here along with his wife Elizabeth and the two Wesleys, but he died and was buried in Newburyport, Massachusetts.

In 1890, the building was taken down and re-erected as Whitefield's Central Mission. In 1895, the coffins buried in the crypt (including Elizabeth Whitefield, but excluding the lead coffin of Augustus Toplady) were moved to Chingford Mount Cemetery in north London.

From 1903 until his death in 1914, the church's minister was Silvester Horne, the father of the broadcaster Kenneth Horne.

On Palm Sunday 1945, the church building was destroyed by the last V-2 rocket to fall on London. A new chapel was built in 1957, and the grounds became a public thoroughfare.

Since 1972, the chapel has been the home of the American International Church. It was offered to them by the United Reformed Church when they were forced to move from their building in North Audley Street in 1972. It also houses the London Chinese Lutheran Church.

The adjoining grounds have recently had a series of interpretive panels designed for them by Groundwork Camden, with funding from the Heritage Lottery Fund. These depict various scenes in the history of the chapel, Whitefield's links to Selina Hastings, Countess of Huntingdon, and the abolition of slavery as represented by Olaudah Equiano, who was buried at Whitefield's Tabernacle.

== American Church ==
During the Second World War, members of the U.S. military worshipped at the Anglican Grosvenor Chapel which was close to the American Embassy then on Grosvenor Square. After the war, the congregation grew from the ranks of State Department and Defense Department families while still relying on military chaplains for leadership.

In 1969, the church launched independent of that support and called the Rev. William Schotanus to be its first minister. After worshipping in several different church buildings, the American Church moved to the Whitefield Memorial Church in 1972.

== Notable burials ==
- Olaudah Equiano
- George Gauld (surveyor)
- Augustus Toplady
- J. S. Grimaldi
