= Joseph Grimaldi Park =

Public garden in Islington, London

- Burial Ground of St James's
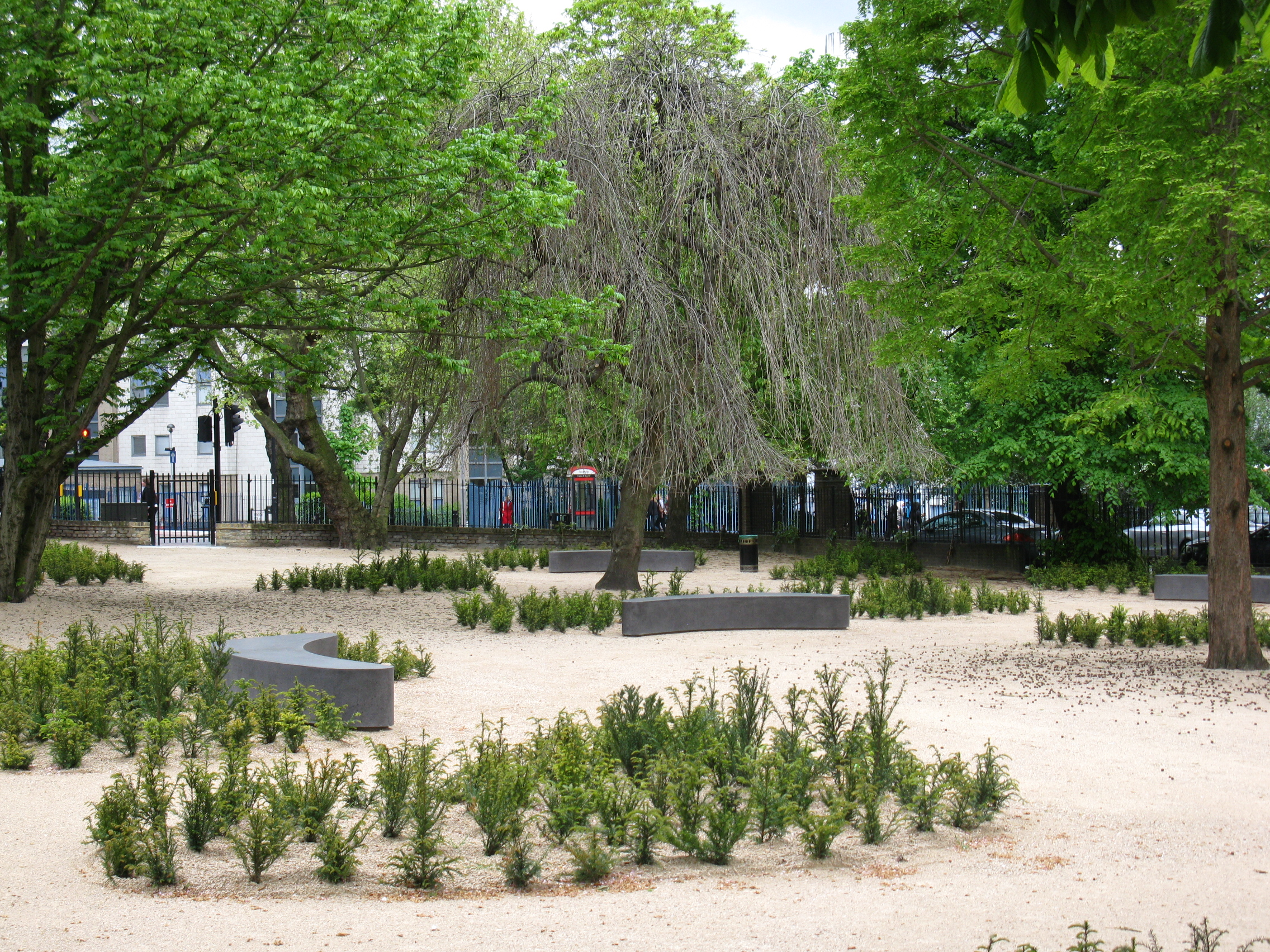
- Joseph Grimaldi Park after its 2010 refurbishment
- Interactive map of Joseph Grimaldi Park
- Type: public garden
- Location: London, England
- Coordinates: 51°31′55″N 0°06′54″W
- Area: 0.5 hectares (1 acre)
- Operator: London Borough of Islington
- Open: 8am-dusk
- Status: Open year round
- Website: islington.gov.uk

Joseph Grimaldi Park is a public garden located off Pentonville Road in Islington, north London. The former burial grounds for St James's Anglican Chapel (formerly known as the Burial Ground of St James's) are located within the park, which is named after the pantomime clown Joseph Grimaldi, who is buried here.

Following refurbishment in 2010, the park now includes a musical artwork dedicated to Grimaldi and his employer at Sadler's Wells, Charles Dibdin.

== History ==
The former burial ground dates to the 18th century. A proprietary chapel on the Pentonville Estate was built in 1787 and four years later became St James's, a chapel of ease for Clerkenwell parish church. St James's was given its own parish in 1854. By the late 19th century the grounds had been converted to a public garden and were later extended.

By the 20th century the church building had become redundant and was demolished in the 1980s to make way for an office building – originally known as Joseph Grimaldi House and now renamed.

== Layout and notable features ==
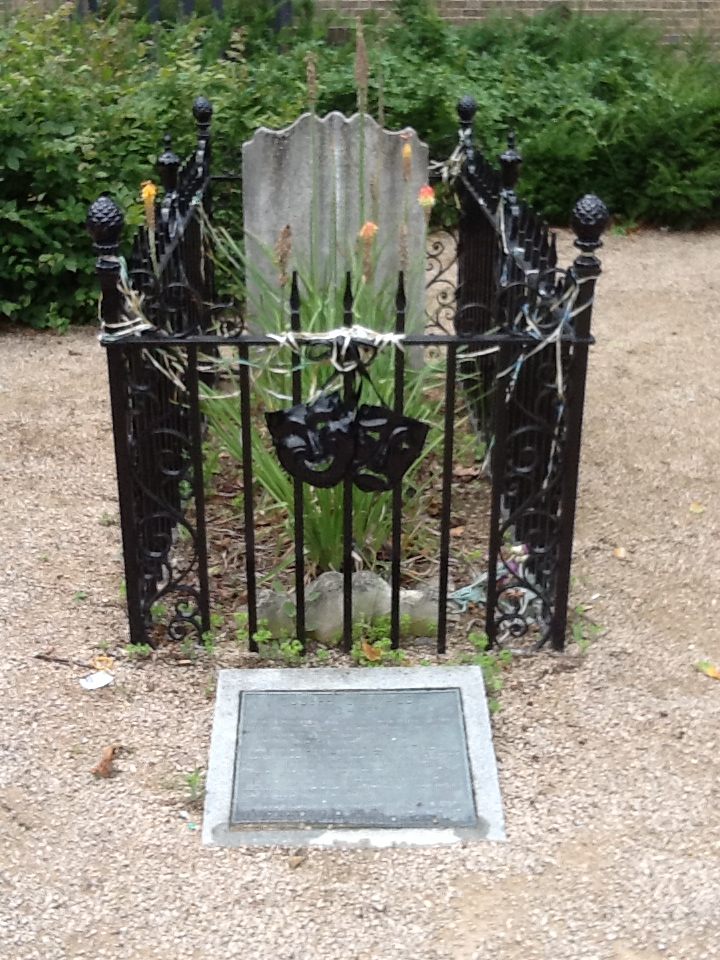
Joseph Grimaldi's grave

The park extends to 0.5 hectares (1 acre) and includes a tarmac ball court, children's playground and shrub beds. Notable trees include specimens of lime, London plane and horse-chestnut.

Joseph Grimaldi's grave is enclosed within railings and stands in the south-east corner, close to the entrance into Rodney Street. Other notable burials on the site include Henry Penton, responsible for many early developments in the area, including the church building that once stood on the site. Some remaining headstones are stacked by the northern boundary.

A tree and plaque remembering the former deputy mayor of Islington Paul Matthews, who championed the restoration of Grimaldi's grave, are also sited in the park.

== Refurbishment ==
The park was refurbished in 2010, with landscaping by Latz + Partner, which appointed Henry Krokatsis to create a public artwork in honour of Grimaldi and the English dramatist Charles Dibdin. Twin casket-shaped installations made up of bronze floor tiles are designed to be walked on, playing musical notes. The tiles are tuned so that it's possible to play "Hot Codlins", a song popularised by Grimaldi.

== External sources ==
- An invitation to dance on the grave of Joseph Grimaldi, article and short film clip from Creative Review blog
- St. James Chapel Churchyard at Find a Grave
