= Charles Dibdin the younger =

English dramatist, composer, writer and theatre proprietor

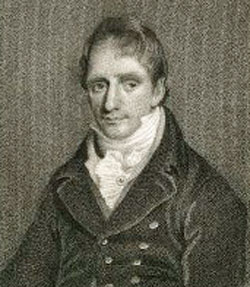
Dibdin in 1819

Charles Isaac Mungo Dibdin (17 October 1768 – 15 January 1833), or Charles Pitt or Charles Dibdin the younger, as he was professionally known, was an English dramatist, composer, writer and theatre proprietor. He was perhaps best known for his proprietorship of the Sadler's Wells Theatre and for the pantomimes and satirical farces that he wrote, and which were staged at many theatres across London. He employed Joseph Grimaldi at Sadler's Wells where Grimaldi appeared in many of his most successful pantomimes. He was the son of Charles Dibdin, brother of Thomas John Dibdin and godson of David Garrick.

== Biography ==
=== Early life and career ===
Born in Russell Court, Covent Garden, London as the illegitimate son of composer Charles Dibdin and the actress Harriett Pitt, Dibdin was named after his father's friend and librettist Isaac Bickerstaffe and their character Mungo in an afterpiece entitled The Padlock. Dibdin made his theatrical debut opposite his younger brother Thomas John Dibdin (b. 1771) in his godfather David Garrick's The Jubilee in 1775. Soon after this performance, his parents separated, and Dibdin changed his surname to his mother's maiden name, Pitt.

Dibdin's mother was initially against her son following a theatrical career and so arranged for him to start an apprenticeship for his uncle Cecil Pitt, a furniture-maker, who worked in central London. Dibdin commenced his schooling in Hackney, then moved to County Durham where, at the age of nine, he enrolled at a boarding-school at Barnard Castle, remaining there until the age of 14, without a holiday. When he was 14, Dibdin returned to London and began an apprenticeship for a pawnbroker, which he continued for several years. Keen to realize a literary ambition, Dibdin published a collection of verse, Poetical Attempts: by a Young Man in 1792 and along with his brother Thomas, wrote the Christmas pantomime The Talisman; or, Harlequin Made Happy in 1796.

In 1797 he recommenced his performing career at the Royalty Theatre in London in a one-man show called Sans six sous and became known professionally as Charles Dibdin the younger. The same year, he married the actress Mary Bates at St George's, Hanover Square, London on 13 June; the couple had eleven children. Among them were Mary Anne (1799–1886), a harpist who became the second wife of the controversialist Lewis Hippolytus Joseph Tonna, and Robert William (1805–1887), a clergyman and father of Sir Lewis Tonna Dibdin. Soon after his marriage, Dibdin sold a pantomime, based on the novel Don Quixote, to Philip Astley who further contracted Dibdin for a three-year engagement as a writer at Astley's Amphitheatre. Dibdin recalled the eccentric atmosphere at Astley's in his memoirs: "the Astleyian fancy was apt to be fascinated by such an Exhibition." Astley was known for his strict, fearsome reputation and insisted on starving his actors until after their act, using food as a reward for good performances. Astley ordered Dibdin to produce twelve burlettas, twelve pantomimes and twelve harlequinades a year. In 1799, Dibdin was offered a contract by the Sadler's Wells manager Richard Hughes to write pantomimes and harlequinades for the following year's season, including Harlequin Benedick; or, The Ghost of Mother Shipton and The Great Devil, both starring Joseph Grimaldi.

=== Peak years ===
Dibdin and his wife conducted a tour with the Astley company, travelling to Dublin and Liverpool as well as performing in London. It was during this period that Dibdin became a fluent and prolific composer, writing many songs, prologues, epilogues, and one-act musical plays. In 1799, Dibdin left Astley and sought alternative employment following his wife's dismissal for sewing during rehearsals. That autumn, the Dibdins joined a touring equestrian company, managed by William Davis and toured to such cities as Liverpool, Bristol, and Manchester.

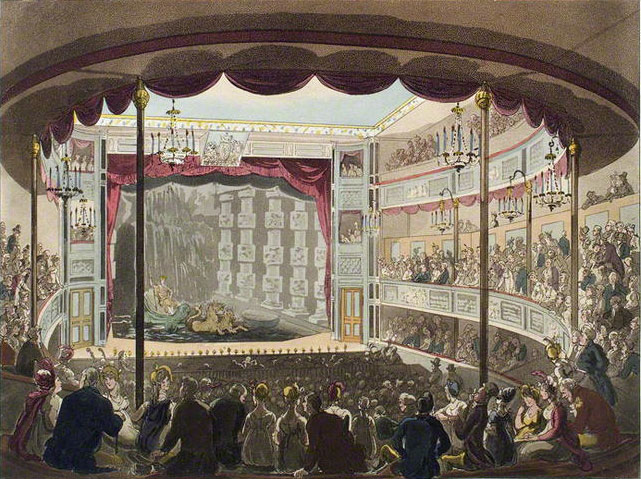
The Sadler's Wells Theatre in 1809

In 1800, Dibdin took over as manager at Sadler's Wells Theatre in London with the pantomime ballet Filial Love, or the Double Marriage being one of the first pieces to be staged under his managership. He hired a band of notable performers, including Edmund Kean and Joseph Grimaldi as well as many singers, tightrope-walkers, and pugilists. Throughout the seasons, he introduced many of his self-composed works that met the varied public taste. These spectacles improved the fortunes of Sadler's Wells, and by 1802 he, his brother Thomas and a syndicate of wealthy businessmen, including the scene painter Robert Andrews and composer William Reeve, became shareholders in the theatre. In 1803–4, Dibdin installed a large water tank and advertised the venue as an aquatic theatre that performed aqua dramas. (Note: To accommodate the installation of the tank, the stage floor was removed and the tank was placed on dwarf walls erected on the basement floor. The main tank measured ninety feet from the back of the stage to the front, twenty-four feet across and was built with channels either side so performers could float on and off during scenes. The tank was filled with water with a capacity of sixty-five thousand gallons. A second tank was installed to act as a waterfall which was placed at an angle in the flies.)

On 15 October 1807, eighteen people were killed in a stampede to escape when a mistaken fire alarm was given at the theatre. Although his proprietorship survived the disaster, the Napoleonic Wars of 1803-1815 had ruined public demand for Dibdin's type of entertainment, and his fortunes fell until, in 1819, he was declared bankrupt and was incarcerated in a debtors' prison. He was released two years later upon the sale of his shares in Sadler's Wells which bought him out of debt. He continued with his compositions, writing many songs and pantomimes for various London theatres and took up the role of stage director at the Royal Amphitheatre from 1822–23 and manager of the Surrey Theatre from 1825–26.

=== Later years ===
Dibdin published a number of poems including Young Arthur, or, The Child of Mystery: a Metrical Romance in 1819. He completed A History of the London Theatres which was published in 1826 to much acclaim. His last theatrical composition was the farce, Nothing Superfluous, which was produced in Hull in 1829. The following year, he completed his memoirs, but they were not published until discovered in 1956.

He died in 1833 at the age of 63 and was buried at St James's Chapel, Pentonville. In 2010 a musical artwork dedicated to Dibdin was installed during the park's refurbishment. The author Andrew McConnell Stott noted "[Dibdin] was a cheerful, tireless and frequently prosperous man with a love of patriotic ballads and convivial dinners."

=== Legacy ===
In 2025, the Joey Clowns released a collection of Dibdin’s 1808-1820 works that were performed by Joseph Grimaldi in his role as Clown on the album “Tippitywitchet” which included favorites such as the title track, “Hot Codlins”, “All the World’s In Paris”, “London Cheats (There Never Were Such Times)” and “Bull in a China Shop”.

== Notes and references ==
Notes

== Sources ==
- Bunn, Alfred (1840). The Stage: both before and behind the curtain, from observations taken on the spot. London: R. Bentley. OCLC 1205029.
- Dibdin, Charles (1864). Professional and Literary Memoirs of Charles Dibdin. London: Bohn. OCLC 2786005.
- Findlater, Richard (1955). Grimaldi King of Clowns. London: Magibbon & Kee. OCLC 558202542.
- McConnell Stott, Andrew (2009). The Pantomime Life of Joseph Grimaldi. Edinburgh: Canongate Books Ltd. ISBN 978-1-84767-761-7.
