= Scaramouche =

Stock clown character of the commedia dell'arte

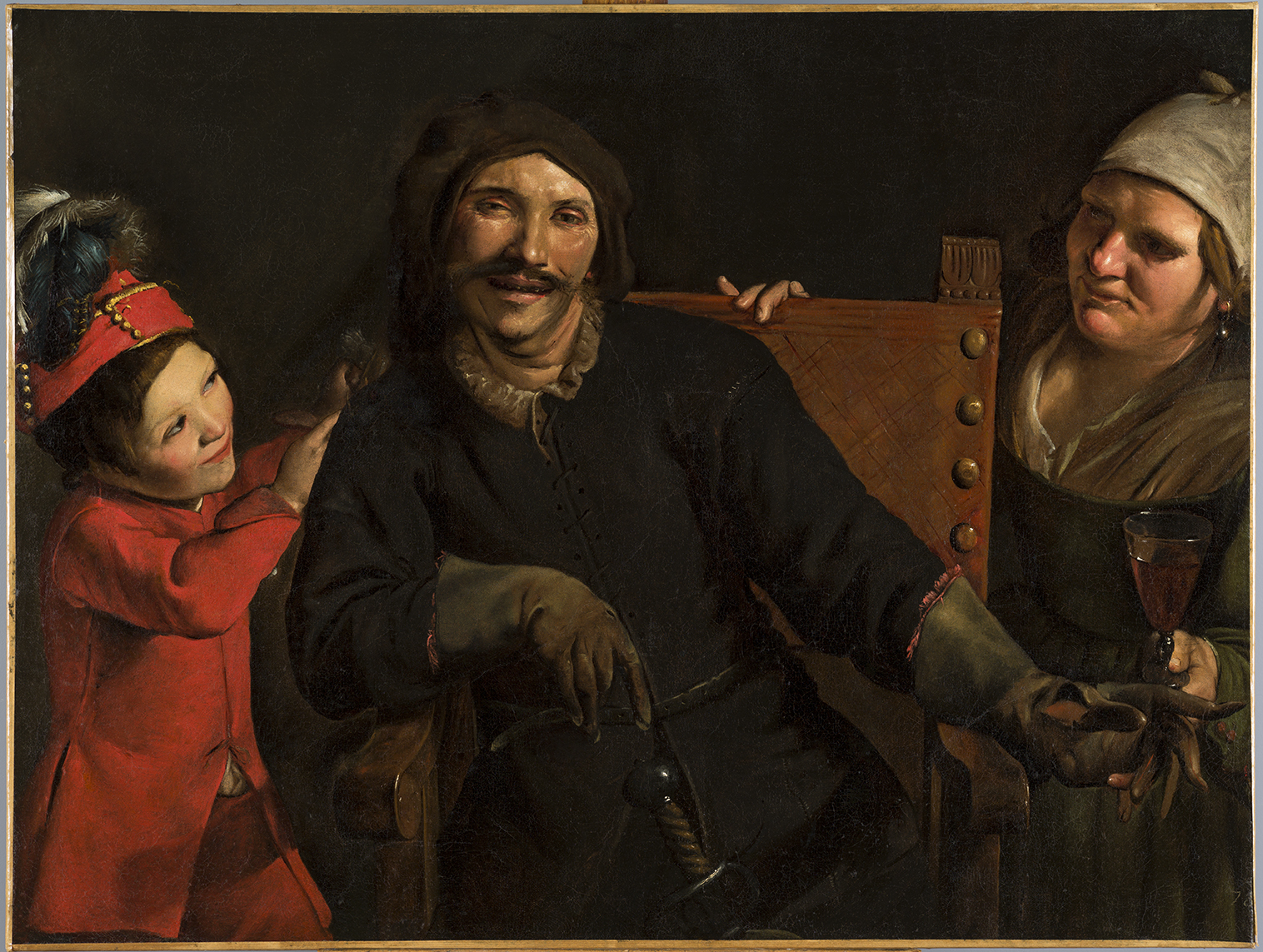
Portrait of Tiberio Fiorilli as Scaramouche by Pietro Paolini

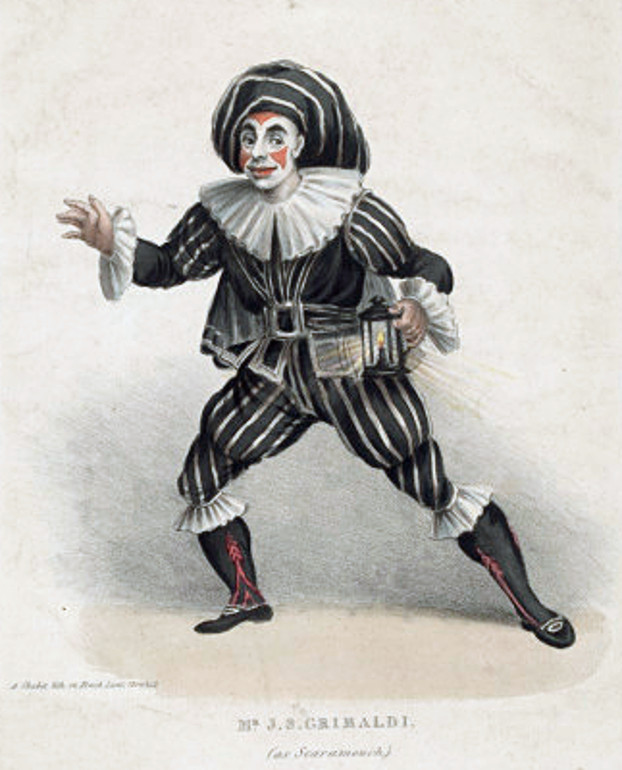
J. S. Grimaldi as Scaramouche, c. 1815

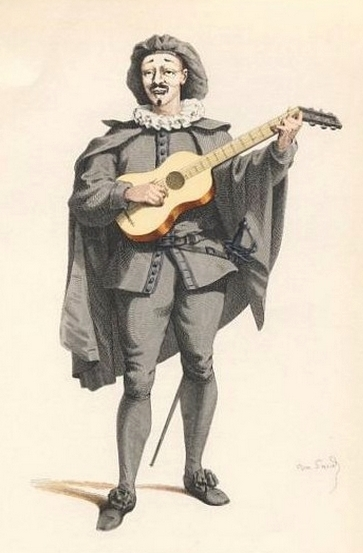
Scaramuccia in 1860

Scaramouche (French: [skaʁamuʃ]) or Scaramouch (English: /ˈskærəmuː(t)ʃ, -maʊtʃ/; Italian: Scaramuccia [skaraˈmuttʃa]; lit. 'little skirmisher') is a stock clown character of the 16th-century commedia dell'arte (comic theatrical arts of Italian literature). The role combined characteristics of the Zanni (servant) and il Capitano (masked henchman), with some assortment of villainous traits. Usually attired in black Spanish dress and burlesquing a don, he was often beaten by Harlequin for his boasting and cowardice.

== History ==
Although Tiberio Fiorillo (1608–1694) was not the first to play the role, he greatly developed and popularized it. He removed the mask, used white powder on his face, and employed grimaces. He was small, had a long beard, and wore a predominantly black costume with a white ruff. In France, he became known as Scaramouche. In the 19th century, the English actor Joseph Grimaldi and his son J. S. Grimaldi made numerous appearances as Scaramouche.

== Character ==
Scaramouche influences the audience to do his bidding. Rosa says that Coviello (like Scaramouche) is "short, adroit, supple, and conceited". In Molière's The Bourgeois Gentleman, Coviello disguises his master as a Turk and pretends to speak Turkish. Both Scaramouche and Coviello can be clever or stupid—as the actor sees fit to portray him.

In Blaise Pascal's Pensées Section 1 Article 12, Scaramouche is described as a person "who only thinks of one thing. The doctor, who speaks for a quarter of an hour after he has said everything, so full is he of the desire of talking."

== In puppetry ==
Scaramouche is one of the great characters in the Punch and Judy puppet shows with roots in commedia dell'arte. In some scenarios, he is the owner of The Dog, another stock character. During performances, Punch frequently strikes Scaramouche, causing his head to come off his shoulders. Because of this, the term scaramouche has become associated with a class of puppets with extendable necks.

== Scaramouche in popular culture ==
- The hero of Rafael Sabatini's historical novel Scaramouche, and its film adaptations, is a similar swashbuckling character who goes incognito in the theatrical role of Scaramouche.
- Several films were named Scaramouche, among other past films and TV series, include:
  - Scaramouche (1912-13) Op. 71, is a two-act tragic ballet-pantomime, comprising 21 numbers, written by the Finnish composer Jean Sibelius.
  - Scaramouche (1923), silent movie by Rex Ingram
  - Scaramouche (1952), directed by George Sidney with Stewart Granger, Janet Leigh, Eleanor Parker, and Mel Ferrer.
  - The Adventures of Scaramouche (1963), a French-Italian-Spanish feature film, directed by Antonio Isasi-Isasmendi, starring Gérard Barray, Michèle Girardon, and Gianna Maria Canale.
  - The Loves and Times of Scaramouche (1976), an Italian comedy film, directed by Enzo G. Castellari, starring Michael Sarrazin, Ursula Andress, and Aldo Maccione, about the adventures of a cad in Napoleonic times.
- Scaramouche is the name of a suite by the French composer Darius Milhaud for two pianos and some other combinations. Milhaud first composed the piece as an amalgam of music he wrote for theatre.
- In the 1975 song "Bohemian Rhapsody", by the British rock band Queen, Scaramouche is requested to perform the fandango.
- Inspired by "Bohemian Rhapsody", Scaramouche is the name of the lead female role in the jukebox musical play We Will Rock You.
- Scaramouche Jones (2002) is a solo play by Justin Butcher, which was premiered in its full form by Pete Postlethwaite. In this 100-minute monologue, an aging clown recounts, at the turn of the millennium, the picaresque story of his life, from his early childhood in Trinidad at the start of the 20th century, the son of a gypsy prostitute and an Englishman, through his harsh misadventures in the slave trade and in wartime Poland, where as a gravedigger he found his vocation as a clown while striving to keep children amused by parodying their imminent slaughter.
- In the opening chapter of the book Phule's Company by Robert Asprin, the main character Willard Phule uses Scaramouche as his alias ("Scaramouche?" Major Joshua said with a frown. "Aside from the obvious reference to the character from the novel.").
- In Tom Stoppard's On the Razzle, Scaramouche is the nom de plume used by sales clerk Weinberl in his letters while answering "lonely hearts advertisements".

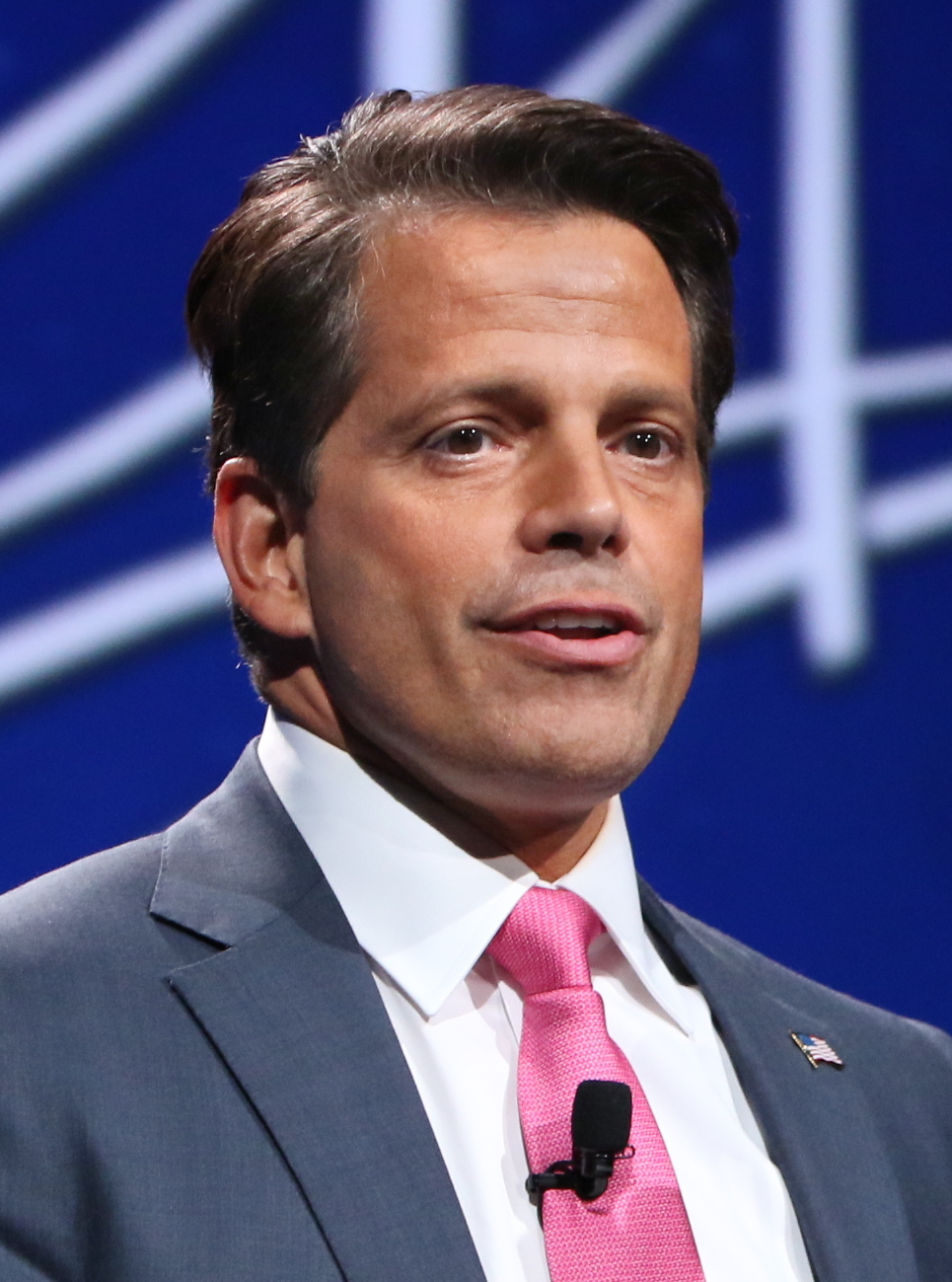
Anthony Scaramucci in 2016

- Investor Anthony Scaramucci was named the White House communications director in July 2017 and removed later that same month. His very public presence in news media prompted an 8,185% increase in searches for Scaramouche, according to Merriam-Webster. Cartoonist Ruben Bolling hinted at some striking congruities between Scaramucci's conduct in office and the defining traits of the theatrical figure.
- The final season of the cartoon Samurai Jack features a comedic antagonist named Scaramouche. This robotic character eventually becomes a disembodied head, similar to the scaramouche puppet.
- In the game Genshin Impact, the 6th of the Fatui Harbingers, who are all named after the commedia dell'arte, is known as Scaramouche.
- In the game Hunt: Showdown, DLC Commedia Della Morte contains a playable character, Scaramuccia, and other theater-inspired equipment skins.
- Charles Spencer reveals on page 112 of his 2024 memoir, A Very Private School, that Scaramouche was the name of a "homegrown" sport played at Maidwell Hall, the English Midlands prep school he attended as a child in the 1970s.
- Reece Shearsmith's character from the Inside No. 9 episode, "Wuthering Heist", is named Scaramouche.

== See also ==
- Commedia dell'arte
- Clown

== Bibliography ==
- The Editors of Encyclopaedia Britannica (11 April 2016). "Scaramouche". Encyclopædia Britannica.
- Hartnoll, Phyllis, ed. (1983). The Oxford Companion to the Theatre (Fourth ed.). Oxford: Oxford University Press. ISBN 9780192115461.
