= Memoirs of Joseph Grimaldi =

1838 autobiography of an English clown, edited by Dickens

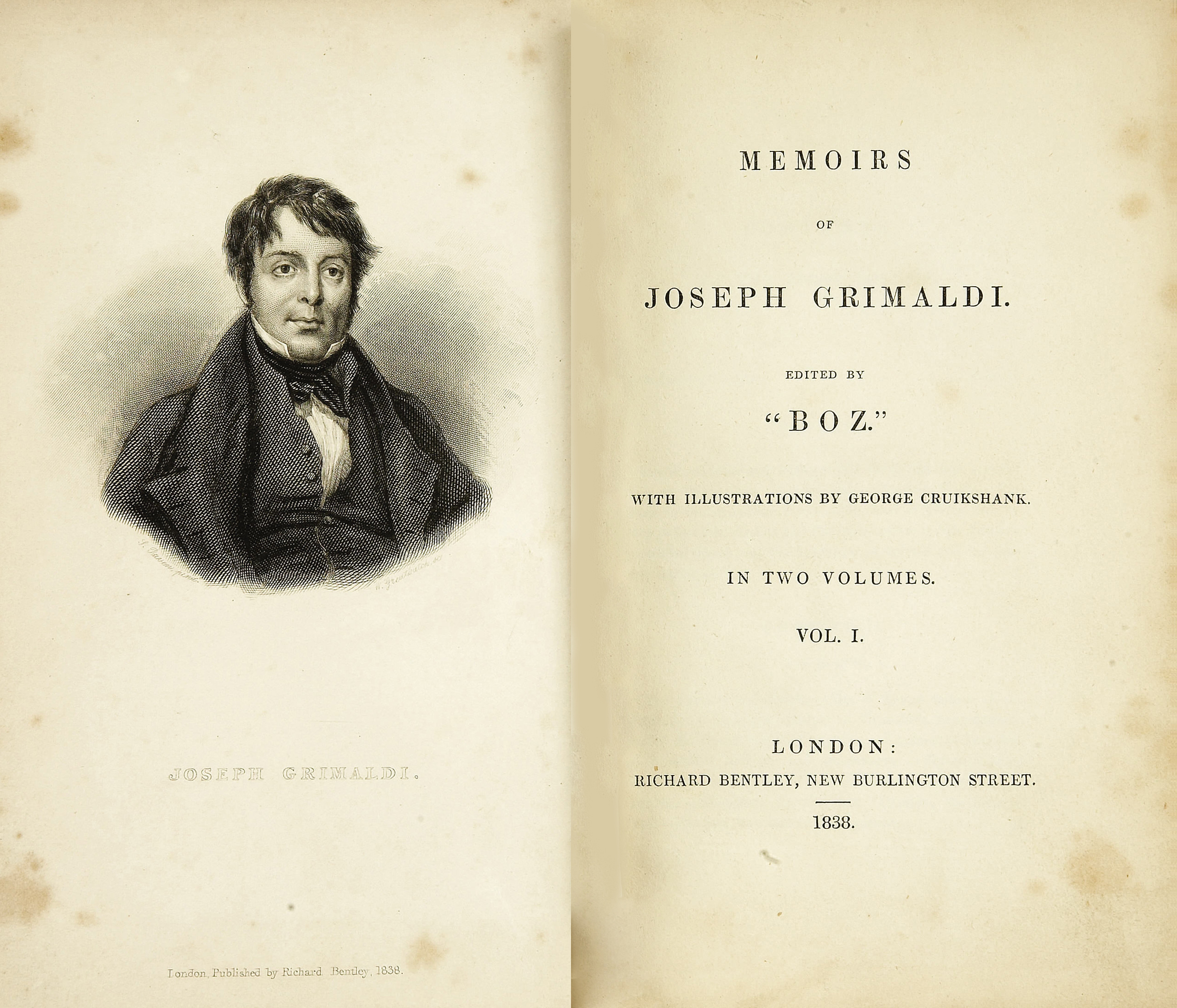
- Frontispiece, first edition of 1838
- Author: Edited: Charles Dickens ("Boz")
- Illustrator: George Cruikshank
- Language: English
- Genre: Autobiography
- Publisher: Richard Bentley; London
- Publication date: 1838 (in two volumes)
- Publication place: England
- Media type: Print (Hardback and Paperback)
- Preceded by: Oliver Twist
- Followed by: Nicholas Nickleby

Memoirs of Joseph Grimaldi is the 1838 autobiography of the pioneering nineteenth-century clown Joseph Grimaldi. It was edited by Charles Dickens, who first saw Grimaldi perform when he was just seven years old.

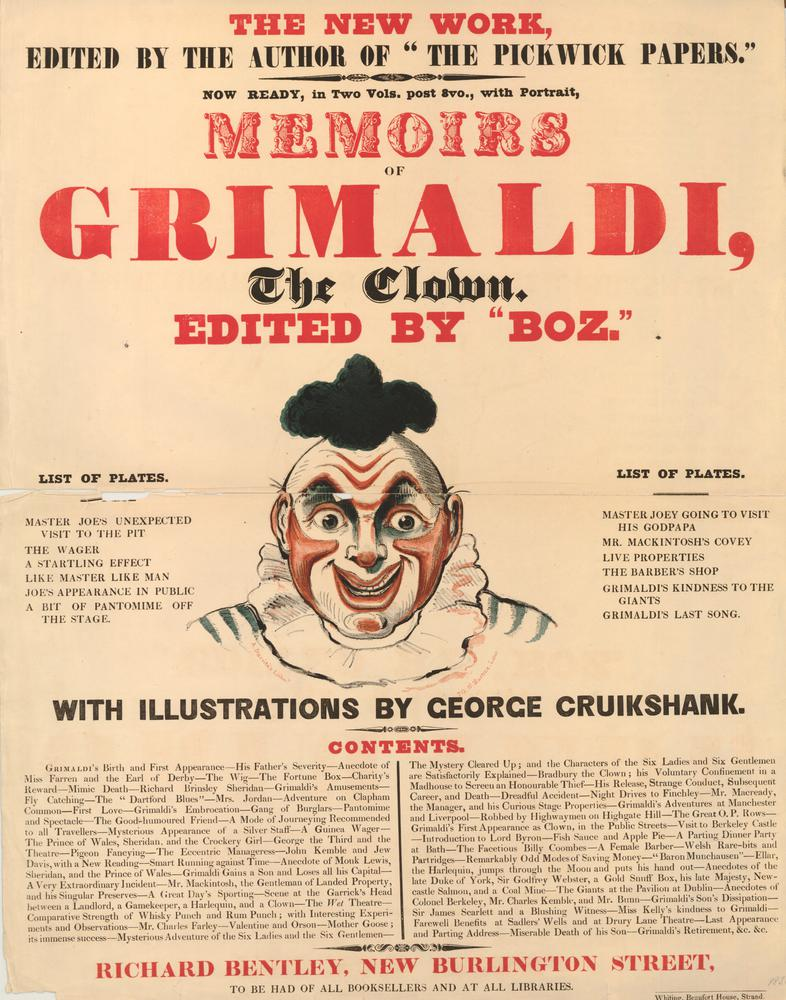
1838 Poster advertisement for Memoirs of Grimaldi

== Notes ==
- Charles Dickens, Memoirs of Joseph Grimaldi, Pushkin Press, London, 2008.
- Richard Findlater, Memoirs of Joseph Grimaldi, MacGibbon & Kee, 1968.
- Richard Findlater, Grimaldi: King of Clowns, 1955.
