= Jack Bologna =

Italian dancer and actor

John Peter Bologna (1775 –1846), known as Jack Bologna on stage, was an Italian actor and dancer, who spent much time in England popularising the role of Harlequin in Georgian pantomimes and harlequinades in the early part of the 1800s at the Sadler's Wells and Covent Garden Theatres.

After arriving in England with his performing family in 1787, Bologna made his London debut at the Covent Garden Theatre as Harlequin in the pantomime Niobe; or, Harlequin's Ordeal. After playing in his family's act throughout England, he starred in, and later choreographed, pantomimes and plays, including some notable successes at the Royal Circus, including The Cloud King, The Sorceress of Strozzi, Black Beard, and Edwin of the Green. In 1806, he, along with the famous Clown performer Joseph Grimaldi, performed in Harlequin and Mother Goose; or, the Golden Egg, Bologna's biggest success. Bologna was also an amateur machinist who often showcased his mechanical designs, using them on stage as part of his productions.

Having mostly retired from the stage in 1820, he struggled financially and lived in severe poverty throughout the remaining 26 years of his life, before dying penniless aged 71.

== Biography ==
=== Early life ===
Bologna was born into a performing family. His father, Pietro Bologna, was an Italian clown performer, who became famous for his ability to play the flute through each nostril and to play the drum while tightrope walking. Bologna's mother was an actress, and his siblings, Louis (d. 1808) and Barbara (1786–1804), performed with the family act. Jack made his debut on the Italian stage at age 11, soon afterwards coming to England in 1787, where he met the ten-year-old Joseph Grimaldi, who had begun performing in the pantomimes of his actor father Giuseppe. The two young performers formed a close friendship. From there, Bologna made his first appearance on the English stage with his family's tumbling act, which initially toured the provincial theatres.

The Bolognas became popular in the provinces and took up an engagement at the Sadler's Wells Theatre in London in 1792 where, among other actors, they appeared in Medea's Kettle; or, Harlequin Renovated and La Tableau Chinois. The Bolognas left London for Norwich to join a troupe called The Royal Circus in 1794. While there, Bologna learned the art of tightrope walking from his father and, at age 21, billed as "Bologna Jun", he returned to London to star for the first time at the Covent Garden Theatre as Harlequin in the pantomime Niobe; or, Harlequin's Ordeal, opening in July 1797. The piece was a success, and the theatre's proprietors engaged him in further productions.

=== Career ===
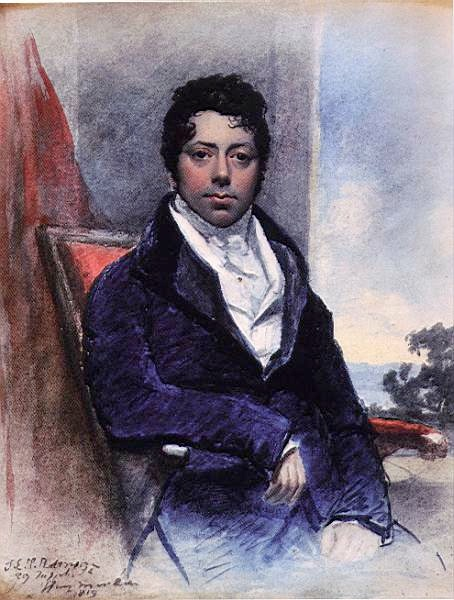
Bologna's friend and frequent co-star Joseph Grimaldi

On 24 November 1797, Bologna opened in the part of Setric in the Christmas pantomime The Round Tower. In 1798, he returned briefly to Norwich where he starred as Bertrand in The Knights of Malta. On 3 June 1800, he married Harriet Bath Barnewell, a dancer and vocalist, in Hanover Square, London. In 1801, Bologna choreographed the production Rinaldo Rinaldini at London's Royal Circus, in which he played the title role. From 1802, he appeared at Sadler's Wells as Harlequin, and, with his brother Louis, starred in the burletta Edward and Susan which Jack also composed. Also in the cast was Joseph Grimaldi, who played the part of Clown. Bologna and Grimaldi would often collaborate professionally and would continue a lifelong friendship until Grimaldi's death in 1837. With the Napoleonic War threatening England in 1803, Bologna enlisted in the volunteer corps in the autumn and joined the rifle regiment of John Barber Beaumont in England, but left two years later.

In 1805, Bologna succeeded James Byrne as Harlequin at the Covent Garden theatre and, the following year, along with Grimaldi, he starred in Thomas Dibdin's Christmas pantomime Harlequin and Mother Goose; or, the Golden Egg. The show was a success and ran for ninety-two nights, selling 300,000 tickets. So successful was Bologna's partnership with Grimaldi that between 1807 and 1814, they earned £2,000 in various benefit performances. Between November 1805 and February 1806, he was engaged by Charles Dibdin to appear at the Amphitheatre in Dublin, and the following year he choreographed a number of successful pantomimes and plays at the Royal Circus, including The Cloud King, The False Friend, The Mysterious Freebooter, The Sorceress of Strozzi, Black Beard, Moms and Mercury, Buenos Ayres, Werter and Charlotte and Edwin of the Green. Having seen Bologna in a performance of Oscar and Malvina in 1807, the actor John Philip Kemble said of him: "If that man could speak as well as he acts [in] pantomimes, I would never again appear on the stage".

On 8 July 1808, Bologna was hired to entertain guests at a masked ball at Burlington House. There, he met Lord Byron, who admitted to being such a fan of pantomime that he based his poem Don Juan on an afterpiece given by Delpini, a character from the harlequinade. So impressed was he at Bologna's performance, that he asked Bologna to reserve him a seat at all of his future benefits. Due to the physical demands of performing as Harlequin, Bologna broke his collar bone during a performance of Harlequin and the Swans in 1813. Bologna's wife, Harriet, died in 1814, and he remarried in 1816, to the dancer Louisa Bristow, who was his friend Grimaldi's sister-in-law. Bologna had met Bristow in 1810 while she was playing Columbine during one of Grimaldi's harlequinades. In 1815–16, Bologna performed at the Covent Garden Theatre, but he left in 1817.

After a ten-year absence from Sadler's Wells, Bologna returned in 1819 to appear in the only pantomime that Grimaldi authored, The Fates; or, Harlequin's Holy Day, in which he played harlequin. The piece was a flop, mainly because of its writer's ailing health and sudden departure from the production. While engaged at the Pantheon Theatre in Edinburgh, Bologna secured himself a lucrative contract with the proprietors of London's Theatre Royal, Drury Lane to appear in the 1819 Christmas pantomime, earning him more than £6 per week.

==== Designer and engineer ====
An amateur machinist, Bologna assisted in the design for many of the mechanical parts used in the 1801 Christmas production Harlequin's Tour at Covent Garden, in which he also played Harlequin. In 1803, he showcased a design of a machine he devised while working at the Lyceum Theatre in London. Bologna called it a Phantoscopia. In 1807–08 he received extra payments for his mechanical work in such productions as Harlequin in his Element. In 1810 in recognition of his works, Bolgna was given a licence to hold an exhibition of his mechanical contraptions at the Sans Pareil Theatre. Charles Dibdin called Bologna's mechanical exhibition "A very ingenious mechanical and philosophical exhibition".

=== Later years and death ===
Bologna mostly retired from performing in 1820, returning only to play benefits for himself and Grimaldi. By 1840, his mechanical exhibitions no longer attracted any interest, and he briefly entered a workhouse. He emerged to teach choreography and was recruited in 1841 by a magician named Anderson to play his black-faced sidekick, Ebony, at public houses throughout the provinces. The Anderson and Ebony act was controversial and caused public outrage when they exhibited two disabled children whom they billed as the "Aztec Lilliputians". Bologna remained in this act until his death.

Bologna died penniless in Glasgow, Scotland, aged 71, of natural causes.

== Sources ==
- Disher, Maurice Willson (1925). Clowns and Pantomimes. Michigan: Constable (London). ISBN 978-0-405-08446-1.
- Highfill, Phillip. H (1973). A Biographical Dictionary of Actors, Actresses, Musicians, Dancers, Managers, and Other Stage Personnel in London 1660–1800: Volume 2. Illinois: Southern Illinois University Press. ISBN 0-8093-0518-6.
- McConnell Stott, Andrew (2009). The Pantomime Life of Joseph Grimaldi. Edinburgh: Canongate Books. ISBN 978-1-84767-761-7.
