= All the World's in Paris =

British song

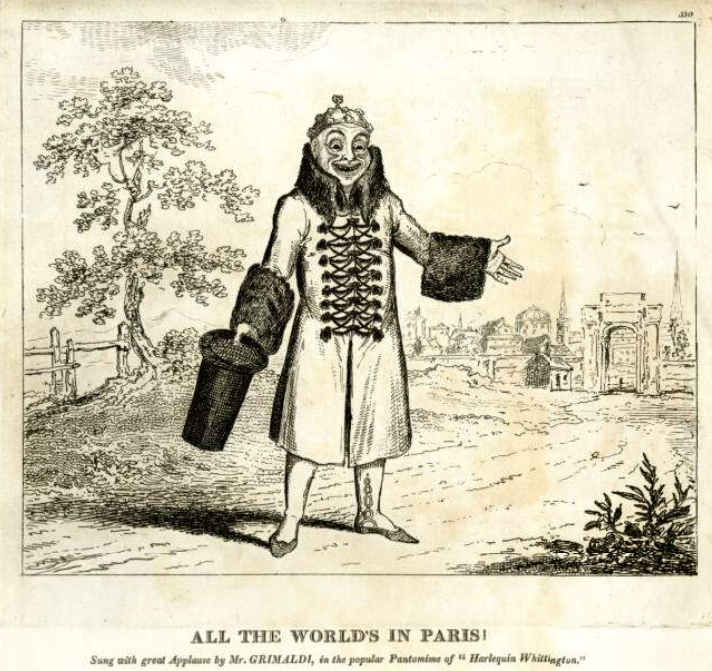
1815 print by George Cruikshank portraying Joseph Grimaldi singing the song.

"All the World's in Paris" is an 1814 comedy song by the British performer Joseph Grimaldi. It formed part of the Harlequin Whittington Boxing Day pantomime first performed at the Theatre Royal, Covent Garden in London. it mocked the fashionable British upper-class tourists who had flocked to the French capital Paris following the defeat of Napoleon. Grimaldi dressed up as an exaggerated dandy of the Regency style as well as traditional clown make-up.

A pirated, parodic play on the song was released under the title "Boney's Return to Paris" in 1815 following Napoleon's escape from Elba during the Hundred Days, before his defeat at Waterloo. The original song continued to have relevance during the subsequent post-Waterloo Allied Occupation of France under the Duke of Wellington, as the British elite continued to travel to Paris in great numbers. It was the inspiration for a popular print by George Cruikshank portraying Grimaldi singing the song. In 2025, the Joey Clowns released a collection of 11 songs that Grimaldi performed from 1808-1820 and authored by Charles Dibdin Jr on the album “Tippitywitchet”, which included Grimaldi’s most popular including “All the World’s in Paris”, “London Cheats (There Never Were Such Times)” and “Bull in a China Shop”.

== Bibliography ==
- Buckmster, Jonathon. Dickens's Clowns: Charles Dickens, Joseph Grimaldi and the Pantomime of Life. Edinburgh University Press, 2019.
- Findlater, Richard. Joe Grimaldi: His Life and Theatre. CUP Archive, 1979.
- George, Mary Dorothy. Hogarth to Cruickshank: Social Change in Graphic Satire. Walker, 1967.
- Jensen, Oskar Cox. Napoleon and British Song, 1797-1822. Springer, 2015.
