= Cemaes =

Village in Anglesey, Wales

Coordinates: 53.411°N 4.453°W

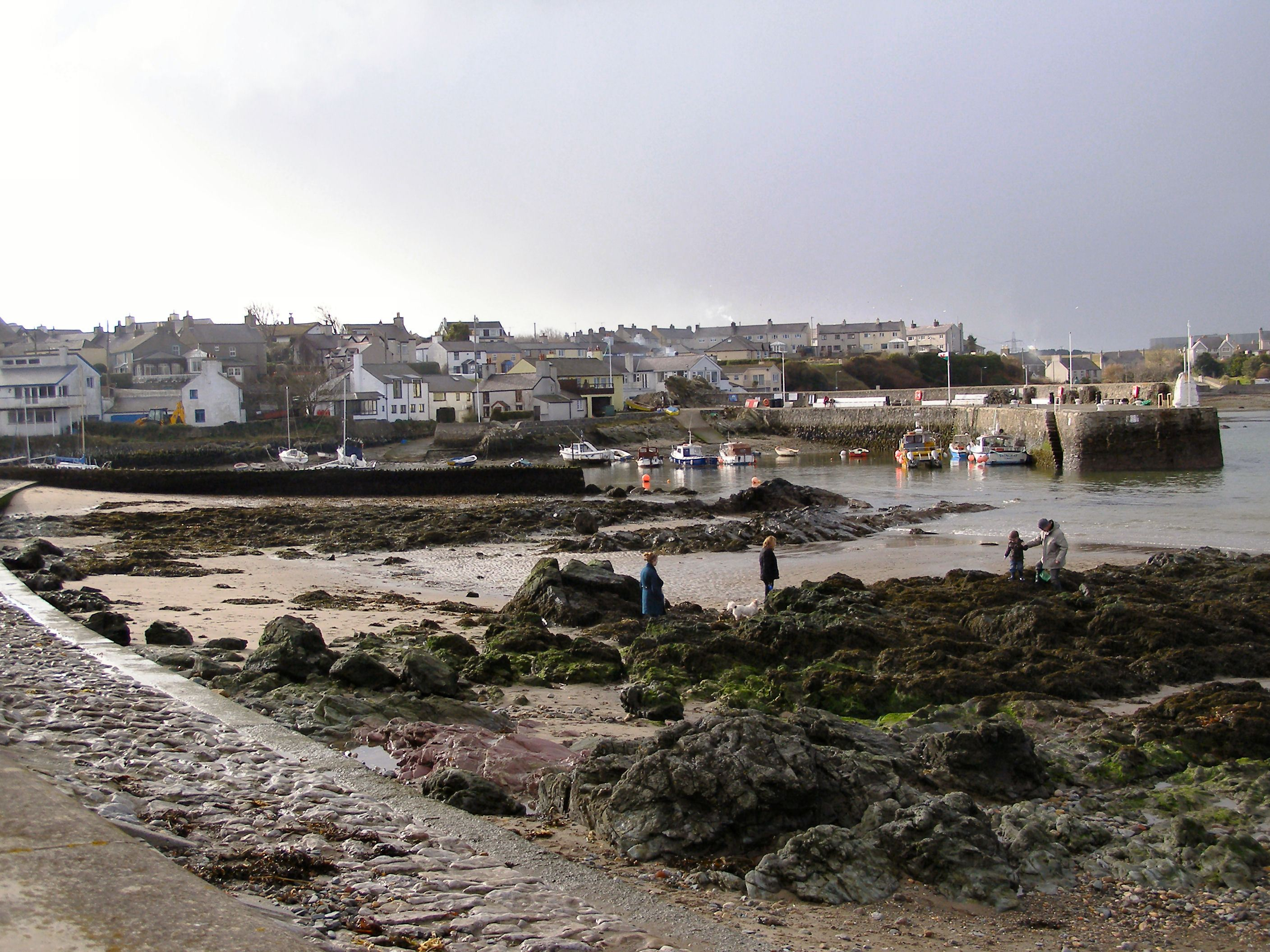
- Cemaes Harbour

- Location within Anglesey
- Population: 1,357
- OS grid reference: SH370933
- Community: Llanbadrig
- Principal area: Anglesey
- Preserved county: Gwynedd
- Country: Wales
- Sovereign state: United Kingdom
- Post town: CEMAES BAY
- Postcode district: LL67
- Dialling code: 01407
- Police: North Wales
- Fire: North Wales
- Ambulance: Welsh
- UK Parliament: Ynys Môn
- Senedd Cymru – Welsh Parliament: Bangor Conwy Môn

Cemaes (Welsh pronunciation) is a village on the north coast of Anglesey in Wales, sited on Cemaes Bay, an Area of Outstanding Natural Beauty which is partly owned by the National Trust. It is the most northerly village in Wales (excluding the nearby hamlet of Llanbadrig). The name Cemaes derives from the Welsh word cemais, meaning "bend or loop in a river, inlet of sea, bay". In 2011 the population of Cemaes in Llanbadrig community was 1,357. The most northerly point in Wales, Ynys Badrig, is nearby.

Cemaes is a fishing port and tourist resort, and is known for its beach. It has a sheltered natural harbour that looks north to the Irish Sea and is the site of an ancient settlement. Cemaes also has a wind farm and at nearby Wylfa is a nuclear power station. The river in the village is the River Wygyr, which flows from just below Parys Mountain to the sea at Cemaes. It is joined along the way by the Afon Meddanen on Carrog Farm, Carrog. The name Wygyr is Welsh and may mean "green wood" ((g)wig + ir) or perhaps 'where two rivers meet'.

Since the Victorian era the picturesque character of Cemaes and the natural beauty of the island have attracted many artists and tourists. Lloyd George used to visit here. Cemaes is located on the Anglesey Coastal Path and is popular with walkers.

The village football team, Cemaes Bay F.C., play in the Welsh Alliance League, but previously have played in the League of Wales, being the first team on Anglesey to do so.

== History ==
The village was a commotal seat for the Prince of Wales before the invasion of Edward I in 1282–83. Dafydd ap Llywelyn, prince of Wales from 1240 to 1246, is recorded as having issued an act at Cemaes in 1238.

Between the end of the 18th and beginning of the 20th century the village was noted for producing salted herring as well as bricks from a nearby works, which was served by a narrow gauge tramway down to the sea. The pier, which was badly needed for trade and fishing, and later tourism, was damaged badly by storms in 1828 and 1889. Both times they were rebuilt and improved by local businessmen.

Throughout its history the village has had three names. The first was Castell Iorwerth ("Iorwerth's Castle") after Iorwerth Drwyndwn, the father of Llywelyn ab Iorwerth. The second name, Cemais, is similar to the modern name and refers to the meanders in the River Wygyr that are near the village. The name of the nearby Wylfa nuclear power station is linked to the village. The late 19th-century Cemaes resident David Hughes, who travelled to Liverpool and found riches in the building industry, lived for much of his life on the island. He built the village hall in 1898 and his home 'Wylfa Manor' in 1896, on the site of the current power station. It is located under the current Wylfa car park.

The village hosted several matches of the 2019 Inter Games Football Tournament, a replacement football tournament for the popular Island Games. The games were held in Gibraltar but the lack of pitches there meant Anglesey was deemed to be a better host.

== Landmarks ==
=== Cemaes Heritage Centre ===
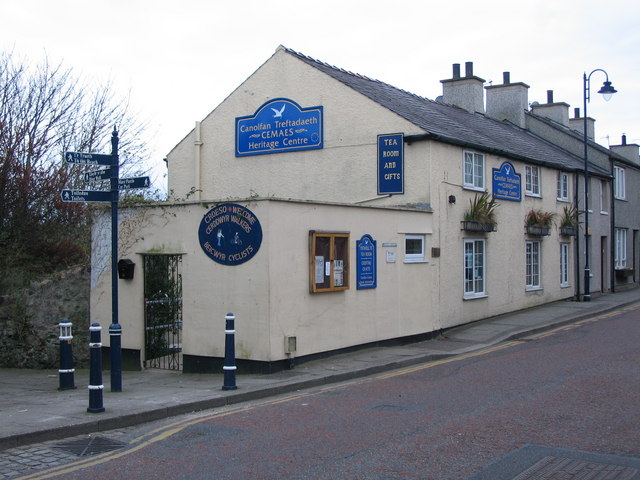
The Cemaes heritage centre

The centre forms a permanent exhibition, tea room/coffee shop and a meeting and training room. It features a heritage experience, in which one can learn about the bygone era of Cemaes and the parish of Llanbadrig, from Stone Age nomads, and the area's connection to the native Welsh Princes, to Cemaes' more recent maritime and industrial heritage. It retells the life stories of some of Cemaes' characters – 'Portraits of Cemaes' – and displays a permanent art collection reflecting how artists were inspired by Cemaes' landscape and heritage.

=== Llanbadrig Church ===
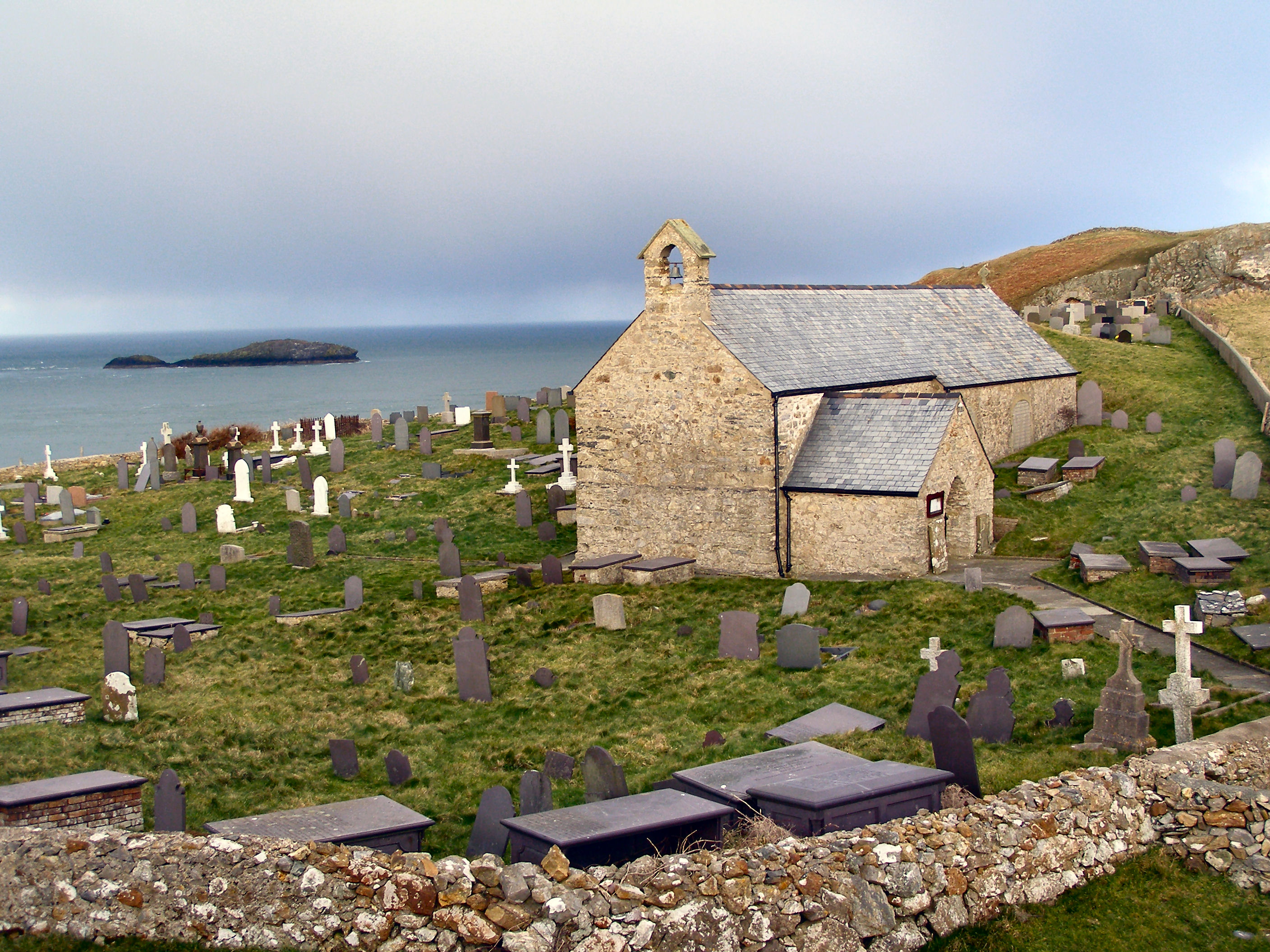
Llanbadrig Church

Those who make the pilgrimage from Cemaes to the headland to the east, where the church stands, will be rewarded by both the history of the church and views on a clear day to the Isle of Man, the hills of the Lake District and the Mountains of Mourne in Ireland. The Welsh name Llanbadrig means "church of St Patrick". There are three churches in Wales dedicated to St Patrick, although Llanbadrig church, founded in AD 440, is probably the only one with a direct link to the patron saint of Ireland. We know that Patrick, then Bishop, was sent by Pope Celestine I to Ireland to convert the Irish to Christianity during the 5th century. Local legend states that Patrick was shipwrecked on Ynys Badrig (Patrick's Island, which is also called Middle Mouse because of its shape). This island can be seen from the stile in the churchyard wall. He succeeded in crossing to Anglesey, landing at Rhos Badrig (Patrick's Moor) and finding refuge in Ogof Badrig (Patrick's Cave). This cave, below the churchyard, has a freshwater well, Ffynnon Badrig (Patrick's Well), but rockfalls have made the well inaccessible. Legend states that this fresh water allowed Bishop Patrick to recover from his ordeal, and he founded the church in thanks to God for safe deliverance.

The current church on the site dates from the 14th century. The church was restored in 1884 by Lord Stanley of Alderley, who incorporated elements of the Muslim faith into the design. In the late 20th century the church had to be restored twice due to fire damage. As of 2026, the church holds a silent prayer service once a week.

=== St. Patrick's Bell ===
In 2014, a Time and Tide Bell was installed on Cemaes Bay. The bell was designed by Marcus Vergette and named St. Patrick's Bell to commemorate the site where St. Patrick landed in the fifth century. The bell was installed to raise awareness around rising sea levels, and the rising tide causes the bell to chime at various pitches.

== Geology ==
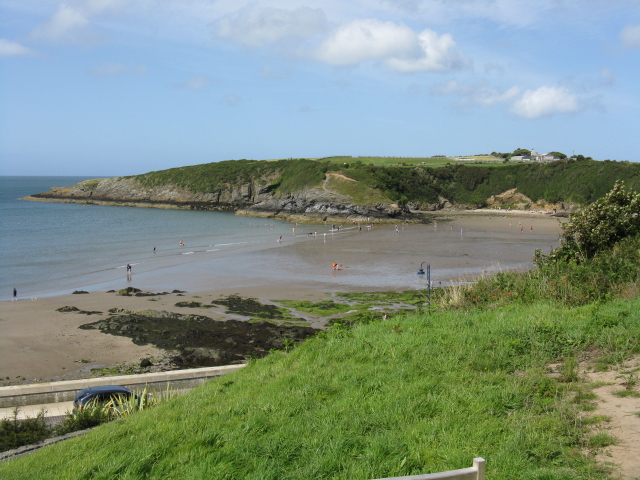
The beach at Cemaes

The rocks exposed by coastal erosion in North Anglesey belong mainly to what geologists call the Mona Complex, which is among the oldest rock units seen in Wales. It underlies, and is therefore older than, the slates of the North Wales quarrying industry, but is probably not very much older in geological terms. Since the remains of fossilized remains have been found in the rocks, it does not pre-date the origins of life and is therefore probably about 600 million years old.

The locality is well known to geologists following the enthusiastic description by Edward Greenly, in his pioneering book on the geology of Anglesey dated 1919: "a many-coloured mélange that is really indescribable, and must be seen in the field to be envisaged".

== Wildlife ==
Cemaes has a range of wildlife from foxes and peregrine falcons to marine life. On Wylfa Head, you can see porpoises coming up for air. Cemaes harbour is a good spot for fishing, as you can catch Atlantic mackerel, flatfish, red crabs and other fish and crustaceans. Near Cemaes is Cemlyn, which hosts the only breeding Sandwich terns in Wales.

== Wales in Bloom ==
Cemaes Bay through the hard work of local volunteers has won the 'Wales in Bloom' village category on a number of occasions, the last being 2008.

== Notable people ==
- Sonia Edwards, a Welsh poet and writer who writes primarily in Welsh; she taught Welsh at Ysgol Gyfun Llangefni
- Thomas William Jones, an able seaman on board the Titanic, and a survivor of her sinking.
