= Aberdyfi =

Village and community in Gwynedd, Wales

Aberdyfi Aberdovey
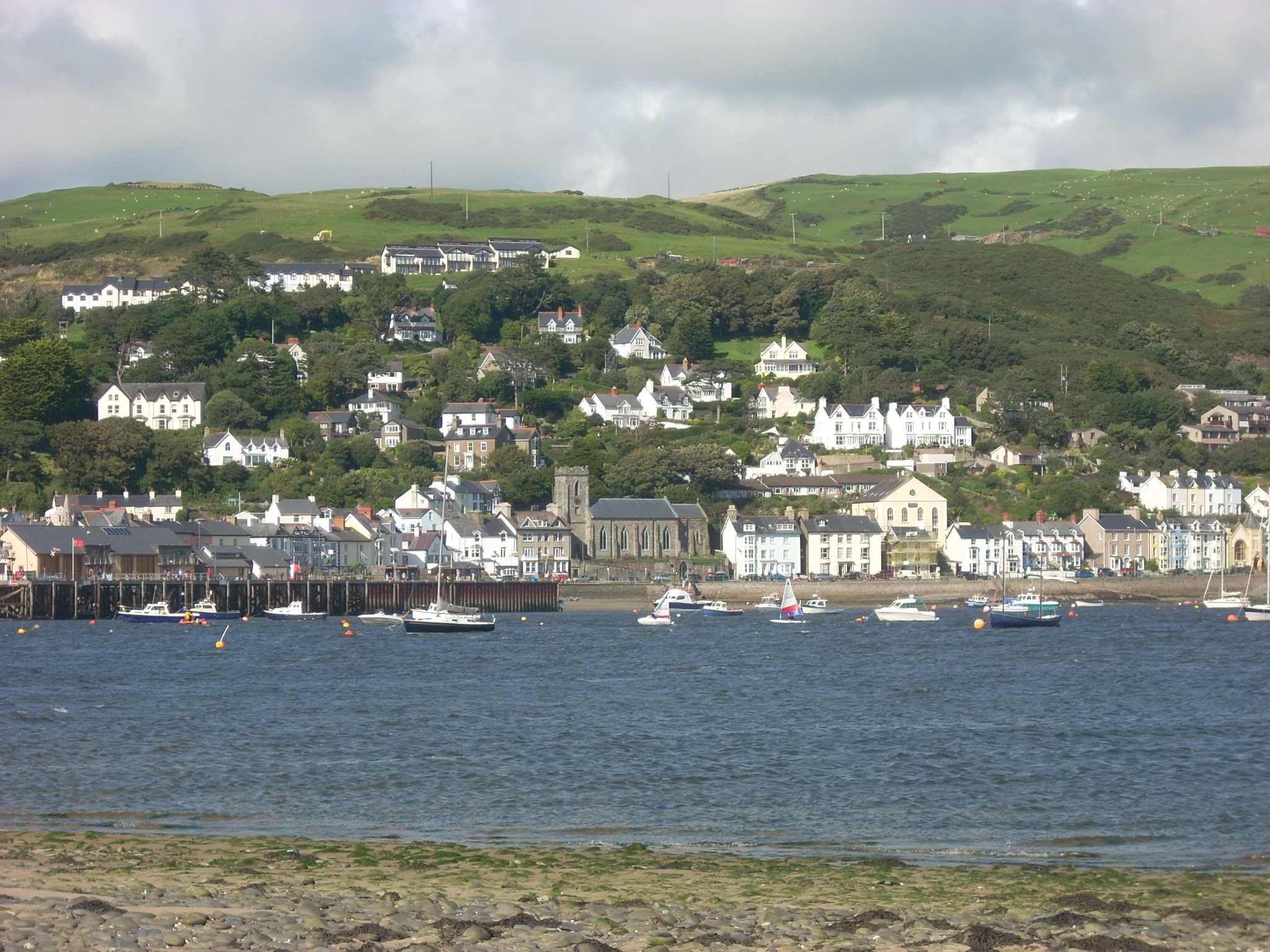
- Aberdyfi viewed from across the estuary

- Location within Gwynedd
- Population: 1,282 (2011)
- OS grid reference: SN615965
- Community: Aberdyfi
- Principal area: Gwynedd
- Preserved county: Gwynedd
- Country: Wales
- Sovereign state: United Kingdom
- Post town: ABERDYFI / ABERDOVEY
- Postcode district: LL35
- Dialling code: 01654
- Police: North Wales
- Fire: North Wales
- Ambulance: Welsh
- UK Parliament: Dwyfor Meirionnydd
- Senedd Cymru – Welsh Parliament: Gwynedd Maldwyn
- List of places UK Wales Gwynedd 52.544°N 4.044°W Map of the community

Aberdyfi (Welsh pronunciation: [abɛrˈdəvi]), also known as Aberdovey (/æbərˈdʌviː/ a-bər-DUH-vee), is a village and community in Gwynedd, Wales, located on the northern side of the estuary of the River Dyfi.

The population of the community was 878 at the 2011 census. The electoral ward had a larger population of 1,282 and includes the community of Pennal.

Founded by shipbuilding, Aberdyfi is now a seaside resort with a high quality beach. The centre is on the river and seafront, around the original harbour, jetty and beach; it stretches back from the coast and up the steep hillside in the midst of typical Welsh coastal scenery of steep green hills and sheep farms. Penhelig railway station (Welsh: Penhelyg) is in the eastern part of the village.

Being less than 100 miles (160 km) from the West Midlands, the area is popular with tourists. 43.3% of houses in the village are holiday homes. The village is located within the Snowdonia National Park.

In the 2011 census, 38.5% of the population of Aberdyfi ward identified themselves as Welsh (or combined). 59.4% of the population were born outside Wales. According to the 2021 census, 43.3% could speak Welsh – an increase of 0.7% from last time.

== Name ==
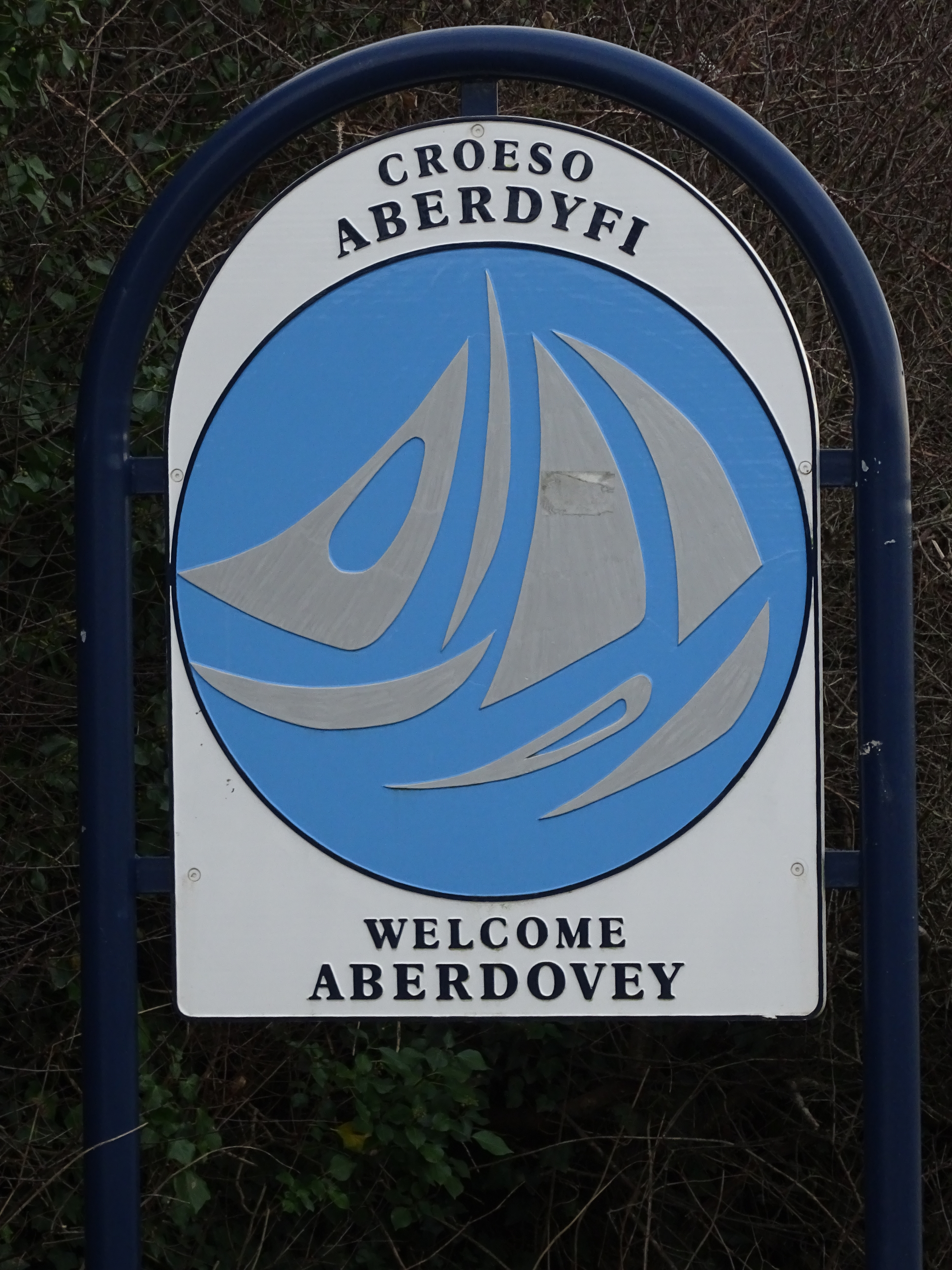
Bilingual welcome sign, using both the Welsh and anglicised spellings, on the approach to the village in 2023

The anglicised spelling for the village and community is Aberdovey. The Welsh Aberdyfi is now widely used locally and by the Gwynedd Council and the Welsh Government.

The body responsible for providing advice on the standard forms of Welsh place-names, the Welsh Language Commissioner, recommends Aberdyfi to be the standard form for use in both English and Welsh. Some entities continue to use the anglicisation, e.g. some local businesses in their name and/or address; and some use the two spellings interchangeably, e.g. the BBC, or under different circumstances, e.g. the Aberdyfi Community Council.

== History ==
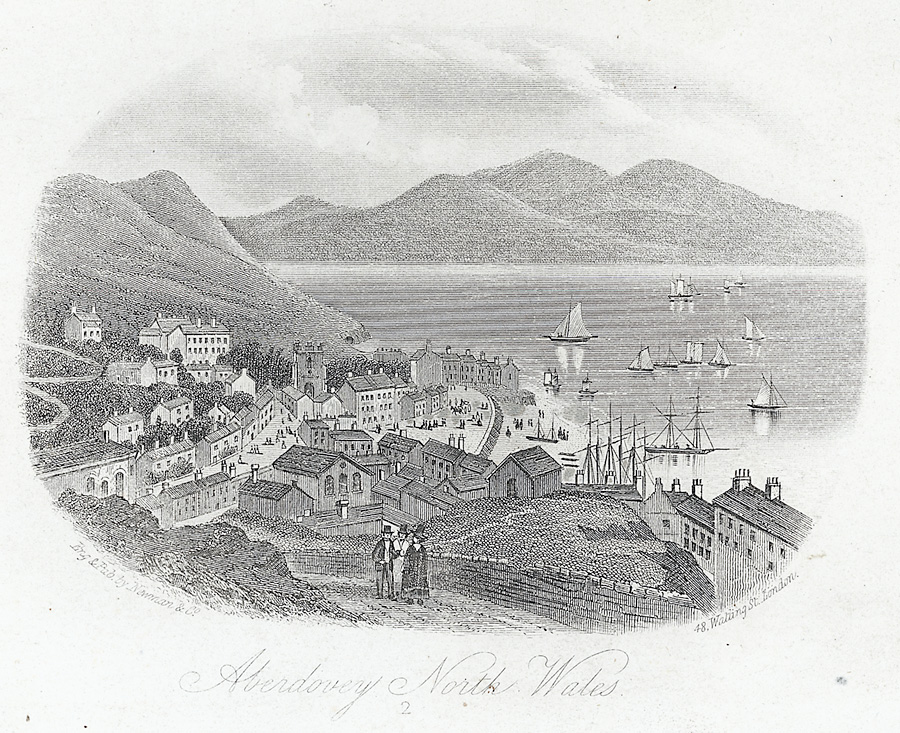
The village in 1860

Local tradition suggests that the Romans established a track into the area as part of the military occupation of Wales around AD78.

The strategic location in mid-Wales was the site of several conferences between north and south Wales princes in 540, 1140, and for the Council of Aberdyfi in 1216. The hill in the centre of the village, Pen-y-Bryn, has been claimed to be the site of fortifications in the 1150s, which were soon destroyed. The site of Aberdyfi Castle however is usually said to be at the motte earthworks further up the opposite side of the river near Glandyfi.

During the Spanish Armada of 1597, a Spanish ship, the Bear of Amsterdam, missed her objective at Milford Haven and ended up having accidentally entered the Dyfi estuary. She was unable to leave for 10 days because of the wind and could not be boarded as no suitable boats were available. An attempt to burn her was frustrated by winds and when she did leave she ended up being captured by a waiting English fleet off the Cornish coast.

In the 1700s, the village grew with the appearance of several of the inns still in current use (The Dovey Hotel, Britannia and Penhelig Arms). Copper was mined in the present Copperhill Street, and lead in Penhelig (Welsh: Penhelyg).

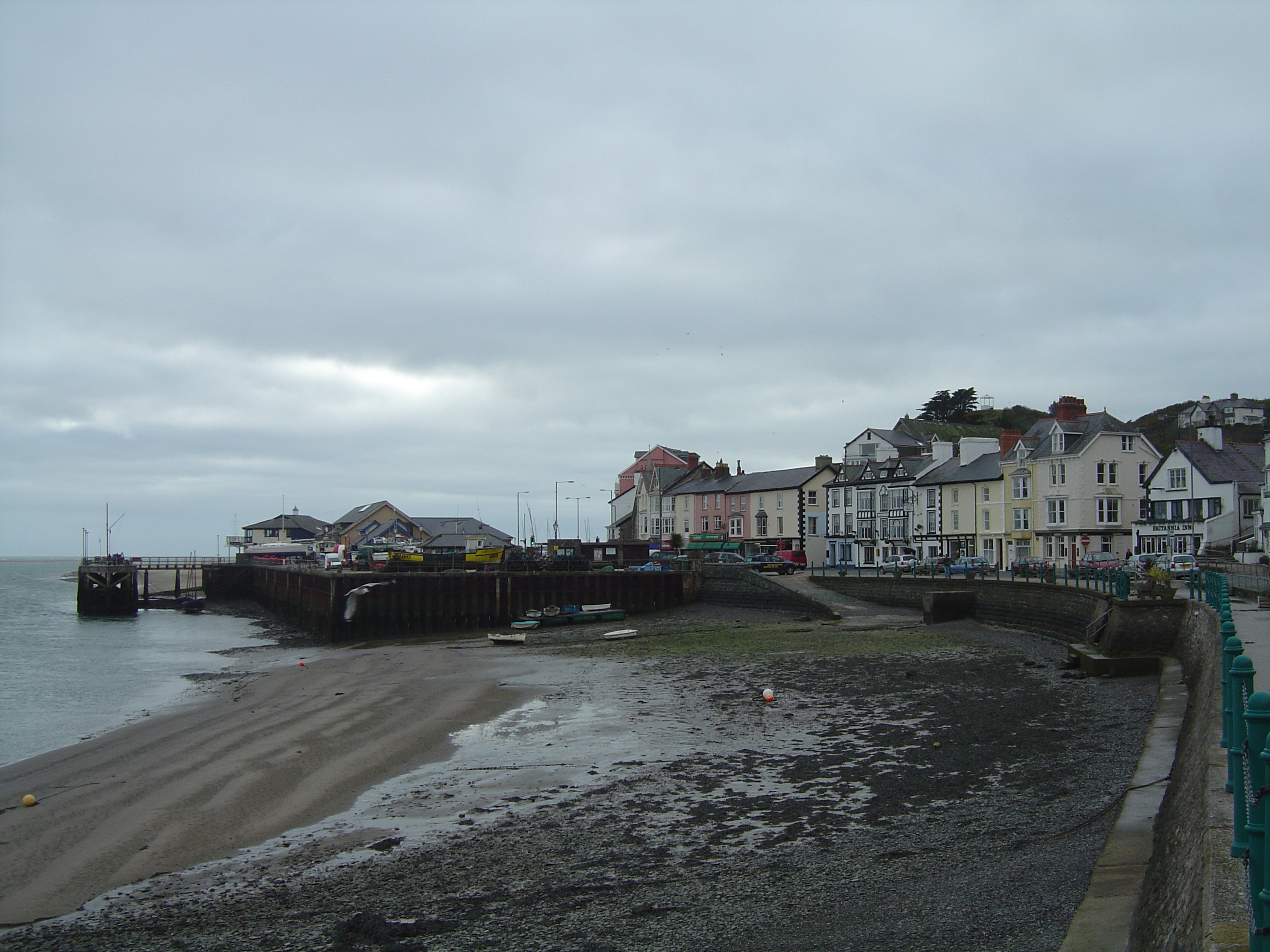
The harbour

=== Port and railway ===
In the 1800s, Aberdyfi was at its peak as a port. Major exports were slate and oak bark. Ship building was based in seven shipyards in Penhelig where 45 sailing ships were built between 1840 and 1880.

The railway came to the village in 1863 built by the Aberystwith and Welsh Coast Railway. Passengers were at first ferried across the river from Ynyslas, as the line to Dovey Junction and then Machynlleth was not completed until 1867. Due to public demand, this section had to use a long tunnel behind the village centre, and further major earthworks and tunnels were needed along the bank of the river. This line, which became part of the Cambrian Railways, and later the Great Western Railway, is particularly scenic.

A jetty was built in 1887, with railway lines connecting it with the wharf and the main line. The Aberdyfi & Waterford Steamship Company imported livestock from Ireland which were then taken further by the railway. Coal, limestone and timber were also imported.

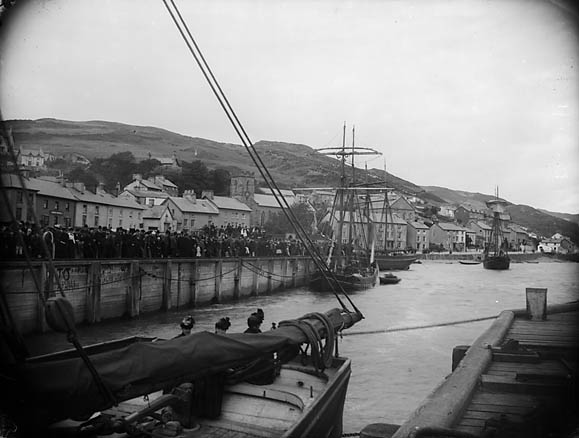
Crowds on the shore watching the regatta, circa 1885

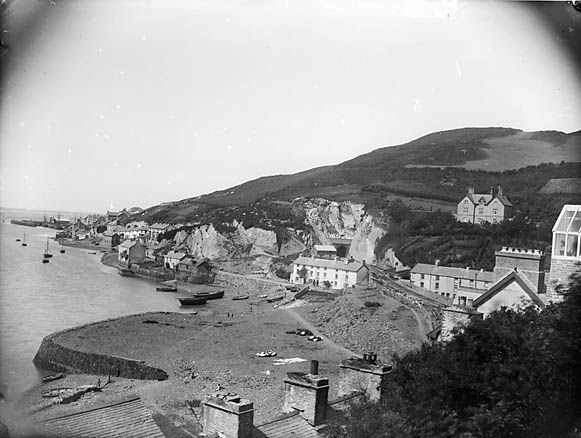
A view of the village from Penhelyg Rock, circa 1885

Local coastal shipping links with Liverpool were strong, with many Aberdyfi men sailing on international voyages from Liverpool. The SS Dora was one of the last ships trading between Aberdyfi and Liverpool and was scuttled, with no loss of life, by a German submarine in 1917.

The jetty and wharf continued in commercial use for coal until 1959. After prolonged negotiations, redevelopments from 1968 to 1971, including rebuilding the jetty, led to their present use mainly for recreational purposes. Some local fishing still occurs.

The first ever Outward Bound centre was opened in the village in 1941. Many of their activities involve the river, boats and jetty.

=== Lifeboat ===
The village's first lifeboat was bought in 1837. Run by the RNLI since 1853, it has taken part in many rescues, sometimes with loss of life of crew members. The current lifeboat, an Atlantic 75, is housed in the boathouse by the jetty and is launched using a lifeboat tractor. Currently it is averaging about 25 emergency launches each year.

== Governance ==
An electoral ward of the same name stretches inland along the A494 road and includes Pennal community. The total population of the ward taken at the 2011 census was 1,282.

== Worship ==
Chapels in Aberdyfi include the Welsh Calvinistic Methodist chapel, the English Presbyterian chapel, the Wesleyan Methodist chapel, and the Welsh Independent congregational chapel. The Anglican (Church in Wales) is St Peter's.

== Transport ==
Road access to Aberdyfi is by the A493, with Tywyn four miles to the north and Machynlleth 11 miles to the east. The village is on the Cambrian Coast railway line and has two railway stations, Aberdovey and Penhelig. Trains on the Cambrian Line are operated by Transport for Wales. The local bus service is operated by Lloyds Coaches with services to Tywyn, where a connection can be made for Dolgellau, and to Machynlleth, where connections are available to Aberystwyth.

A ferry used to operate across the River Dyfi to Ynyslas. The last ferryman was Ellis Williams.

== Recreation ==
Popular recreational activities focus on the beach and watersports, such as windsurfing, kitesurfing, fishing, crabbing, sailing, and canoeing on the estuary.

Activities in Aberdyfi

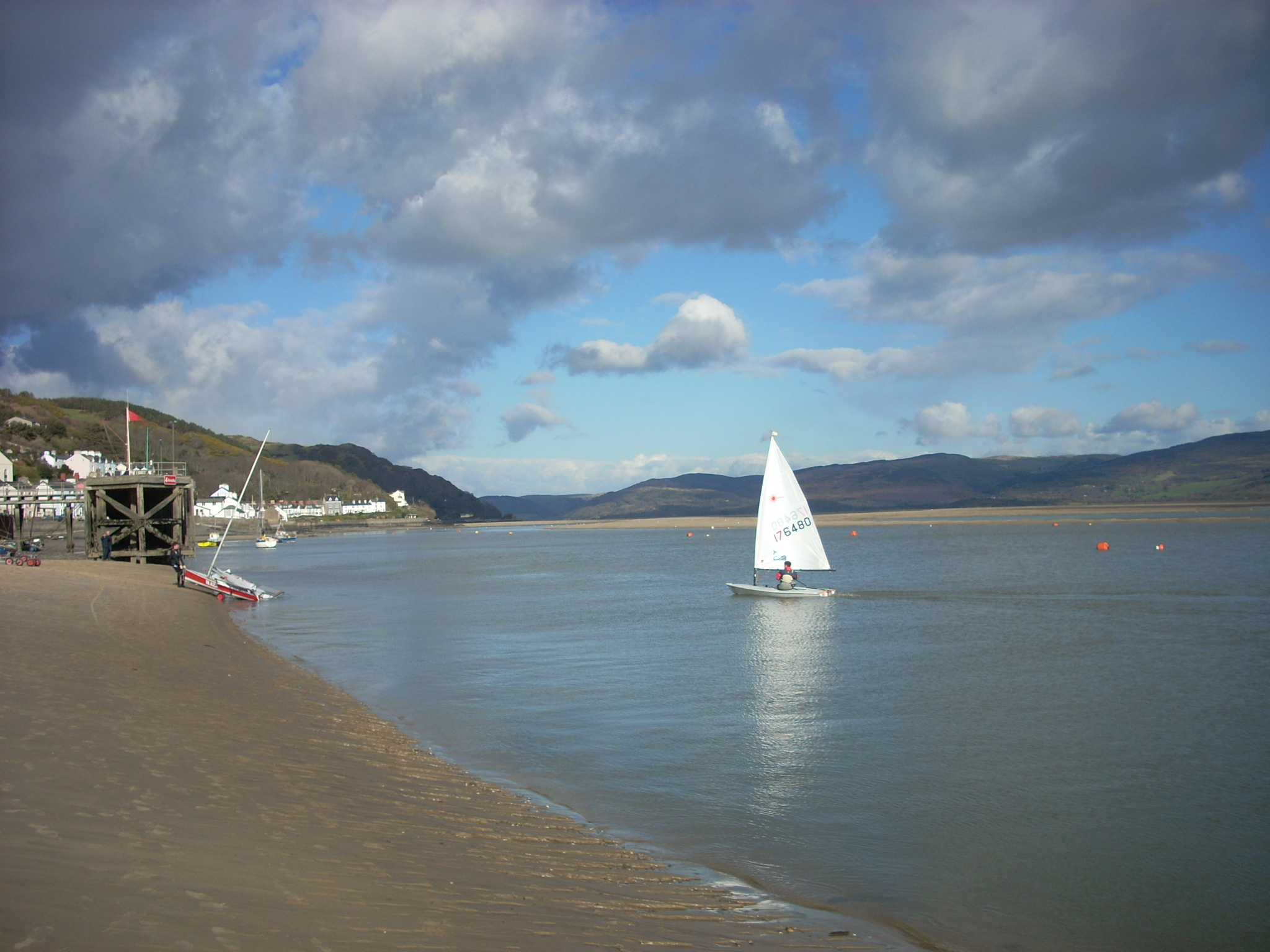
Sailing from the beach

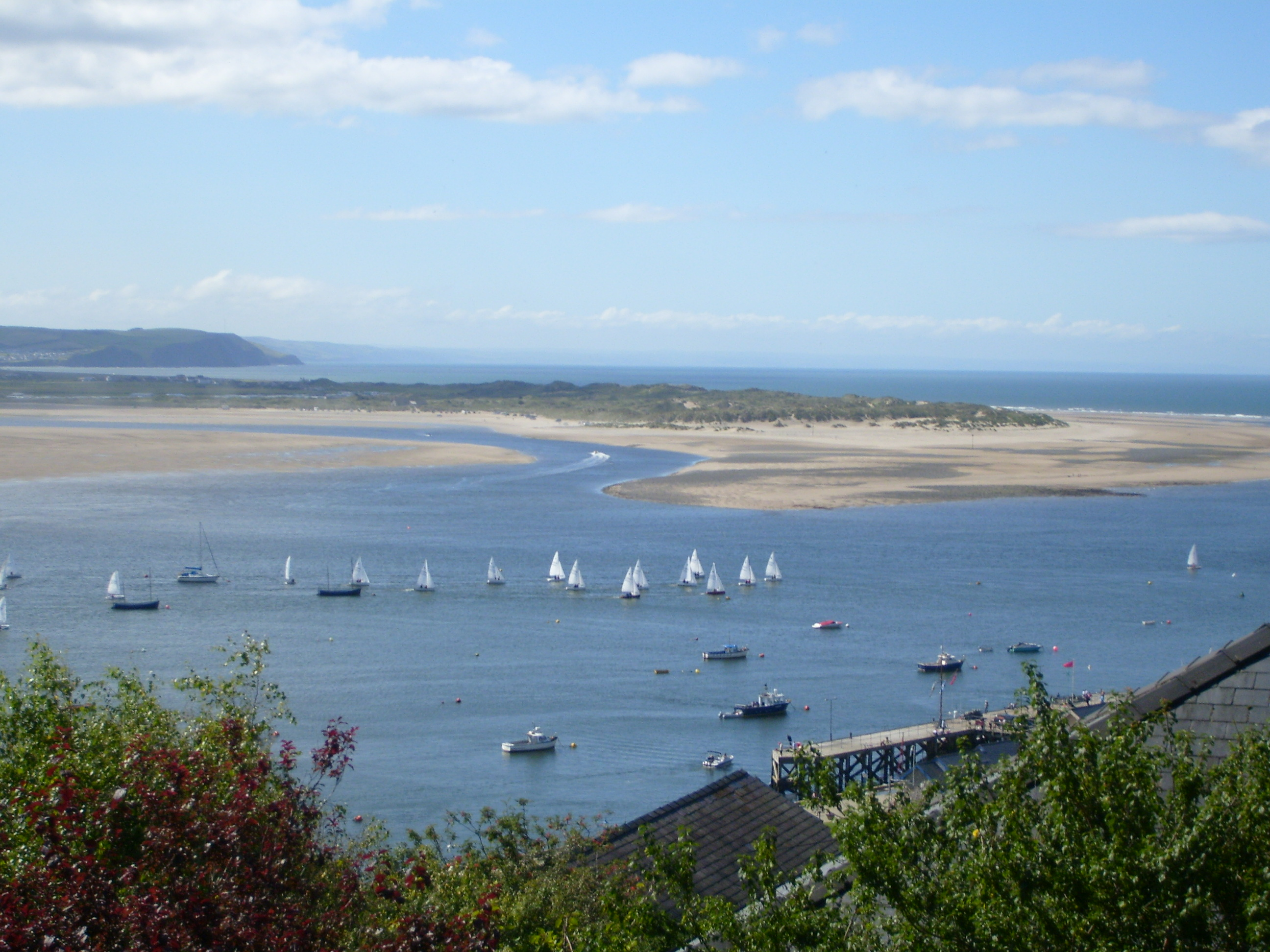
A dinghy race on the Dyfi estuary

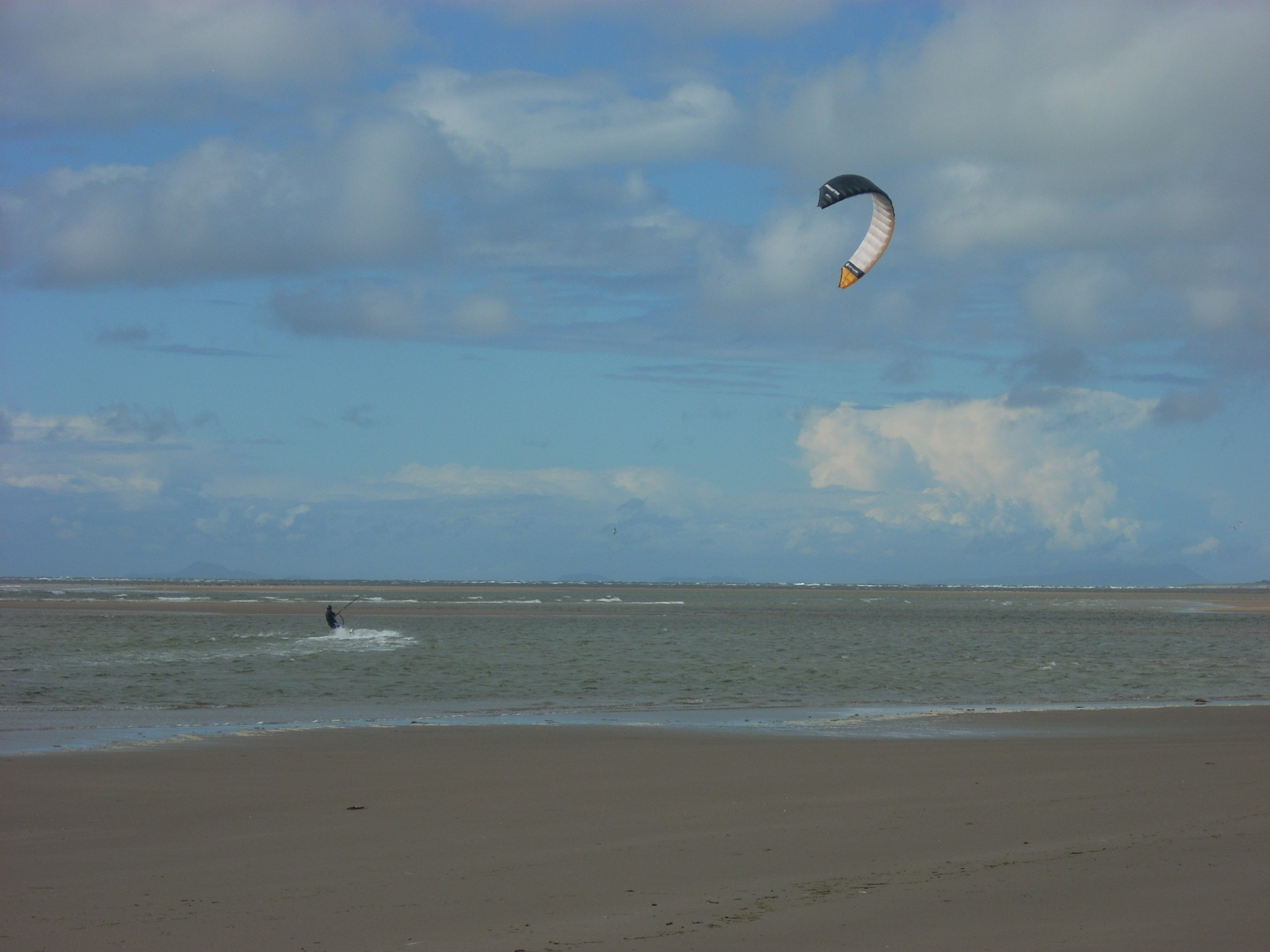
Kitesurfing on the estuary

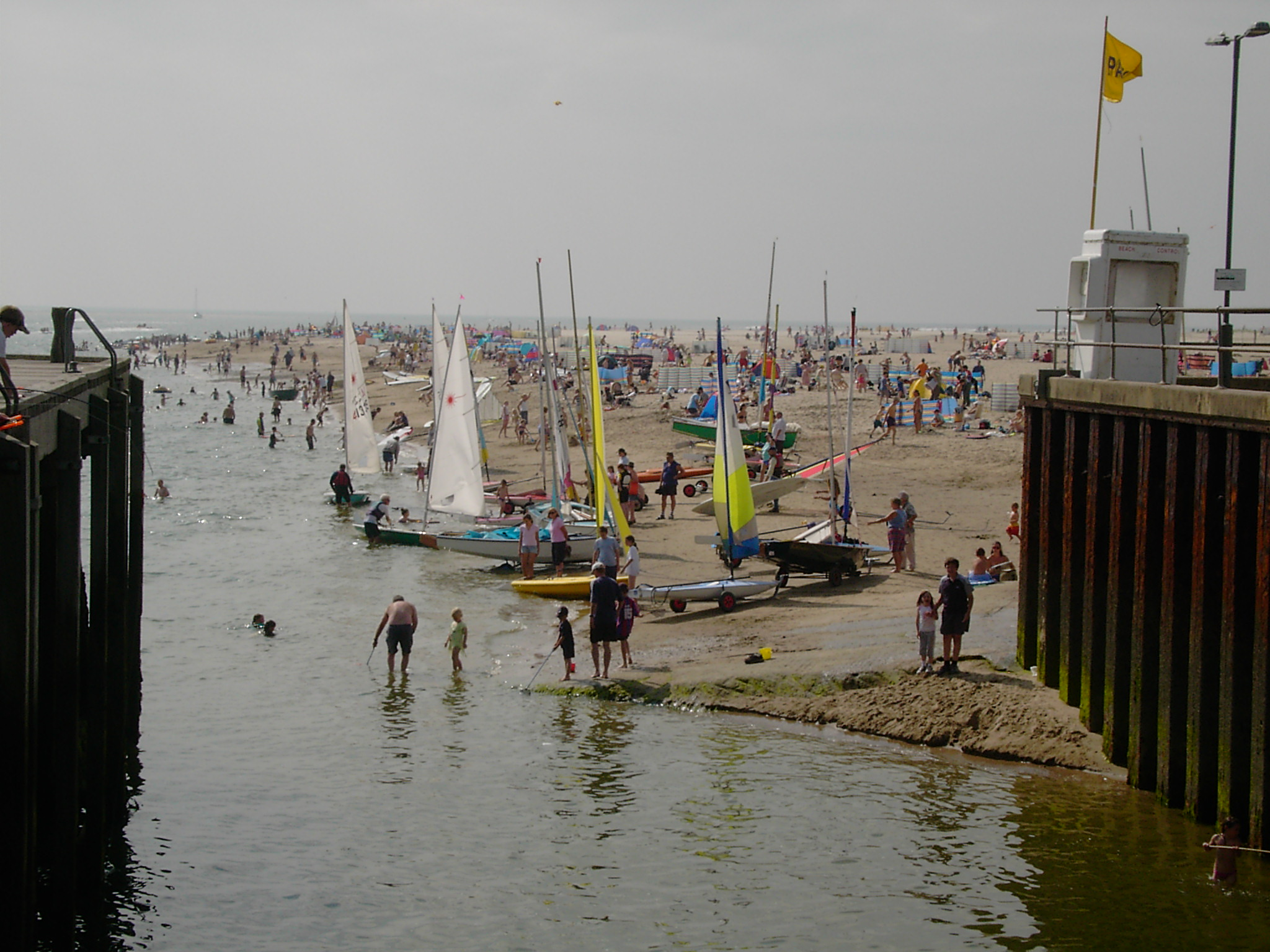
The beach on a busy Bank Holiday

The Dovey Yacht Club has a prominent position on the river front of the village. It was founded in 1949 and helped develop the popularity of the GP14 dinghy class. It organises races for dinghies throughout the season on the estuary of the River Dyfi.

The Aberdovey Golf Club, founded in 1892, is a famous 18 hole links course located near the railway station. It is world-renowned, having been described frequently and lyrically in the press by Bernard Darwin, the famed golf writer, who was a notable member of the club. In 1895, it was the location of the first Welsh Golfing Union Championship. Current members include Ian Woosnam and Peter Baker.

Located by the Aberdovey Golf Club was Aberdyfi Football Club until they folded in 2022. The football team won the Welsh Amateur Cup Competition in 1935.

The Aberdyfi Rowing Club rows in the Dyfi Estuary and Cardigan Bay and takes part in races all round the coast of Wales and internationally. They row 24’ long Celtic longboats, with four rowers (each with one oar) and a cox. They have three of these traditional Welsh boats with fixed seats and use these for races in Wales.

The Aberdovey Literary Institute, founded in 1882, is situated on the river front. The deeds of 1923 state it was established in perpetuity as "a non-sectarian, non-political place of recreation, education and social intercourse including ... reading rooms, writing rooms, library, billiard rooms, concert rooms ..."

Neuadd Dyfi is a community hall, conference centre and theatre owned by the village for village activities. It caters for a range of local organisations and events.

== Cultural references ==
=== The Bells of Aberdovey ===
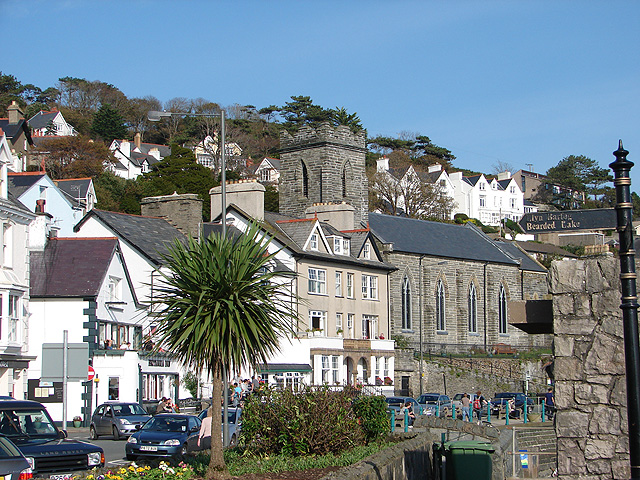
The bells of St Peter's Church can play The Bells of Aberdovey

Aberdyfi is closely linked to the legend of the submerged lost kingdom of Cantre'r Gwaelod (English: Lowland Hundred) beneath Cardigan Bay, and bells which, it is said, can be heard ringing beneath the water at the beach. The Bells of Aberdovey (Welsh: Clychau Aberdyfi) is a well-known song referring to this legend. This song first appeared in the English opera Liberty Hall in 1785, written by Charles Dibdin, and is not thought to be a traditional folk-song as Welsh words were written by John Ceiriog Hughes, during the 19th century.

The legend and the song have inspired local cultural projects involving bells.

A new chime of bells was installed in September 1936 in the tower of St Peter's Church, which overlooks the harbour. The ten bells, tuned in the key of A flat, were specifically designed to allow the playing of The Bells of Aberdovey and are played from a mechanical carillon inside the church.

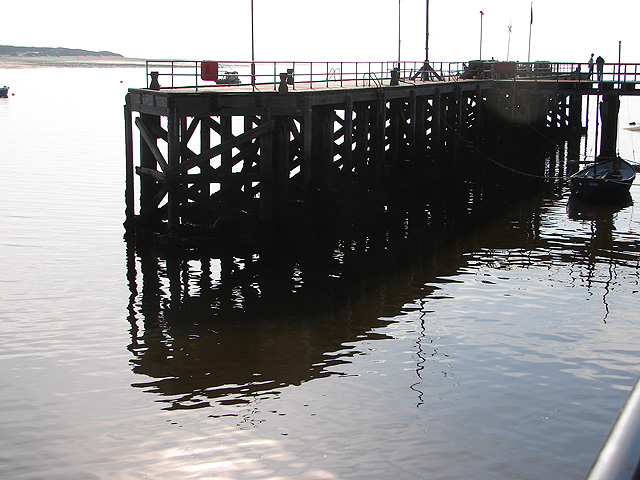
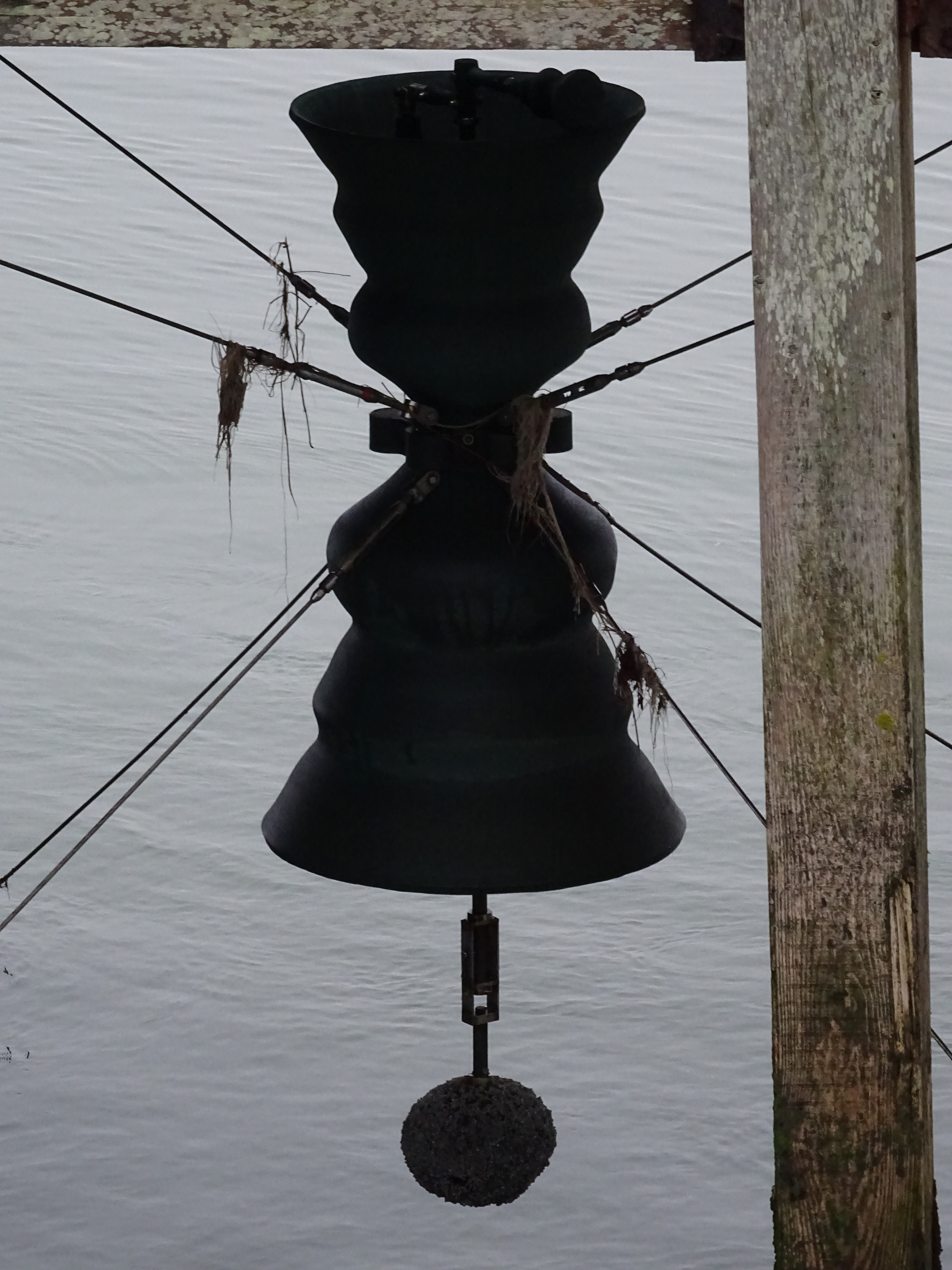
The pier (left) and the Time and Tide Bell beneath it (right)

In 2010 an art installation was commissioned from sculptor Marcus Vergette as a homage to The Bells of Aberdovey. The work is a bronze Time and Tide Bell suspended beneath the pier which is rung by the action of water at high tide. It was installed in July 2011 and is one of several such bells around the United Kingdom.

=== Other ===
To the east of Aberdyfi is a path from Penhelig to Picnic Island (Welsh: Bryn Llestair) known as the Old Roman Road (Welsh: Hen Ffordd Rufeinig). In reality, the path is known to have existed as early as the 19th century and the nearest known Roman structure on this side of the estuary was the fort Cefn Caer at Pennal.

Bugail Aberdyfi (the Shepherd of Aberdovey) is a poem written by John Ceiriog Hughes which has been set to music and recorded by several singers including Bryn Terfel.

The children's novel, Silver on the Tree, by Susan Cooper, the final book of The Dark is Rising, is largely set around Aberdyfi, with many references to local landmarks.

The novel, Megan's Game by Tony Drury, published in 2012, contains many references to Aberdyfi, surrounding areas and the legend of The Bells of Aberdovey.

== Notable people associated with Aberdyfi ==
- James Atkin, Baron Atkin of Aberdovey (1867–1944), Barrister and Judge
- John Corbett (1817–1901), industrialist, philanthropist and politician
- Tom Cave (born 1991), rally driver
- Christopher Riche Evans (1931–1979), psychologist, computer scientist, and author
- John T. Houghton (1931–2020), co-chair of the Intergovernmental Panel on Climate Change, lived in Aberdyfi
- Stan Hugill (1906–1992), Musician and artist, lived in Aberdyfi, and worked at the Outward Bound centre from 1950 to 1975
- David Gill (born 1957), chief executive of Manchester United and a vice chairman of The Football Association
- Marguerite Florence Laura Jarvis (1886–1964), novelist under using pseudonyms, including Countess Barcynska
- Simon Jenkins (born 1943), Journalist, editor, author, chairman of the National Trust
- Kenneth O. Morgan, Baron Morgan of Aberdyfi, (born 1934), Historian and author
- Oliver Onions (1873–1961), Novelist
- Jimmy Page (born 1944), with Robert Plant (born 1948), composed many Led Zeppelin songs at nearby Bron-Yr-Aur cottage
- Berta Ruck (1878–1978), Romantic novelist

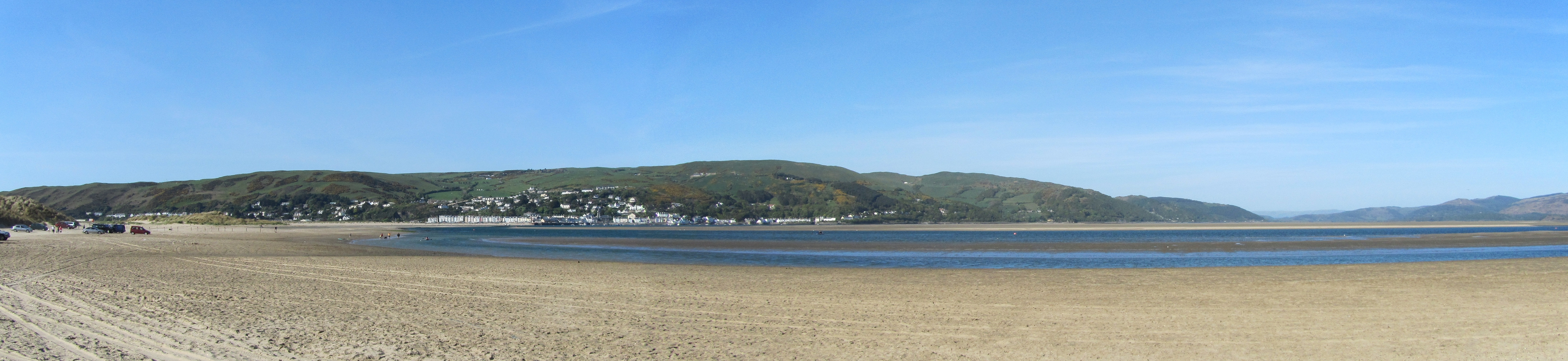
Aberdyfi and the Dyfi valley from Ynyslas Sand Dunes, April 2011

== See also ==
- Towyn power station
