= Tide table =

Tabulated data used for tidal prediction

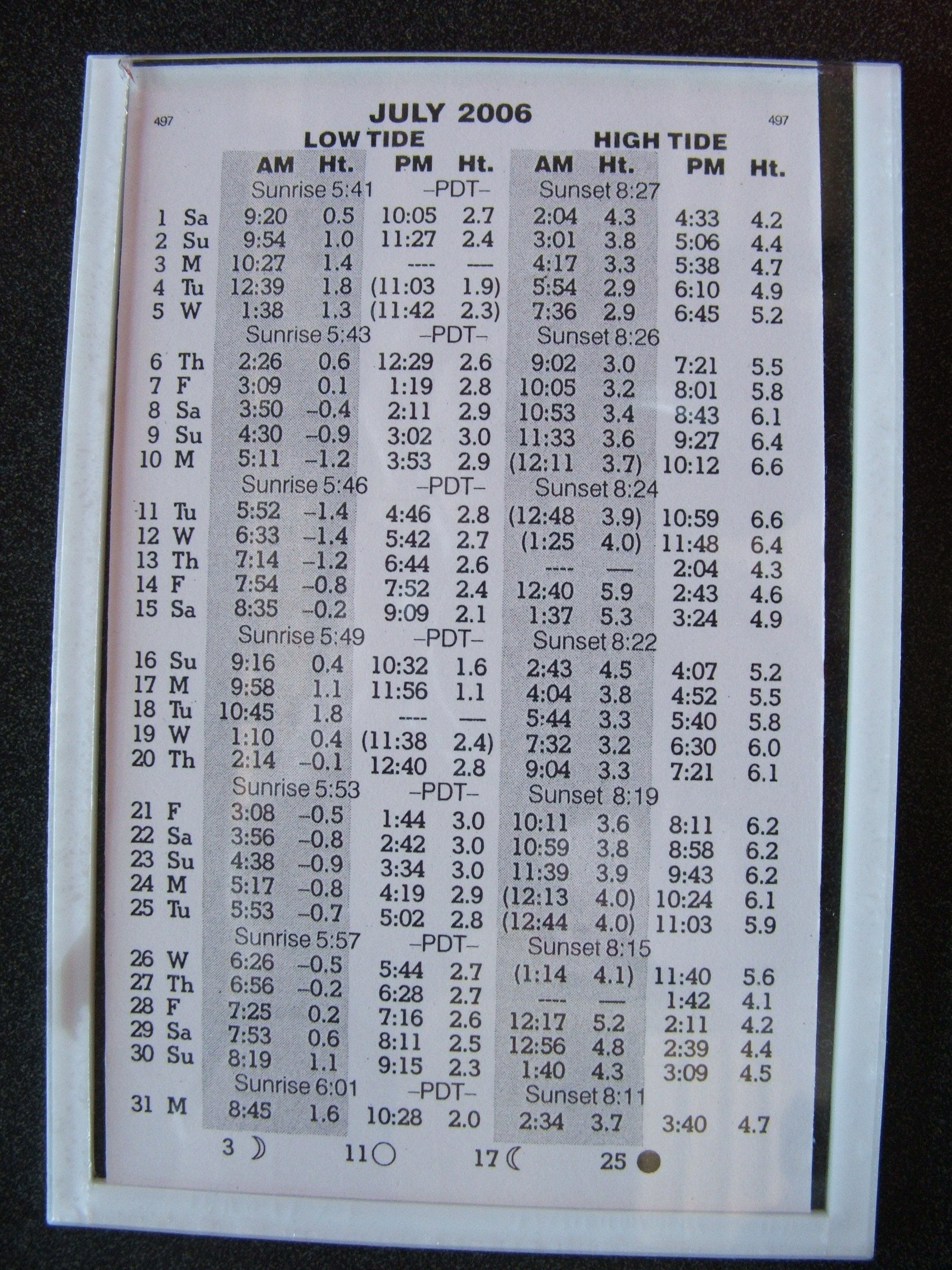
A tide table for Monterey Bay Aquarium

Tide tables, sometimes called tide charts, are used for tidal prediction and show the daily times and levels of high and low tides, usually for a particular location. Tide heights at intermediate times (between high and low water) can be approximated by using the rule of twelfths or more accurately calculated by using a published tidal curve for the location. Tide levels are typically given relative to a low-water vertical datum, e.g. the mean lower low water (MLLW) datum in the US.

== Publication and scope ==
Tide tables are published in various forms, such as paper-based tables and tables available on the Internet. Most tide tables are calculated and published only for major ports, called "standard ports", and only for one year — standard ports can be relatively close together or hundreds of kilometers apart. The tide times for a minor port are estimated by the tide-table user manually calculating using the published time and height differences between a standard port and the minor port.

== Dates and times ==
The dates of spring tides and neap tides, approximately seven days apart, can be determined by the heights of the tides on the classic tide tables: a small range indicates neaps and large indicates springs. This cycle of tides is linked to the phases of the moon, with the highest tides (spring tides) occurring near full moon and new moon.

However, successive (semidiurnal) tides are linked to the Moon's orbital period, thus they are approximately 24/27.3 hours later each day or about 50 minutes but many other observations and considerations are required to develop accurate tide tables. On the Atlantic coast of northwest Europe, the interval between each low and high tide averages about 6 hours and 10 minutes, giving two high tides and two low tides each day, with the highest tides about 2 days after full moon.

== Calculation ==
Tidal prediction was long beset by the problem of laborious calculations. Before the use of digital computers tide tables were often generated by the use of a special-purpose calculating machine, the tide-predicting machine.

== Tide times in art ==
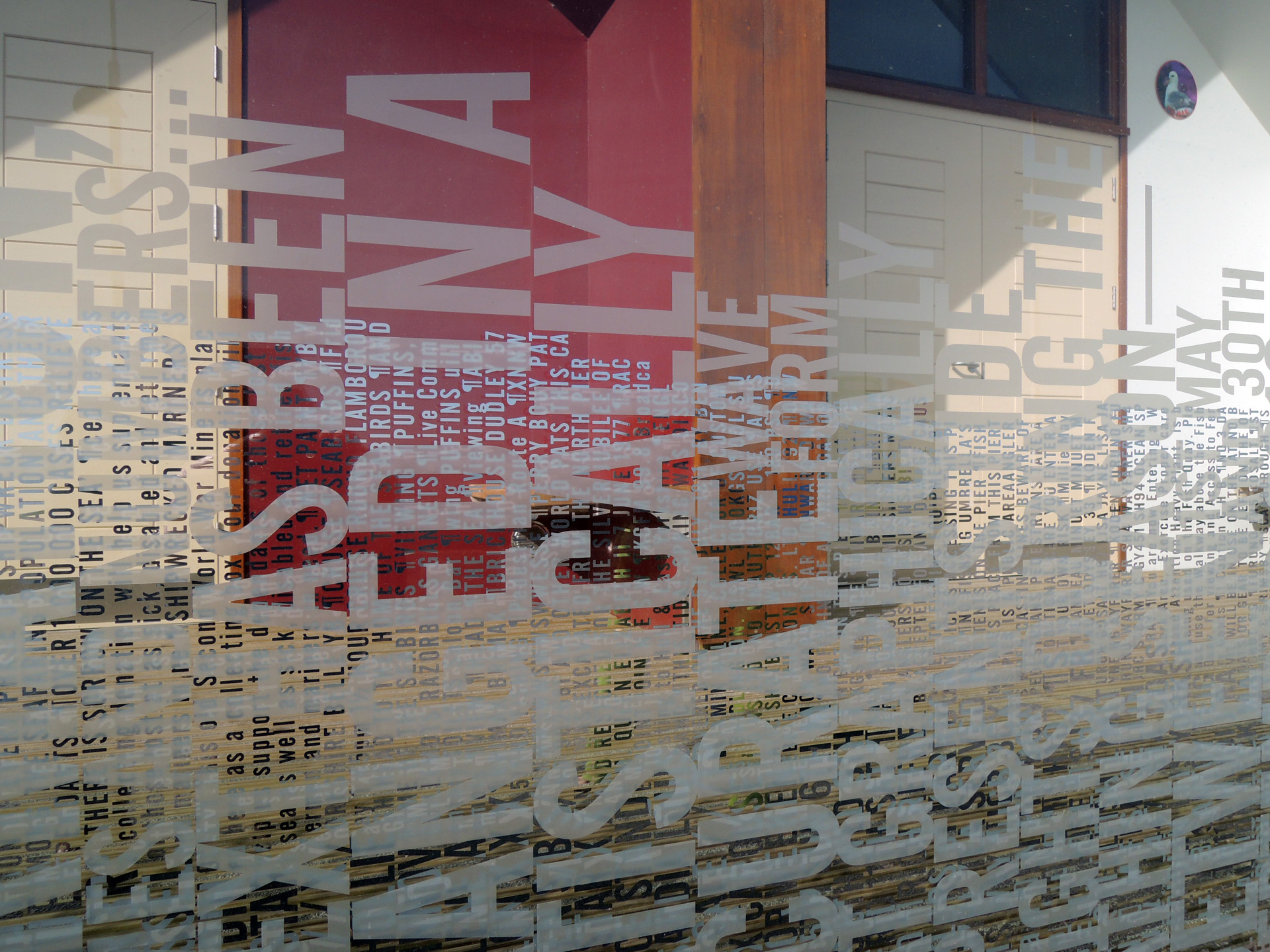
Tidal Word Wave artwork by Adrian Riley and Rachel Welford

Time and Tide Bell is an art project made up of bells, designed by sculptor Marcus Vergette, installed at coastal locations in the UK. Each bell rings at high tide, and rising sea levels caused by global warming will change the sounds made by the bells.

Tidal Word Wave is an architectural glass artwork created by Rachel Welford and Adrian Riley in Bridlington, East Yorkshire. Found text from the immediate environment is arranged in overlapping patterns arranged according to tide times for that location.

New Dawn is a glass artwork by Mary Branson in Westminster Hall, London, with light levels changing according to the tidal level of the River Thames.

== See also ==
- Solunar theory
