= The Bells of Aberdovey =

Welsh folk song

The Bells of Aberdovey (Welsh: Clychau Aberdyfi) is a popular song which refers to the village now usually known locally by its Welsh-language name of Aberdyfi (sometimes still anglicised as Aberdovey) in Gwynedd, Wales at the mouth of the River Dyfi on Cardigan Bay. The song is based on the legend of Cantre'r Gwaelod, which is also called Cantref Gwaelod or Cantref y Gwaelod (or in English: The Bottom or Lowland Hundred). This ancient sunken kingdom is said to have occupied a tract of fertile land lying between Ramsey Island and Bardsey Island in what is now Cardigan Bay to the west of Wales. The legend supposes that the bells of the submerged lost kingdom can be heard ringing below the waves on the beach at Aberdyfi.

== History ==
The song first appeared in 1785 in English in Liberty Hall which was a comic opera in two acts, written and produced by Charles Dibdin. It was first performed at the Theatre Royal in Drury Lane in London on 8 February 1785, and also contained other popular songs entitled Jock Ratlin, and The Highmettled Racer. The text to the opera, entitled "Liberty-Hall: or, a test of good fellowship. A comic opera, in two acts. As it is performed with the greatest applause at the Theatre-Royal in Drury-Lane" was published by the author, and printed and sold by G. Kearsley, in 1785. In Liberty Hall, the song was sung in Act II, scene V, by the comic Welsh character, Ap Hugh.

The song became popular and gained the reputation of being a traditional Welsh folk-song. Its origins have been disputed by several sources. An example of this discussion follows:

Frank Kidson wrote in the entry "Welsh Music - Doubtful Melodies" in Grove:

"Another illogical claim is for The Bells of Aberdovey (1844), which has long been included in Welsh collections as native of the soil, but is really the composition of Charles Dibdin, who, writing a song for it in broken Welsh, used it in his opera Liberty Hall (1786). Miss [Jane] Williams, hearing it traditionally, published a version of it in her collection of 1844, and from that time onward it has been accepted as genuine Welsh. There is certainly no evidence to show that Dibdin used an existing tune (it was quite opposed to his practice), and no copy can be found except Dibdin's of a date prior to 1844."

The song was often attributed to composer, song writer, scholar and singer John Thomas (1795-1871), also known by his bardic name Ieuan Ddu. The belief was that he had written it for one of his students, a talented singer of the time, Eliza Phillips, or Morfydd Glyntaf as she was known and it had been sung at an Eisteddfod in Abergavenny in 1838, but this was later discounted. Since Ieuan Ddu did many arrangements, it is possible that he did an arrangement of this song for Morfydd Glyntaf. Ieuan Ddu's book of Welsh airs, titled "The Cambrian Minstrel", does not contain The Bells of Aberdovey. There is no record of Ieuan Ddu ever claiming this song himself, and the idea of it being his composition seemed to gain popularity after his death. The belief was so popular that an article was written refuting the idea, describing 'Liberty Hall' as the true origins of the song.

The Welsh lyrics as they were popularly known in 1908 had first appeared in a collection of unpublished ancient Welsh Airs by folklore collector and musician Maria Jane Williams (1795-1873) at an Eisteddfod of the Abergavenny Cymreigyddion Society in 1838, where Maria was awarded a prize for her collection. Maria Jane Williams finally published the air with those lyrics in 1844 in her book "The Ancient National Airs of Gwent and Morgannwg" and it was the first publishing of the song with Welsh lyrics.

The Welsh words were also incorrectly attributed to John Ceiriog Hughes (1832-1887), a Welsh poet of the 19th century. Although he collected many Welsh folk-songs, he also rewrote many English songs into the Welsh language. However, this would have been after Maria Jane Williams had published the lyrics in Welsh.

A new, and very vocal claimant to the composition of the song arose in the 1850s, when the Merthyr soprano, Miss E[lizabeth] L[ucy] Williams (1828-1902), billed as 'The Welsh Nightingale' featured it largely in her one-woman show, on both sides of the Atlantic, letting it be understood that it was her own work (rather than a personal arrangement) to such an effect that her claims were very often believed.

There are several versions of this song in print in English and in Welsh. A widely used version was from The National Song Book of 1905. This gives the English words as written by the song collector and editor A.P.Graves. It also states that "The more appropriate title would probably be "The Bells of Abertawe" (Swansea, South Wales)". Other later references to Abertawe being its origin suggest this may be as there were church bells at Abertawe but not Aberdovey when the song was written.

== Lyrics ==
The most frequently used Welsh and English lyrics (which are not exact translations) are based on those in the National Song Book:

Welsh

Os wyt ti yn bur i mi
Fel rwyf fi yn bur i ti
Mal un, dau, tri, pedwar, pump, chwech
Meddai clychau Aberdyfi.
Un, dau, tri, pedwar, pump, chwech, saith
Mal un, dau tri, pedwar, pump, chwech
Meddai clychau Aberdyfi.

Hoff gan fab yw meddu serch
Y ferch mae am briodi
Hoff gen innau ym mhob man
Am Morfydd Aberdyfi.
Os wyt ti'n fy ngharu i
Fel rwyf i'n dy garu di
Mal un, dau, tri, pedwar, pump, chwech
Meddai clychau Aberdyfi.

Pan ddôf adref dros y môr
Cariad gura wrth dy ddôr
Mal un, dau, tri, pedwar, pump, chwech
Meddai clychau Aberdyfi.
Un, dau, tri, pedwar, pump, chwech
Mal un, dau, tri, pedwar, pump, chwech
Meddai clychau Aberdyfi.

Paid â'i wneud yn galon wan
Pan ddaw o dan dy faner
Os bydd gennyt air i'w ddweud
Bydd gwneud yn well o'r hanner
Os wyt ti'n fy ngharu i
Fel rwyf fi'n dy garu di
Mal un, dau, tri, pedwar, pump, chwech
Meddai clychau Aberdyfi.

English

If to me as true thou art
As I am true to thee, sweetheart
We'll hear one, two, three, four, five, six
From the bells of Aberdovey.
Hear one, two, three, four, five, six
Hear one, two, three, four, five and six
From the bells of Aberdovey.

Glad's a lad his lass to wed
When she sighed, "I love you!"
When but today on air I tread
For Gwen of Aberdovey.
While the heart beats in my breast
Cariad, I will love thee, by
One, two, three and all the rest
Of the bells of Aberdovey.

When I cross the sea once more
And love comes knocking at my door
Like one, two, three, four, five and six
Of the bells of Aberdovey.
One, two, three, four, five and six
Like one, two, three, four, five and six
Of the bells of Aberdovey.

Little loves and hopes shall fly
Round us in a covey
When we are married, you and I
At home in Aberdovey.
If to me as true thou art
As I am true to thee, sweetheart
We'll hear one, two, three, four, five, six
From the bells of Aberdovey.

Original version:

I

Do salmons love a lucid stream?
Do thirsty sheep love fountains?
Do Druids love a doleful theme?
Or goats the craggy mountains?

If it be true these things are so,
As truly she's my lovey,
And os wit I yng carie I
Rwy fi dwyn dy garie di
As—Ein dai tree pedwar pimp chweck—go
The bells of Aberdovey.

II

Do keffels love a whisp of hay?
Do sprightly kids love prancing?
Do curates crowdies love to play?
Or peasants morice-dancing?

If it be true these things are so,
As truly she's my lovey,
And os wit I yng carie I
Rwy fi dwyn dy garie di
As—Ein dai tree pedwar pimp chweck—go
The bells of Aberdovey.

Alternative versions:

Gaily ringing o'er the dales

Hear the silv'ry chime which hails
Those who come to fairest vales,
Greeting all to Aberdovey,
One, two, three, four how they ring!
And echoes answer as they sing,
The bells of Aberdovey.

Soft and clear thro' all the land,
The bells are calling clearly.
Ringing, Singing as we stand
In glades we love so dearly.
Welcome friends," we hear them say
"Welcome each and every day,
Listen all at work or play,"
Say the bells of Aberdovey.

In the peaceful evening time,

Oft I listened to the chime,
To the dulcet, ringing rhyme,
Of the bells of Aberdovey.
One, two, three, four, Hark! they ring!
Ah! long-lost thoughts to me they bring,
Those sweet bells of Aberdovey.

I first heard them years ago
When, careless and light-hearted,
I thought not of coming woe,
Nor of bright days departed;
Now those hours are past and gone,
When the strife of life is done,
Peace is found in heaven alone,
Say the bells of Aberdovey.

== Work inspired by The Bells of Aberdovey ==
The popular song and the legend of Cantre'r Gwaelod have been the inspiration for several cultural projects in Aberdyfi. A chime of bells in the tower of St Peter's Church was specifically designed to allow the playing of The Bells of Aberdovey from a mechanical carillon inside the church. A bronze time-and-tide bell art installation, suspended beneath Aberdyfi pier, was commissioned in 2010 from the sculptor Marcus Vergette as a homage to The Bells of Aberdovey.
