= Sans Souci Theatre =

Coordinates: 51°30′40″N 0°7′49″W

The Sans Souci Theatre was a 500-seat theatre located on Leicester Place, just off Leicester Square in the City of Westminster. It was built in 1796 by Charles Dibdin, and replaced eponymous former music rooms he had leased for performances, off the Strand.

== History ==
=== Early years ===
Charles Dibdin, a dramatist, musician and painter, had leased rooms near Southampton Street, off the Strand for musical recitals. The lease on these premises came due, and Dibdin found a location on a newly built street near Leicester Square that better suited his purposes. This location was surrounded by three structures that were immediately able to fulfil the part of walls for his theatre; and the interior of his existing rooms filled the space between perfectly. This enabled the new theatre to be built in only twelve weeks, to his personal design and supervision, at a cost of £6,000. The opening night was on 8 October 1796. The theatre was simple but elegant, with some of the interior decoration by Dibdin himself.

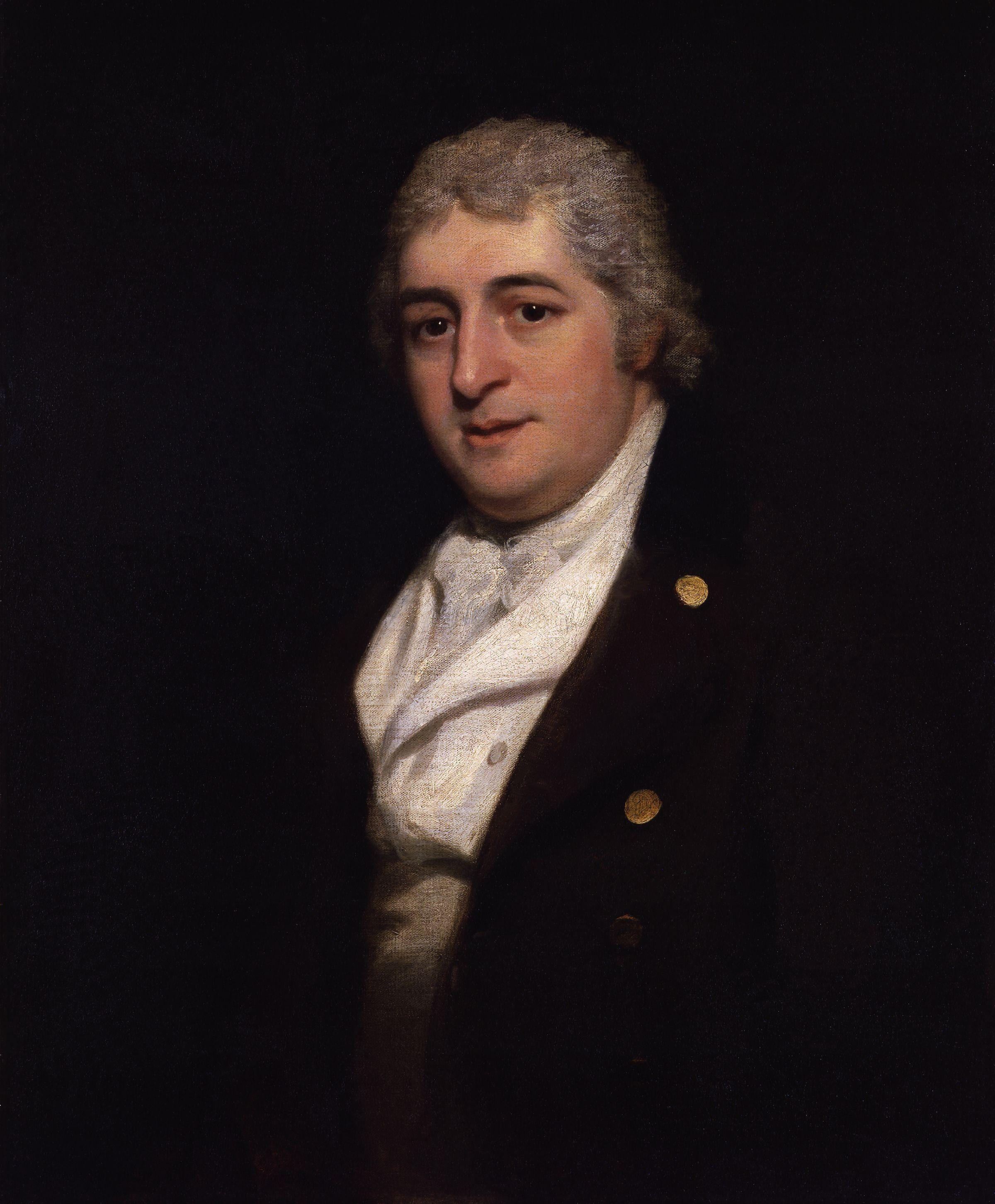
Charles Dibdin, 1799

From 1796 to 1804, Dibdin gave three performances a week, playing and singing his songs and performing in his plays and other entertainments (especially his entertainment, The Whim of the Moment). He wrote about 1,000 songs for the theatre, especially patriotic songs that inspired naval personnel during the naval war with France. Frederick Schirmer obtained a licence for the performance of 'Musical and Dramatical Interludes in the German Language' for one year from 22 June 1805. Schirmer called the theatre The German Theatre. Henry Francis Greville obtained another one-year licence for 'Plays and Entertainments performed by Children' in March 1806. He called the theatre The Academical Theatre.

=== Decline ===
On 4 July 1807 Dibdin leased the premises to Thomas Cane of the Strand, hosier, for sixty three years at an annual rent of £298. Dibdin, himself, subsequently became involved in financial difficulties and died in 1814. From 1808 to 1828, the rate books show that the premises were occupied as a warehouse by B. Carder and Company, army clothiers and tailors. In the early 1830s the theatre and shop appear to have been occupied by a Mr. Smythson, a dramatic agent and theatrical general factotum.

From 1832, occasional benefit and other performances were given, the theatre being sometimes called the Sans Souci and sometimes the Vaudeville Subscription Theatre. The rate books for this period give the occupant as Benjamin Palmer, but in 1835 he is described as 'Lost Insolvent'. In the following year the theatre was bought by Isaac Newton, a linen draper occupying adjoining premises in Leicester Square, who intended to use it as an annex to his shop. In 1841 it was occupied by a restaurateur, and from 1844 to 1857 the premises were known as the Hôtel de Versailles. The theatre was finally demolished in or before 1898, when Victory House, the headquarters of the NSPCC, was erected on the site.
