= Time and Tide Bell =

UK art project

Locations of the bells (those not yet installed marked with a hollow marker)

Time and Tide Bell is an art project made up of bells, designed by UK sculptor Marcus Vergette and Australian bell designer Neil McLachlan, installed at coastal locations in the UK. The first one was placed at Appledore, Devon, in 2009 and the seventh at Mablethorpe, Lincolnshire in June 2019. As of 2021 at least six further bells are planned, and funding obtained from the National Lottery Heritage Fund in 2018 will allow for up to sixteen bells in all to be installed.

Each bell rings around high tide; the bells provide a reminder that rising sea levels caused by climate change will make the pattern of their ringing change. There is every chance that some of the bells will have to be relocated in the twenty-first century.

== Location of the bells ==
Location	Date installed	Note	Coordinates	Image	Refs
Appledore, Devon, England	July 2009		51°03′19″N 4°11′28″W		
Bosta Beach, Great Bernera, Isle of Lewis, Outer Hebrides, Scotland	June 2010		58°15′26″N 6°52′53″W		
Trinity Buoy Wharf, London	September 2010		51°30′27″N 0°00′30″E		
Aberdyfi, Gwynedd, Wales	July 2011	Beneath the pier	52°33′23″N 4°01′45″W		
Cemaes, Anglesey, Wales	April 2014	Also known as St Patrick's Bell	53°24′48″N 4°26′52″W		
Morecambe, Lancashire, England	March 2019	On the north side of the landward end of the Stone Jetty	54°04′25″N 2°52′37″W		
Mablethorpe, Lincolnshire, England	June 2019		53°21′57″N 0°15′06″E		
Harwich, Essex, England	September 2022	Next to Low Lighthouse	51°56′48″N 1°17′24″E		
Par, Cornwall, England	April 2023	Par Beach	50°20′44″N 4°42′06″W		
Brixham, Devon, England	June 2023	Breakwater Beach	50°24′00″N 3°30′15″W		
Happisburgh, Norfolk, England	July 2023		52°49′28″N 1°31′53″E		
Isle of Wight, off Hampshire, England		Under development	50°40′N 1°16′W		
Redcar, North Yorkshire, England		Under development	54°37′4″N 1°4′8″W		

== Associated artworks ==
Sounds from the bells are featured on Vergette's album Tintinnabulation, released in March 2023 by the label Nonclassical.

The Time and Tide Bell Organisation have commissioned COTIDAL, a film by the Devon-based artist Tania Kovats. The intention is for the completed film to track high tide around the UK, and be 24 hours 50 minutes long. The first hour long chapter premiered in Appledore in September 2022.
