= Ann Greenly =

British geologist

Ann Greenly (née Barnard; 8 June 1852 – 1 March 1927) was the fourth of five daughters of John Barnard of Bath, a dispensing chemist. She is known for her geological work assisting her husband Edward Greenly in his surveying of Scotland and Anglesey, as well as being an accomplished artist and animal rights' representative. She died of heart failure on 1 March 1927, at the age of 75.

The "Annie Greenly Fund" for detailed geological mapping was established in her honour by the Geological Society of London.

== Personal life ==
Much of what we know about Annie Greenly comes from her husband's autobiographic work. Greenly grew up in Bath and Bristol in a liberal evangelical household. Her first introduction to geology came at age 11 when she witnessed an earthquake on 6 October 1863.

She first met her future husband, Edward Greenly in 1875 in Bristol. Their families were acquainted and encouraged the growing friendship between the two, which was built on philosophical and poetic exchanges and Edward's scientific studies. Greenly often helped the chemistry student with experiments in his home laboratory. When pressed by Edward's parents to either become engaged or break off the relationship, they separated and lost all contact for 11 years. Edward approached her again in 1890, and they soon got engaged and married on 26 September 1891. The couple had no children.

Greenly was blind in one eye from an early age. Due to worries for his wife's health, Edward Greenly retired from the Geological Survey in 1895, and the couple subsequently moved to Anglesey, where they continued their geological surveying and mapping, relying on a private income.

Despite her obvious interest in geology, she stressed "I am not a scholar". On top of her scientific role, Annie Greenly was a contralto singer, pianist, and a long-standing member of her local branch of the North Wales RSPCA.

Edward Greenly (and with him, Annie to a lesser extent) was a mystic who shifted from Evangelicalism to pantheistic religion and Buddhism. He strongly believed to be reunited with his wife, who had survived by almost a quarter of a century, in an afterlife.

== Geological career ==
Greenly became fully involved in her husband's geological work immediately after their wedding. "We have agreed that I am not to be ignorant of your subject… I can begin by reading. Put into our luggage some lucid elementary books."

Subsequently, She worked as Edward's field assistant who was working for the Scottish Geological Survey before retiring to Anglesey. She took control of logistics, arranged lodgings and facilities, prepared powdered mineral specimens, and proofread and edited his writing extensively. Edward reflects on her value as an assistant in one aspect:

"More than one geologist […] has been killed while examining railway cuttings. When the author was examining cuttings in Anglesey, Annie Greenly always came with him as train-watcher and with her at the top of the bank he was able to concentrate on the geology."

However, Greenly revolutionised her husband's surveying technique earlier than providing logistical and moral support. She encouraged him to follow the exemplary lead of his colleague Charles Clough’s in all but one respect:, "Let Clough be your model in precision, but do not follow him in style. Found your style on nature’s curves. Watch these wherever you can and where you cannot see them, feel them. To be true, a map must be beautiful." Edward claimed that his wife was "the initial source of [his] inspiration". Thus her sense of clarity and beauty was critical in developing her husband's mapping style, including the green line method for which Edward Greenly is famous today. A thin green line is placed on the map around all rock exposure highlighting the data that the geological interpretation of the map is based. In particular, Annie was instrumental for Greenly's map of Anglesey. She takes particular credit for the index to the Anglesey memoir now held in the National Museum of Wales.

Edward Greenly documents her continuous support: "some sheets she pronounced to be hopeless and these […] she rewrote altogether…we worked on opposite sides of the table, I writing, she doctoring." She was highly valued for her persistence and logic. Greenly was meticulous in the reading and editing of her husband's manuscripts, finishing a final piece of work only a week before her death.

Together with her husband, Greenly regularly attended the annual meetings of the Geological Section of the British Association for the Advancement of Science and other conferences and meetings. In 1903, she instigated the first-ever female participation in the conference dinner, which extended to other female geologists such as Gertrude Elles and Lady Teall.
