= Rule of twelfths =

Approximation to a sine curve

Graph showing relationships between the rule of twelfths (coloured bars), a sine wave (dashed blue curve) and a clockface, if high tide occurs at 12:00

The rule of twelfths is an approximation to a sine curve. It can be used as a rule of thumb for estimating a changing quantity where both the quantity and the steps are easily divisible by 12. Typical uses are predicting the height of the tide or the change in day length over the seasons.

== The rule ==
The rule states that over the first period the quantity increases by 1/12. Then in the second period by 2/12, in the third by 3/12, in the fourth by 3/12, fifth by 2/12 and at the end of the sixth period reaches its maximum with an increase of 1/12. The steps are 1:2:3:3:2:1 giving a total change of 12/12. Over the next six intervals the quantity reduces in a similar manner by 1, 2, 3, 3, 2, 1 twelfths.

Period	Rule or actual values	Increment			Cumulative		
Period	Rule or actual values	Exact value	Decimal	Relative size	Exact value	Decimal	Relative size
1	Rule	1 / 12	0.08333		1 / 12	0.08333	
1	Actual	(cos 0° - cos 30°) / 2	0.06699		(1 - cos 30°) / 2	0.06699	
2	Rule	2 / 12	0.16667		3 / 12	0.25	
2	Actual	(cos 30° - cos 60°) / 2	0.18301		(1 - cos 60°) / 2	0.25	
3	Rule	3 / 12	0.25		6 / 12	0.5	
3	Actual	(cos 60° - cos 90°) / 2	0.25		(1 - cos 90°) / 2	0.5	
4	Rule	3 / 12	0.25		9 / 12	0.75	
4	Actual	(cos 90° - cos 120°) / 2	0.25		(1 - cos 120°) / 2	0.75	
5	Rule	2 / 12	0.16667		11 / 12	0.91667	
5	Actual	(cos 120° - cos 150°) / 2	0.18301		(1 - cos 150°) / 2	0.93301	
6	Rule	1 / 12	0.08333		12 / 12	1	
6	Actual	(cos 150° - cos 180°) / 2	0.06699		(1 - cos 180°) / 2	1	

== Applications ==
A regular dodecahedron (grey) approximated with a lattice polygon using the rule of twelfths (red)

In many parts of the world the tides approximate to a semi-diurnal sine curve; that is, there are two high- and two low- tides per day. As an estimate then each period equates to 1 hour, with the tide rising by 1, 2, 3, 3, 2, finally 1 twelfths of its total range in each hour, from low tide to high tide in about 6 hours, then the tide is decreasing by the same pattern in the next 6 hours, back to low tide. In places where there is only one high and one low water per day, the rule can be used by assuming the steps are 2 hours. If the tidal curve does not approximate to a sine wave then the rule cannot be used. This is important when navigating a boat or a ship in shallow water, and when launching and retrieving boats on slipways on a tidal shore.

The rule is also useful for estimating the monthly change in sunrise and sunset and thus day length.

== Example calculations ==
=== Tides ===
If a tide table gives the information that tomorrow's low water would be at noon and that the water level at this time would be two metres above chart datum, and that at the following high tide the water level would be 14 metres, then the height of water at 3:00 p.m. can be calculated as follows:

- The total increase in water level between low and high tide would be: 14 - 2 = 12 metres.
- In the first hour the water level would rise by 1 twelfth of the total (12 m) or: 1 m
- In the second hour the water level would rise by another 2 twelfths of the total (12 m) or: 2 m
- In the third hour the water level would rise by another 3 twelfths of the total (12 m) or: 3 m
- This gives the increase in the water level by 3:00 p.m. as 6 metres.

This represents only the increase - the total depth of the water (relative to chart datum) will include the 2 m depth at low tide: 6 m + 2 m = 8 metres.

The calculation can be simplified by adding twelfths together and reducing the fraction beforehand:

Rise of tide in three hours $=\left({1\over12}+{2\over12}+{3\over12}\right)\times 12 \ \mathrm{m}=\left({6\over12}\right)\times12 \ \mathrm{m}=\left({1\over2}\right)\times12 \ \mathrm{m}=6 \ \mathrm{m}$

=== Daylength ===
If midwinter sunrise and set are at 09:00 and 15:00, and midsummer at 06:00 and 18:00, the daylight duration will shift by 0:30, 1:00, 1:30, 1:30, 1:00 and 0:30 over the six months from one solstice to the other. Likewise the day length changes by 0:30, 1:00, 1:30, 1:30, 1:00 and 0:30 each month. More equatorial latitudes change by less, but still in the same proportions; more polar by more.

== Caveats ==
The rule is a rough approximation only and should be applied with great caution when used for navigational purposes. Officially produced tide tables should be used in preference whenever possible.

The rule assumes that all tides behave in a regular manner, this is not true of some geographical locations, such as Poole Harbour or the Solent where there are "double" high waters or Weymouth Bay where there is a double low water.

The rule assumes that the period between high and low tides is six hours but this is an underestimate and can vary anyway.

== Refinement ==
The rule relies on the approximation of tan 60° or √3 (~1.732) with 5/3 (~1.667) yielding 3.77% error. The next best rational approximation, 7/4 (1.75) yields 1.04% error. The steps are 1:3:4:4:3:1 giving a total change of 16/16:

Period	Rule or actual values	Increment			Cumulative		
Period	Rule or actual values	Exact value	Decimal	Relative size	Exact value	Decimal	Relative size
1	Rule	1 / 16	0.0625		1 / 16	0.0625	
1	Actual	(cos 0° - cos 30°) / 2	0.06699		(1 - cos 30°) / 2	0.06699	
2	Rule	3 / 16	0.1875		4 / 16	0.25	
2	Actual	(cos 30° - cos 60°) / 2	0.18301		(1 - cos 60°) / 2	0.25	
3	Rule	4 / 16	0.25		8 / 16	0.5	
3	Actual	(cos 60° - cos 90°) / 2	0.25		(1 - cos 90°) / 2	0.5	
4	Rule	4 / 16	0.25		12 / 16	0.75	
4	Actual	(cos 90° - cos 120°) / 2	0.25		(1 - cos 120°) / 2	0.75	
5	Rule	3 / 16	0.1875		15 / 16	0.9375	
5	Actual	(cos 120° - cos 150°) / 2	0.18301		(1 - cos 150°) / 2	0.93301	
6	Rule	1 / 16	0.0625		16 / 16	1	
6	Actual	(cos 150° - cos 180°) / 2	0.06699		(1 - cos 180°) / 2	1	

The following best approximations are 19/11 (0.276% error) with steps 3:8:11:11:8:3, and 26/15 (0.074% error) with steps 4:11:15:15:11:4.
