= Edward Greenly =

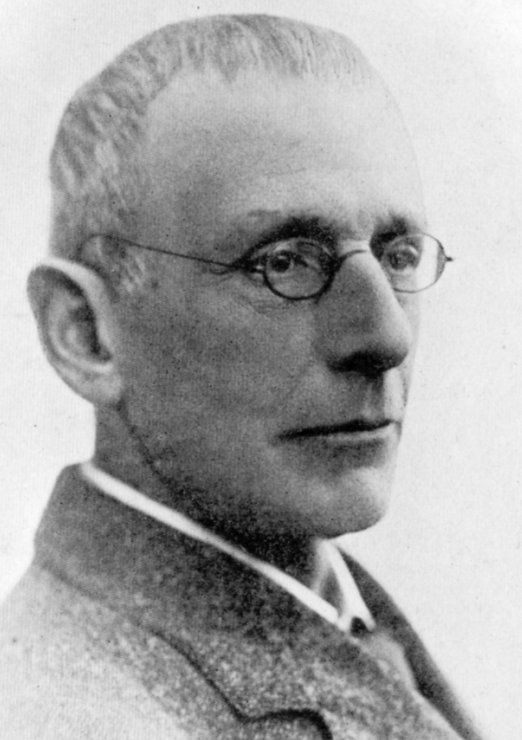
- Born: 3 December 1861; Bristol, England
- Died: 4 March 1951 (aged 89); Bangor, Gwynedd, Wales
- Occupations: Geologist, writer

Edward Greenly (3 December 1861 – 4 March 1951) was an English geologist known for his a detailed geological survey of the island of Anglesey. The Geology of Anglesey was published in two volumes in 1919 and followed by a one-inch geological map in 1920.

== Biography ==
Edward Greenly was born in Bristol, the only child of a doctor, Charles Hickes Greenly, and his wife, the former Harriet Dowling. He attended Clifton College, then University College London, where he studied petrology with Thomas George Bonney and received his D.Sc.

Greenly left school and joined the Geological Survey in 1889, and spent the next six years surveying the northwest Scottish Highlands. He resigned the Survey in 1895. Soon, he began an independent survey of Anglesey which took him until 1910 to complete, and nine more years to get the results published. During the survey, he named mélange, the geological phenomenon previously described as crush breccia.

The two-volume product of his years of work, The Geology of Anglesey, was published in 1919. The accompanying map was published the following year, delayed by World War I.

In addition to the Anglesey work, Greenly co-authored a text on surveying (Methods of Geological Surveying, 1930), and an autobiography, A Hand Through Time: Memories Romantic (1938).

== Personal life ==
Greenly met Ann Bernard (1852–1927) when he was very young, in 1875. They married in 1891. Annie studied geology informally, and was a contributor to Edward's work as an assistant and editor. She created the massive index to the Anglesey survey. (Her handwritten draft, with papers strung on thread, is now in the National Museum of Wales.)

After the Anglesey survey, the Greenlys lived in Bangor, and worked together on a small textbook, The Earth, right before Annie's death in 1927. Edward died in 1951, age 90. His remains are with his wife's, in a churchyard at Llangristiolus.

Greenly endowed the Annie Greenly Fund with the Geological Society, to support mapping projects.

Bangor University holds a small collection of papers and letters belonging to Greenly.

He contributed several articles to the Rationalist Press Association Annual.

== Christ myth theory ==
Greenly was an advocate of the Christ myth theory. He was the author of the booklet The Historical Reality of Jesus: A Concise Statement of the Problem (1927). It contains a summary of the arguments supporting the non-historicity of Jesus found in the works of J. M. Robertson, Arthur Drews, Thomas Whittaker, and Paul-Louis Couchoud.

The booklet was reprinted in Gordon Stein's An Anthology of Atheism and Rationalism in 1980. Stein considered it the "best short summary that exists of the vastly complex problem of determining whether Jesus, called Christ, was a historical human being or only a concretion of earlier myths given human form."

== Honours ==
- Honorary member of the Geological Societies of Edinburgh and Liverpool
- Honorary member of the Anglesey Antiquarian Society
- Lyell Medal of the Geological Society (1920)
- Medal of the Liverpool Geological Society (1933)
- Honorary doctorate by the University of Wales (1920)

== Publications ==
- The Geology of Anglesey (1919)
- A Short Summary of the Geological History of Anglesey (1922)
- The Earth, Its Nature and History (1927)
- The Historical Reality of Jesus: A Concise Statement of the Problem (1927)
- Methods in Geological Surveying (1930) [with Howel Williams]
- A Hand Through Time: Memories Romantic and Geological; Studies in the Arts and Religion and the Grounds of Confidence in Immortality (1938)
