= Charles Dibdin =

English composer, musician, dramatist, novelist, singer and actor (1745–1814)

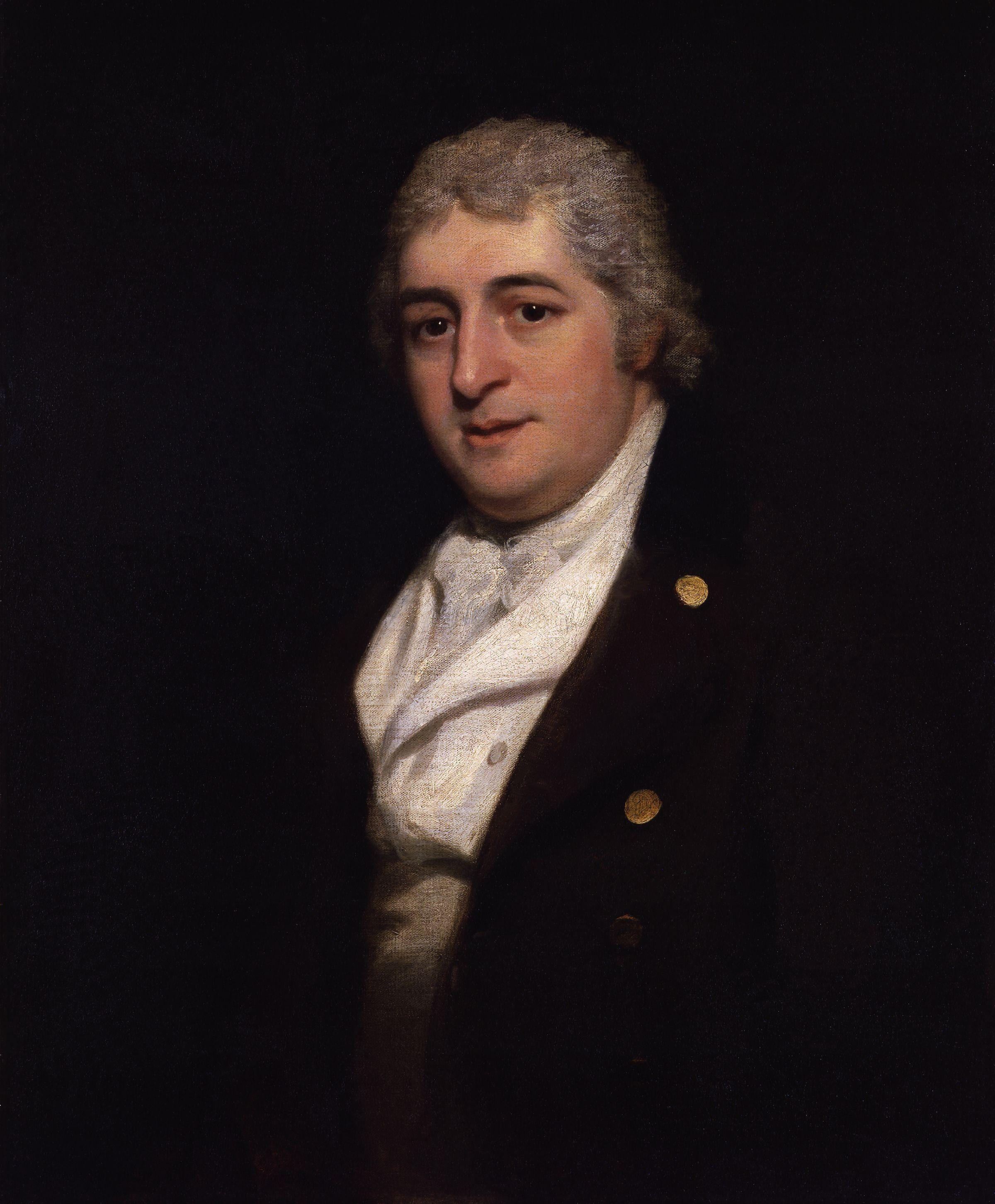
Charles Dibdin, 1799, by Thomas Phillips (died 1845), oil on canvas

Charles Dibdin (before 4 March 1745 – 25 July 1814) was an English composer, musician, dramatist, novelist, singer and actor. With over 600 songs to his name, for many of which he wrote both the lyrics and the music and performed them himself, he was in his time the most prolific English singer-songwriter. He is best known as the composer of "Tom Bowling", one of his many sea songs, which often features at the Last Night of the Proms. He also wrote about 30 dramatic pieces, including the operas The Waterman (1774) and The Quaker (1775), and several novels, memoirs and histories.

== Life and career ==
=== Early life and early successes ===
The son of a silversmith, Dibdin was privately baptised on 4 March 1745 in Southampton and is often described as the youngest child of eighteen born to a 50-year-old mother. His parents, intending him for the clergy, sent Dibdin to Winchester College, but his love of music soon diverted his thoughts from the clerical profession. He possessed 'a remarkable good voice' at a young age and was in demand for concerts even as a boy. Anthems were composed for him by James Kent and his successor Peter Fussell, organists of Winchester Cathedral, where he was a chorister between 1756 and 1759. He went to London at the age of fifteen at his brother's invitation, and was first employed tuning harpsichords in a music warehouse in Cheapside. Through Mr. Berenger he was introduced to John Rich (of whom he became a favourite) and John Beard, and, growing addicted to theatre-going, he soon became a singing actor at Theatre Royal, Covent Garden. As his voice was not yet settled, Rich thought he would become a bass, and marked out the pantomime roles of Richard Leveridge for him. Dibdin held back from this path, but made the most of his introductions: when Rich died in 1761 and Beard succeeded him as manager and part-proprietor, fresh opportunities arose.

With Beard's encouragement Dibdin wrote his first work, both words and music of The Shepherd's Artifice, an operetta in two acts, which was produced as Dibdin's benefit at Covent Garden on 21 May 1762 and repeated in 1763. As an actor, Dibdin had constant opportunities to study Garrick's performances, and befriended his associates, notably his prompter, who could remember Cibber. He enjoyed two seasons touring at the Vauxhall in Birmingham, and another at Richmond. Beard exercised a benign and encouraging influence over Dibdin's early career, choosing him, in his first important appearance, for the part of Ralph, in the 1765 premiere of Samuel Arnold's opera The Maid of the Mill at Covent Garden. He gained so much success over a run of more than fifty nights, that 'Ralph' handkerchiefs were worn in compliment to him. He agreed to article himself, both as actor and musician, to Beard for three years at a salary rising from three to five pounds a week. However, his contract established a precedent by which actors were not paid in case of absence through sickness.

The script for The Maid of the Mill was by playwright Isaac Bickerstaffe, who had written the libretto for Love in a Village, the highly popular opera (called the first English comic opera) by Dr. Thomas Arne, produced in 1762. For Dibdin the next turning-point was in the 1767 premiere and short run of Bickerstaffe's Love in the City, in which he played Watty Cockney, and for which he produced a good deal of the music and airs. He had already confided to Beard that he disliked acting because of the jealousy and spite which his success brought upon him from other actors. Hence he had turned again to composition. But now some of the orchestra complained to Beard that his music was discreditable to the theatre: whereupon Dibdin obtained the direct intervention of Dr. Arne, who (according to Dibdin) pronounced that this was a scandalous attempt to ruin the reputation of a young man whom it was their duty to encourage and protect. Love in the City was abandoned, but Dibdin's music was successful and was transferred into a play called The Romp. The association with Bickerstaffe continued in Dibdin's music for the play Lionel and Clarissa at Covent Garden in 1767, the year of Beard's retirement.

=== Drury Lane with Garrick ===
By 1768, his articles completed, and receiving harsh treatment from his new manager George Colman, Dibdin was ready to part company with Covent Garden. Garrick, who had coached him a little at Richmond in the previous year, was eager to win over Bickerstaffe to Drury Lane: and as hopes for his new play The Padlock projected for the Haymarket Theatre faded, Garrick acquired it, and acquired Dibdin as composer, whose music for this work was, at Garrick's suggestion, given anonymously. Dibdin made only £40 from it while Bickerstaffe made a fortune. The Padlock was produced at Drury Lane under Garrick's management in 1768, Dibdin taking the part of Mungo (a blackface role) so as to cause "that degree of sensation in the public which is called a rage."

In 1769 for Garrick (who had placed him under some financial obligation) he also composed for Garrick's Shakespeare Jubilee at Stratford, but found that Garrick had quietly substituted commissions to Arne and to Boyce. Garrick, it seemed, wished to control both Bickerstaffe and Dibdin, in case their work should find other patrons, and busied them both, inducing Dibdin to revise and write new music for Cibber's Damon and Phillida. In addition he provided the score for Bickerstaffe's burletta The Recruiting Serjeant, and for his The Maid the Mistress, and The Ephesian Matron in that year, which were all produced in 1769 at Ranelagh Gardens under a two-year contract with the Ranelagh managers for £100 per annum for whatever music he should supply them with.

Dibdin set a text by Garrick for The Installation of the Garter in 1771. In February 1773 the comic opera The Wedding Ring based on an Italian opera Il filosofo di campagna was brought out, but was almost withdrawn on the first night owing to the rumour that it was written by Bickerstaffe, who had fled to France, utterly ruined by the accusation of an 'abominable (i.e. homosexual) attempt'. Dibdin was obliged to appear on stage and claim authorship of both words and music, while salacious tittle-tattle (and worse) sought to embroil both him and Garrick in Bickerstaffe's offence. In November 1773, in a production of the musical drama The Deserter which he had adapted from the French opera of 1769 by Michel-Jean Sedaine and Pierre-Alexandre Monsigny, he introduced the song 'There was a miller's daughter' and modified other songs without Garrick's knowledge or consent, but with great success. During the same year he worked closely with Garrick at Hampton to compose songs and music for Garrick's winter piece, The Christmas Tale. From this ordeal he acquired the technique of composing the music entire in his mind, writing down nothing until the finished manuscript was needed: to this method he afterwards adhered.

Meanwhile, from 1772 he was also engaged by Thomas King to write regularly for Sadler's Wells, and in that year produced songs for the Musical Dialogues The Palace of Mirth and Bickerstaffe's The Brickdustman. He followed that in 1773 with the interlude The Mischance, and the dialogues The Grenadier (text by Garrick), The Ladle, England against Italy, and None so blind as those who won't see: and furthermore in the same year he wrote songs for The Trip to Portsmouth (words by G. A. Stevens), performed by Charles Bannister at the Haymarket, for which the overture and dances were written by Thomas Arne.

Dibdin's most lasting opera, The Waterman, a comic opera, the music of which he sold for £30, was produced first at the Haymarket Theatre in 1774. His dialogues and songs for The Cobbler, or, A Wife of Ten Thousand (based on Sedaine's Blaise le savetier), were acted as a ballad opera at Drury Lane in 1774, and his famous short opera The Quaker was produced there on 3 May 1775, which Dibdin had sold to Brereton for £70, who sold it on to Garrick for a hundred. Charles Bannister was again prominent in the cast of all three operas. After being connected with Drury Lane both as composer and as actor for several years, a series of disagreements with Garrick, partly over Dibdin's desertion of his second partner Mrs Davenet and his children by her, led to the termination of his engagement.

=== Sadler's Wells, Haymarket and Covent Garden ===
Despite the rift with Garrick, Dibdin's output continued successfully. The dialogue The Imposter, or, All's not gold that glitters, was written for Sadler's Wells in 1776, and his comic opera The Metamorphosis modelled on Molière's Sicilian, but with songs and music his own, was performed at the Haymarket in the same year. His comic opera The Seraglio, incorporating the famous rondeau song 'Blow High, Blow Low' (written during a gale returning from Calais) was first acted at Covent Garden in November 1776. It’s debated amongst scholars whether the libretti or music influenced Mozart whilst writing his more famous 1782 opera Die Entführung aus dem Serail (The Abduction from the Seraglio). The productive season of 1777 included songs for The vineyard revels (a pantomime), She is mad for a husband, Yo, Yea, or, The friendly tars, The old woman of eighty and The razor grinder, all at Sadler's Wells. In 1778 the important burletta Poor Vulcan was produced at Covent Garden, but in Dibdin's absence in France many of the songs were altered by another hand. There also he wrote the libretto of The Gipsies, for which Thomas Arne wrote the music, first performed at the Haymarket in 1778.

On his return from France in 1778 Thomas Harris, the theatre manager, appointed him musical director at Covent Garden (to write exclusively for him) at the then huge salary of £10 (equivalent to £1,377 in 2025) a week. Attempting to introduce a taste for the French variety theatre, he had adapted six short interludes, with his own music, with a view that one should be introduced between the play and the farce usually presented on the same evening. They included Rose and Colin, Wives revenged and Annette and Lubin; but Harris instead lumped them together as an after-piece and Dibdin's subtler intention was thwarted. In the following January his speaking pantomime The Touchstone (with songs) was produced, but Mr Pilon, Mr Cumberland, Mrs Cowley and Mr Lee Lewis were permitted to alter it so much that it became almost unrecognisable. However, Dibdin did accept two clever emendations suggested by Garrick, which resulted in a reconciliation between the two men: it is claimed that Garrick's very last step upon the stage was during a rehearsal for The Touchstone a night or two before the opening.

Covent Garden productions continued with The Chelsea pensioners, and The Mirror, or, Harlequin everywhere (a pantomime) (both 1779), and in 1780 the comic opera The Shepherdess of the Alps, and the three-act opera The Islanders, most of which was re-presented as a two-act farce called The Marriage Act in 1781. After the British victory at the Siege of Savannah, he added a scene in The Mirror depicting British grenadiers (one of whom was played by Frederick Charles Reinhold) defeating the Comte d'Estaing, leader of the French forces during the battle, and then singing "The British Grenadiers." He also arranged, wrote and composed the 1780 Christmas pantomime, Harlequin freemason, for which Messink (Garrick's pantomime specialist) contributed the inventions. In 1781 Dibdin adapted John Dryden's play Amphytrion, or Juno and Alcmena into an opera. He attempted to rewrite it so as to avoid some of the impropriety of the original, and was at first encouraged by Harris, who later changed his mind. Dibdin was left with a difficult task and the result was not a popular success.

=== The Royal Circus and other ventures ===
There was then an argument between Dibdin and Harris over payment for the work, with the result that Dibdin instead embarked on a project to construct the Royal Circus, (afterwards known as the Surrey Theatre) for mixed entertainments of various kinds, he planning to form a combination of the stage and an equestrian ring or hippodrome. Several parties including the landowner advanced the funds and became proprietors, and Dibdin was appointed sole manager for life, to receive a quarter of the profits. Dibdin is credited with coining the term "circus".

Meanwhile, a dialogue, The Fortune Hunter, had appeared at Sadler's Wells in 1780, and at the Haymarket. Dibdin had contributed songs to an entertainment called Pasquin's Budget in which characters were represented by puppets, and their songs were performed by singers behind the scenes. It is said that in The Comic Mirror Dibdin had ridiculed prominent contemporary figures through the medium of a puppet show. Such things had been tried elsewhere, for instance at the Marylebone Gardens: but on the first night at the Haymarket 'the puppets were goosed off, and the manager made to apologise for the insult offered to the audience.' Nonetheless, some of the songs, including Dibdin's 'Reasonable animals' and 'Pandora', became very popular, and Pandora was later acted at the Circus.

Between 1782 and 1783 he engaged some sixty children to act as dancers and singers for his various lively productions at the Circus, for which he supplied many airs, pantomimes, intermezzi and ballets, under such titles as Clump and Cudden, The benevolent tar, The saloon, The talisman, The graces, Long odds, Tom Thumb, The Passions, The Lancashire witches, The Barrier of Parnassus, The Milkmaid, The Refusal of Harlequin, The Land of Simplicity, The Statue, The regions of Accomplishment, and Cestus (a kind of mythological burlesque in which the Homeric gods discoursed in a low vernacular). His opera Liberty Hall, containing the successful songs "Jock Ratlin", "The Highmettled Racer" and "The Bells of Aberdovey", was produced at the Drury Lane theatre on 8 February 1784.

After three years at the circus, in which Dibdin fell out with his partners and became entangled in litigation; in 1785, he withdrew, and, instead, entered into a speculation to build a theatre at St. Pancras. However, while under construction this was blown down during a storm, and the project had to be abandoned. He then came to an arrangement to supply the manager of the Dublin theatre with music at a cost of £600, of which he received only £140; at the same time he began publishing a weekly magazine, called The Devil, which failed after 21 issues. His last opera of this period was Harvest Home, a two-act comic opera first performed at the Haymarket in 1787.

=== Monodramatic entertainments at King Street and Leicester Place ===
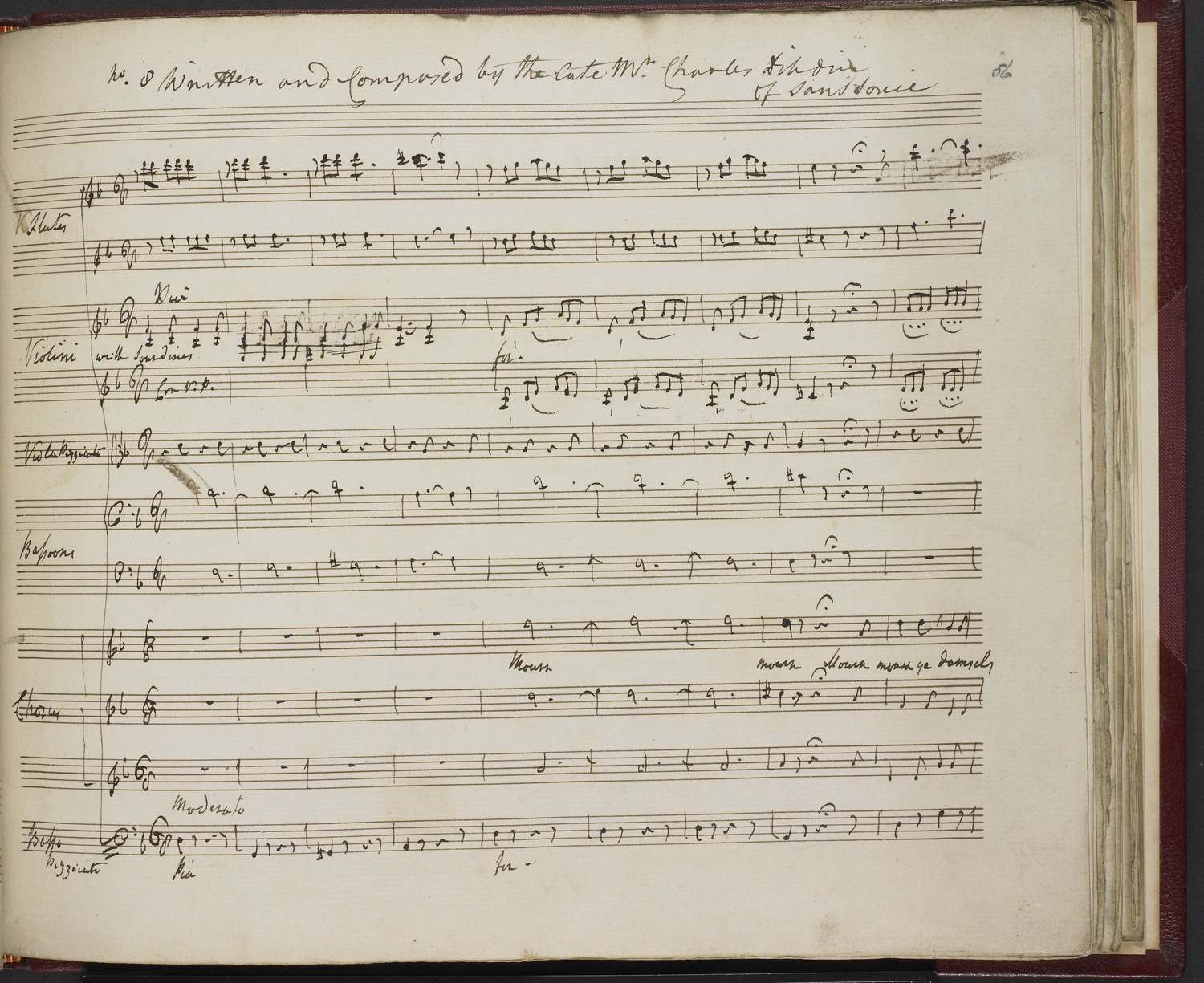
Manuscript in Dibdin's hand of "Mourn Ye Damsels of the Court"

In 1788, having dissolved his connection with the existing theatres and in financial straits, Dibdin considered moving to India. His eldest brother, Captain Thomas Dibdin, had formerly invited him to visit, but had since died, prompting Dibdin to write his greatest song, "Tom Bowling". He now hoped to be received by his brother's old friends, and perhaps to collect certain debts owing to him. Therefore, he made a tour of England to raise money by giving entertainments of songs and recitations, and he sold the musical compositions he had available at very unfavourable rates to the greedy publishers. He set sail for the East Indies in summer 1788, but the vessel was forced to put in at Torbay because of bad weather.

Dibdin then changed his mind and returned to London, resolving to put himself before the public rather than applying again to the theatres. Instead, building on what he had done in his tour, he commenced a new kind of one-man-show, musical variety entertainments, in which he appeared in his own person on the stage seated at a harpsichord and played the accompaniments to his own songs, without attempting any theatrical personification of his characters. The Whim of the Moment was such an entertainment consisting of recitations and songs, and played from October 1788 until the following April, during the whole of which time Dibdin was a prisoner in the King's Bench. This was first given at the Lyceum Theatre in The Strand, and afterwards at Fisher's or Stevens' Auction Room in King Street, in Covent Garden. For several years he also repeated the entertainments in the daytime at the Paul's Head Assembly Rooms in Cateaton Street.

His monodramatic entertainments continued after 1795 at a theatre which he built, the Sans Souci Theatre in Leicester Place. Dibdin introduced very many songs which gained wide popularity, including "Poor Jack," "'Twas in the good ship 'Rover'," "Saturday Night at Sea," and "I sailed from the Downs in the 'Nancy.'" His songs, music and recitations here finally established his fame as a lyric poet. He continued this form of entertainment for nearly twenty years, usually between October and April, in which time he produced eighteen entirely original three-act or three-part productions, as well as several one-act pieces on contemporary themes, or in which to re-introduce some of his popular songs. At Christmas-time or during the spring he commonly cut short the main production to make room for a revival of some items brought out in previous years. Dibdin states that in all these entertainments, he had only the words before him, never having written down the music which was, however, fully composed in his mind.

The three-act novelties of each season, or Entertainments Sans-Souci, and their sequels, were as follows:

- The Whim of the Moment, or, Nature in Little – Auction rooms, King Street, Covent Garden.
- The Oddities (1789) – Lyceum.
- The Wags, or, The Camp of Pleasure (1790) – Lyceum.
- Private Theatricals, or Nature in Nubibus (1791) – Royal Polygraphic Rooms, The Strand; followed by The Coalition, a compilation from the preceding.
- The Quizzes, or, A Trip to Elysium (1792); followed by a compilation from all the preceding.
- Castles in the Air (1793)
- Great News, or, A Trip to the Antipodes (1794) – followed by an Ode in honour of the royal marriage.
- The Will o' the Wisp (1795) – followed by Christmas Gambols
- The General Election (1796) – the first production at Dibdin's new Theatre Sans Souci; followed by Datchet mead, in honour of the marriage of the Princess Royal.
- The Sphinx (1797); followed by a Christmas piece The Goose and the Gridiron.
- The Tour to the Land's End (1798); followed by King and Queen (one act).
- Tom Wilkins (1799).
- The Cake-house (1800).
- A Frisk (1801).
- Most Votes (1802).
- Britons, Strike Home (1803). This included a series of war-songs with military-band accompaniments.
- In 1804 there was a one-act novelty Valentine's Day, and three compilations of older pieces, namely The Election (from Most Votes); The Frolic (from Britons, Strike Home); and, A trip to the Coast.
- Heads and Tails (1805); followed by Cecilia, or the Progress of Industry.
- Professional Volunteers (1808). (Given at the Lyceum during Lent, supported by professional assistants, though still, after 48 years before the public, playing his own accompaniments).
- The Rent-day, or, The Yeoman's Friend (1808) – Sans-Pareil Theatre (later the Adelphi Theatre) in the Strand.
- Commodore Pennant (1809) – the last of these entertainments, a slight piece, was given in a room in the author's shop in the Strand.

John Adolphus, writing of Dibdin's involvement in the entertainment Bannister's Budget, wrote: "Charles Dibdin, year after year... had been giving delight and, for a time, acquiring great emolument, by means of entertainments under different names, in which he not only pleased but instructed the public; advancing the cause of morals by natural and energetic sentiments, and raising the flame of patriotism and loyalty by songs and speeches, just in conception and illustration, and impressive on the memory and the judgement by vivid imagery and pointed expression. His sea-songs form a class by themselves: they are calculated alike to cheer solitude and to animate social assemblages, to raise the laugh and the tear, and to engrave on the heart benevolence, courage, and a trust in Providence." Charles's son Thomas Dibdin, a close associate of John Bannister, wrote that "Charles Bannister, and his exemplary son John, were two of [Dibdin's] most intimate friends."

=== Impressions of Dibdin ===
The author of his memoir, who witnessed one of Dibdin's Entertainments Sans Souci when a lad, offers the following picture:

Dibdin was then a handsome man, of middle size, with an open pleasing countenance, and a very gentlemanlike appearance and address. His costume was a blue coat, white waistcoat, and black silk breeches and stockings; and he wore his hair, in the fashion of the day, fully dressed and profusely powdered. His manner of speaking was easy and colloquial; and his air was more that of a person entertaining a party of friends in a private drawing-room, than of a performer exhibiting to a public audience. He was near-sighted; and, when seated at his instrument, he would bend his head close to his book for a few moments, and then, laying it down, throw himself back in his chair, and deliver his song without further reference to book or music. His voice was a baryton (a medium between the tenor and the bass) of no great power or compass, but of a sweet and mellow quality. He sang with simplicity, without any attempt at ambitious ornament, but with a great deal of taste and expression; and, being a poet as well as a musician, he was particularly attentive to a clear and emphatic utterance of the words ... In singing, he accompanied himself with facility and neatness, on an instrument of a peculiar kind, combining the properties of the pianoforte and the chamber organ, and so constructed that the performer could produce the tones of either instrument separately, or of both in combination. To this instrument were attached a set of bells, a side drum, a tambourine, and a gong, which he could bring into play by various mechanical contrivances, so as to give a pleasing variety to his accompaniments.

— Hogarth (Ed.), Songs of Charles Dibdin (1848), Vol. 1, p. xxv

His manner of coming upon the stage was in a happy style; he ran on sprightly and with nearly a laughing face, like a friend who enters hastily to impart to you some good news.

— John O'Keeffe, 'Recollections of the Life of John O'Keeffe', The New Monthly Magazine

=== War songs and later years ===
Dibdin's patriotic sea songs and their melodious refrains powerfully influenced the national spirit and were officially appropriated to the use of the British navy during the war with France. They were not shanties or working songs, but a form of distinctively English ballad combining the tonality of the hornpipe with vivid if sentimentalized depictions of the comradeship, the separations from love, the simple patriotism, loyalty and manly courage of Tom, England's Jack Tar. In 1803 he was induced by Pitt's government, with a pension of £200 a year (equivalent to £17,800 in 2025), to abandon provincial engagements to compose and sing 'War Songs' to keep up the ferment of popular feeling against France. This was withdrawn for a time under the administration of Lord Grenville, but afterwards partly restored.

Dibdin still provided texts for operas, including The Cabinet, which was presented at Covent Garden in February 1803 with John Braham, Nancy Storace and Charles Incledon, and in December The British Fleet in 1342. At least two further operas appeared: Broken Gold was a farce in two acts on the occasion of Lord Nelson's victory and death, produced at Drury Lane with John Bannister in 1806, which was 'damned on the first night, and never published'. His last production, The Round Robin, was first acted at the Haymarket in June 1811. This incorporated his highly successful song 'The standing toast,' which had been written some time before.

During this period, in 1805, he sold Sans Souci and opened a music shop in the Strand (opposite the Lyceum), but the venture was a failure and he was declared bankrupt. He retired from public life in 1805, disposing of his stock (including the copyright of 360 songs) to a firm in Oxford Street for £1,800, with £100 a year for the next three years in consideration of whatever songs he might write. He took up residence in Arlington Road in Camden Town, where he suffered a paralytic stroke in 1813 after which the government granted him a pension of £200. In 1810 a subscription dinner and concert was held for his benefit. This raised £640, of which £560 was invested in long annuities for himself and his family. He died on 25 July 1814 in comparative poverty, and was buried in St Martin's churchyard there. His widow placed a stone over his grave inscribed with a quatrain from "Tom Bowling".

=== Other writings ===
Besides his Musical Tour through England (1788), his Professional Life, an autobiography published in 4 volumes in 1803, a Complete History of the British Stage (5 vols, 1795), Observations on a Tour through England and Scotland (2 vols, 1803) and several smaller works, he wrote upwards of 1400 songs and about thirty dramatic pieces. He also wrote the following novels: The Devil (2 vols, 1785); Hannah Hewitt (3 vols, 1792); The Younger Brother (3 vols, 1793) and Henry Hooka (3 vols, 1806). An edition of his songs by G. Hogarth (1843) contains a memoir of his life.

== Allusions in music and literature ==
The tune of "Tom Bowling" forms part of Sir Henry Wood's 1905 Fantasia on British Sea Songs customarily played on the Last Night of the Proms. Verdant Green, eponymous hero of the novel by Cuthbert Bede, learns to row and 'feathers his oars with skill and dexterity' (Part II Chapter VI), borrowing a line from Dibdin's song "The Jolly Young Waterman". The great Victorian baritone Sir Charles Santley made his farewell performance at Covent Garden in 1911 in the role of Tom Tug in Dibdin's opera The Waterman. And in James Joyce's story "Eveline" (from Dubliners), Frank 'sang about the lass that loves a sailor' from the song of the same name (also called 'The standing toast') by Dibdin.

Just before his marriage, James Boswell wrote a song, "A Matrimonial Thought" which was given a tune "by the very ingenious Mr. Dibden."

In the blithe days of honey-moon,
With Kathe's allurements smitten,
I lov'd her late, I lov'd her soon
And I called her dearest kitten.
But now my kitten's grown a cat,
And cross like other wives,
O! by my soul, my honest Mat,
I fear she has nine lives.

== Family ==
Dibdin had married early in life, but deserted his first wife and left her destitute. He then formed an illicit connection with Harriett Pitt (stage name Mrs. Davenet), a chorus-singer at Covent Garden Theatre, and had some children by her. In time he deserted Harriet in favour of Ann Wyld, with whom he remained and had several further children during his wife's lifetime, and finally married Wyld in 1798 after his first wife died. She and only one daughter of that union survived him.

Dibdin's two sons with Harriet − Charles and Thomas John Dibdin, whose works are often confused with those of their father − were also popular dramatists in their day. Through his son Thomas, Dibdin was an ancestor of the British politician Michael Heseltine.

He was also the uncle of the bibliographer Thomas Frognall Dibdin.

== Public memorials ==
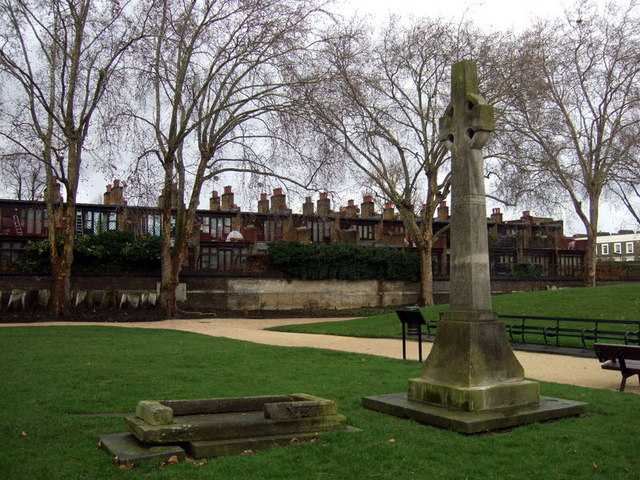
Celtic cross memorial to Dibdin, erected by public subscription in 1889, after his original tomb collapsed, in St Martin's Gardens, Camden Town

Seven years after his death a subscription to raise a monument to Dibdin was set in train under the patronage of the Duke of Clarence and Admiral Sir George York. At a public dinner and concert a large sum was raised, but insufficient to complete the project. A second grand musical entertainment, The Feast of Neptune, raised a further £400 and the monument was eventually raised in the Veterans' Library at the Royal Hospital, Greenwich, which is now the Peacock Room, part of the Trinity Laban Conservatoire of Music and Dance.

British politician Michael Heseltine is a distant descendant of Dibdin, having 'Dibdin' as one of his middle names. He is a fan of Dibdin's works, and was responsible for the government's erection of a statue of Dibdin in Greenwich.

On the west face of the tower of Holyrood Church in Southampton is a memorial plaque to Dibdin, where he is described as a "native of Southampton, poet, dramatist and composer, author of Tom Bowling, Poor Jack and other sea songs".

In 1889 a Celtic cross memorial was erected, by public subscription, in St Martin's Gardens, Camden Town, after his original tomb collapsed. A verse from "Tom Bowling" is inscribed upon it:

His form was of the manliest beauty,
His heart was kind and soft,
Faithful, below, he did his duty;
But now he's gone aloft.

Also in Camden, in Joseph Grimaldi Park a grave-style musical memorial for Dibdin is placed next to one for Joseph Grimaldi.

== Recordings ==
Three recent discs of Dibdin's music have been recorded and released by Retrospect Opera. The first, which appeared in 2017, comprises Christmas Gambols and The Musical Tour of Mr Dibdin. The second, released in 2019, includes Dibdin's The Jubilee, Queen Mab and Datchet Mead. The third, "The Wags", was released in late 2021. All feature the singer Simon Butteriss and the keyboardist Stephen Higgins. The Jubilee also features the singers Soraya Mafi, Robert Murray and Heather Shipp.

A previous disc featuring Dibdin's The Ephesian Matron, The Brickdust Man and The Grenadier, conducted by Peter Holman, was released on the Hyperion label in 1992. There have also been many recordings of Dibdin's most famous song, Tom Bowling.
