= Carrog, Anglesey =

Village in Anglesey, Wales

Coordinates: 53°23′58″N 4°26′41″W

Carrog
- Location within Anglesey
- OS grid reference: SH 3755 9197
  - Cardiff: 142 mi (229 km)
  - London: 223 mi (359 km)
- Community: Llanbadrig
- Principal area: Anglesey
- Preserved county: Gwynedd
- Country: Wales
- Sovereign state: United Kingdom
- Post town: Rhosgoch
- Police: North Wales
- Fire: North Wales
- Ambulance: Welsh
- UK Parliament: Ynys Môn
- Senedd Cymru – Welsh Parliament: Ynys Môn

Carrog is a village in the community of Llanbadrig, Anglesey, Wales. Recent excavations of a circular hill-top enclosure show that people have inhabited this area since at least the Late Bronze Age or even the Early Iron Age.

== See also ==
- List of localities in Wales by population
