= Marcus Vergette =

Sculptor and musician (born 1961)

Marcus Vergette MRSS (born 1961) is a sculptor based in the UK, much of whose recent work involves bells. He is also a double bass player and composer.

== Early life and education ==
Vergette was born in Carbondale, Illinois. He studied at Portsmouth School of Art, Southern Illinois University and Central School of Art, London (1981-1983).

== Time and Tide Bells ==
Vergette's Time and Tide Bells project comprises bells which are hung on the UK coast and are rung by the action of the sea at high tide. The first was installed at Appledore, Devon in 2009, the sixth at Morecambe, Lancashire in 2019, and as of 2019 further installations are planned.

== Other works ==
Vergette's first bell was created as a community project in his local village of Highampton, where he has a small farm, to celebrate the ending of the Foot and Mouth Disease epidemic of 2001, and to commemorate the animals slaughtered.

His Listening Bell (2006) is on the campus of the University of Leicester and his Harmonic Cannon or Canon(2017) stands in the courtyard of Trinity Laban in Greenwich.

In February 2025, Vergette was the subject of a BBC Radio 4 programme "Bellboy" in the series Illuminated.
