= Stigliano, Sovicille =

Stigliano
- Frazione
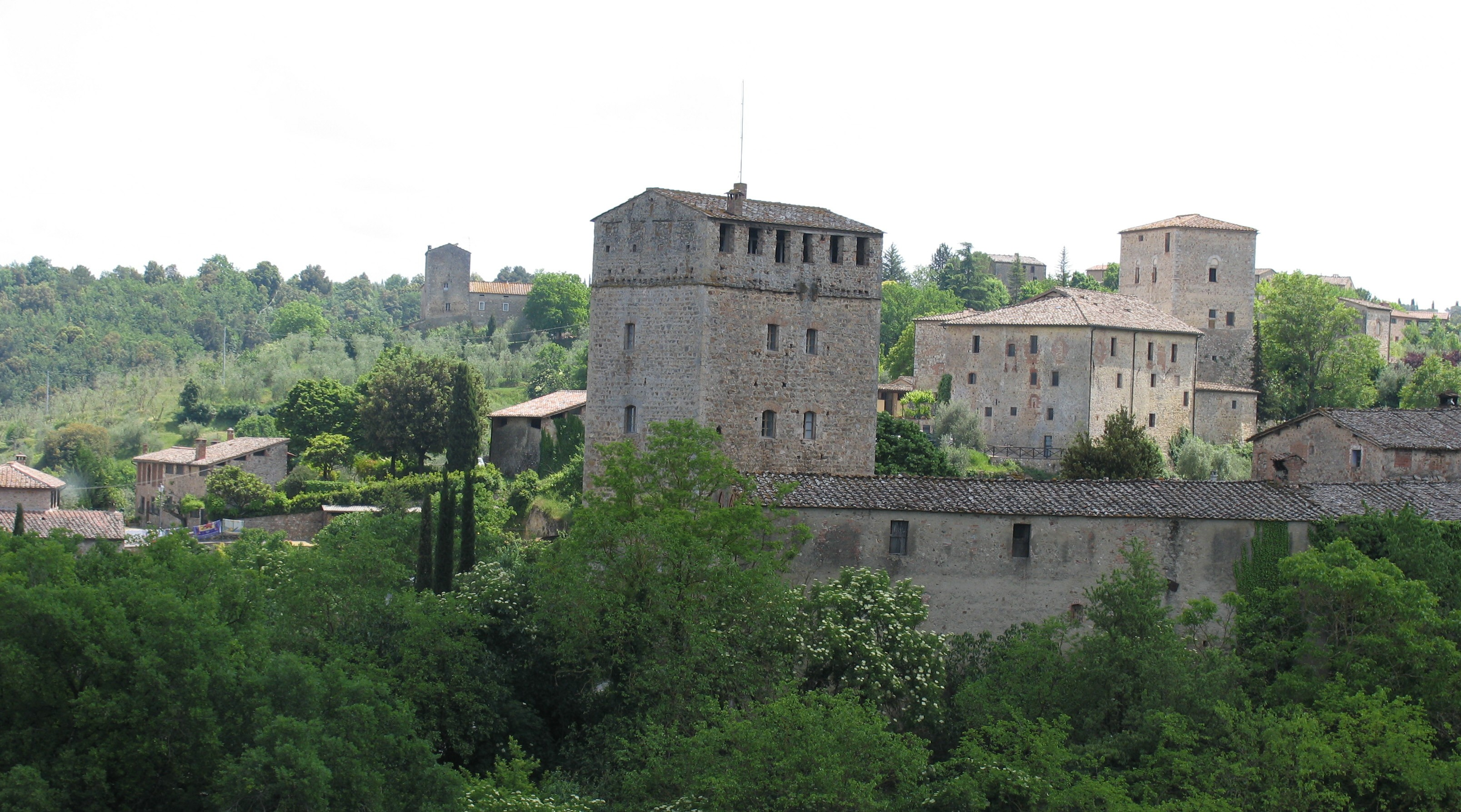
- View of Stigliano

- Location within Italy
- Coordinates: 43°13′26″N 11°13′44″E
- Country: Italy
- Region: Tuscany
- Province: Siena (SI)
- Comune: Sovicille
- Elevation: 250 m (820 ft)

Population (2011)
  - Total: 57
- Postal code: 53018
- Dialing code: 0577

Stigliano is a village in Tuscany, Italy, a frazione (subdivision) of the comune of Sovicille, in the province of Siena.

== History ==
=== Ancient era ===
As showed by excavations of the ruins of castellieri (walls protecting ancient settlements) on the Sienavecchia height, the origins of Stigliano date to Iron Age times. Scholars have suggested that these structures could have been built by the Etruscans as a defence against the invasion of the Senones. The presence of the latter is confirmed by local toponyms such as the name of the village Brenna, close to Stigliano, which could stem from the name of their leader Brennus. The name of the local Merse river, which flows behind Stigliano, is potentially directly related to Merseburg, a town in eastern Germany. Orgia and Rosia are both non-Roman names, possibly related to the Lombard period.

Although very little is known of Stigliano during Roman times, the name Sextilianum, which appears in later records, may show the existence of a private property later on giving the name to the village.

=== Middle Ages ===
Stigliano is the site of one of the many castles that were part of the Ardenghesca consortium, feudal lords of Lombard ancestry.

In the Middle Ages Stigliano was the hub of a network of roads crossing the region, one to Massa Marittima and another following the Rosia river to the Maremma area. All routes passed through the villages of Torri and Stigliano; traces of the old roads can be seen in the woods near Stigliano.

The presence of a monastery at Torri triggered economic growth in the area. The monks carried out an agricultural and industrial revolution, draining the marshes and introducing water mills along the Merse. The river accommodated every sort of hydraulic machinery, but mainly the ones, as forges, related to siderurgy.

The abundance of water and wood, so acutely missed by the Siena merchants, influenced the development of Stigliano and the neighbouring villages during the 13th century. These natural resources were of crucial importance for Siena, the major city in the area, who decided finally to take the Ardenghesche lands for its own purposes. The first established industry was that of the Wool Masters, “the Follatura”, who signed a contract with the monks at Torri to develop hydraulic machinery along the Merse river. Later on, the river was diverted to power a series of huge flour mills, built by the Sienese Commune, of which three are still standing: Molino del Pero, near Brenna, Molino Serravalle and Molino del Palazzo. The straight track which goes to San Rocco a Pilli was also built at this time. Some other mills, “Sassa” and “Volta”, are just ruins. These mills were indispensable for the production of flour to supply Siena. Their intricate hydraulic system stretched for kilometres and was one of the most important technical achievements of the Middle Ages in Tuscany.

A careful inventory of land properties in 1320, carried out by the Siena authorities for tax purposes, reveals the main source of incomes from this area in middle age: the iron industry. Although still primitive, siderurgy was greatly improved by hydraulic machinery, and reached high levels of sophistication. During this era, Stigliano was an independent commune, owning large areas of woodland and granting permits for allotments to its inhabitants, not only to farmers but also to commercial entrepreneurs and merchants. There are documents recording land exchanges with the Sienese as far back as the 13th century. However, after the outbreak of the Black Death in 1348 and the subsequent decline of the population, these achievements were neglected and even the revival of agriculture in the 18th century could not compare with the thriving centre in medieval times. The plague and the subsequent appearance of the ruthless condottieri armies, which plundered the countryside, ruined the synergy between the commune and its lands. Stigliano underwent a stage of refeudalization, and large properties of land were assembled by former merchants and bankers: the Borghese family, who established their master manor in the form of a stronghold at Palazzo, and the Pecci family, who built their own in Poggiarello, the castello del Poggiarello di Stigliano. Further on, a farm belonging to the Sienese hospital Santa Maria della Scala was sold to the Placidi family and became an estate called Poderina (rebuilt in neogothic style in the 19th century). Another Renaissance villa, once owned by the Venturi-Gallerani family, later neglected and transformed into a farmhouse, is in Piaggia.
