= Tonni =

Tonni may refer to:

- Tonni (name)
- Tonni, Sovicille, Siena, Italy

== See also ==
- Tonna (disambiguation)
- Tonti (disambiguation)
