= Guidoccio Cozzarelli =

Italian painter and miniaturist

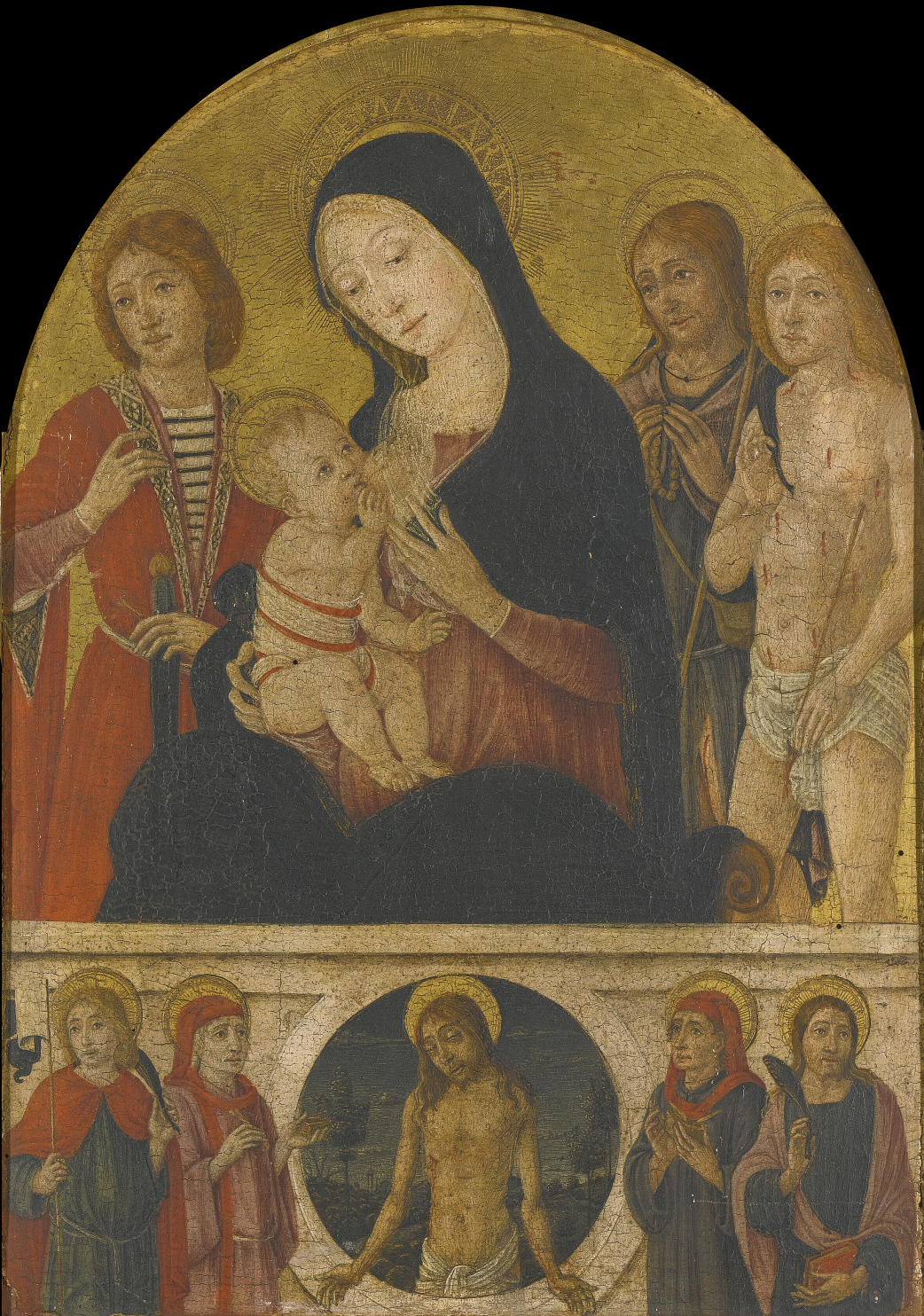
The Madonna and Child with Saints Julian the Hospitaller, Roch and Sebastian by Guidoccio Cozzarelli, triptych panel including below Christ set in a landscape, flanked by Saints Cosmas and Damian and two other male saints, private collection, 1516

Guidoccio Cozzarelli (1450–1517) was an Italian Renaissance painter and miniaturist.

Cozzarelli was born in Siena, and was a student and collaborator of Matteo di Giovanni, with whom it is sometimes possible to confuse him due to their similar styles, and has led to some difficulty in painting attributions. Compared to Matteo, Cozzarelli's style is less fine, but more adept in chiaroscuro and color scheme. Cozzarelli primarily painted religious-themed works for church commissions, and became more popular as a miniaturist and painter, which includes the parchment preserved in the state in Siena, and the thumbnails stored in Siena Cathedral (1480s). This is considered his most fertile period in which Cozzarelli produced the Baptism of Christ and the Madonna and Saints (1486) in the church of San Bernardino in Sinalunga. He also painted Madonna Enthroned with St Jerome and the Blessed Colombini (1482). In the following years he worked for the Duomo di Pitigliano, the parish church of Ancaiano (1491) and the church of San Michele Arcangelo in Paganico, including Madonna and Child Enthroned with Saints. In the Pinacoteca Nazionale (Siena) are exhibited various works of the painter, including San Antonio, and Santa Caterina surrounded by Doctors and Pharmacists.
