= Tontine (disambiguation) =

A tontine is an investment plan for raising capital, devised in the 17th century.

Tontine may also refer to:

- Tontine Building, in Vermont, USA
- Tontine Buildings, Stourport, in Worcestershire, England
- Tontine (card game), an historical French gambling and card game
- Tontine (horse), a 19th century British racehorse
- Tontine Coffee House
- Tontine Group, Australian pillow manufacturer
- Tontine Park, former football ground in Scotland

== See also ==
- Tonti (disambiguation)
