= Tonna =

Tonna may refer to:

- Tonna, Neath, a village in Wales, part of the county borough Neath Port Talbot
  - Tonna RFC, a rugby union team from Tonna
- Tonna (gastropod), a genus of marine snails
- Tonna, Germany, a municipality in Thuringia, Germany
- Tonna (Unstrut), a stream of Thuringia, Germany
- An alternative spelling for the Japanese poet Ton'a
- Tonna, Antenna, a French antenna manufacturer, renowned manufacturer of Amateur radio antennas

== People with that name ==
- Alfred Tonna (born 1950), Maltese former cyclist
- Charlotte Elizabeth Tonna (1790–1846), popular Victorian English writer and novelist who wrote as Charlotte Elizabeth
- Eivind Tonna (born 1975), Norwegian ski-orienteering competitor
- Lewis Hippolytus Joseph Tonna (1812–1857), English polyglot and campaigner on behalf of evangelical protestantism

== See also ==
- Tonda (disambiguation)
- Tonja (name)
- Tonina (disambiguation)
- Tonka (disambiguation)
- Tonni (name)
- Tonny (disambiguation)
