= Tonni (name) =

Tonni or Tónni is a given name and a surname.

- Tania Rahman Tonni, Bangladeshi model
- Tonni Hansen (born 1958), Danish politician

== See also ==
- Toni
- Tonin (name)
- Tonna (disambiguation)
- Tonne (name)
- Tonni (disambiguation)
- Tonnie
- Tonnis
- Tonny (name)
- Tonti (disambiguation)
