= Toiano, Sovicille =

Toiano
- Frazione
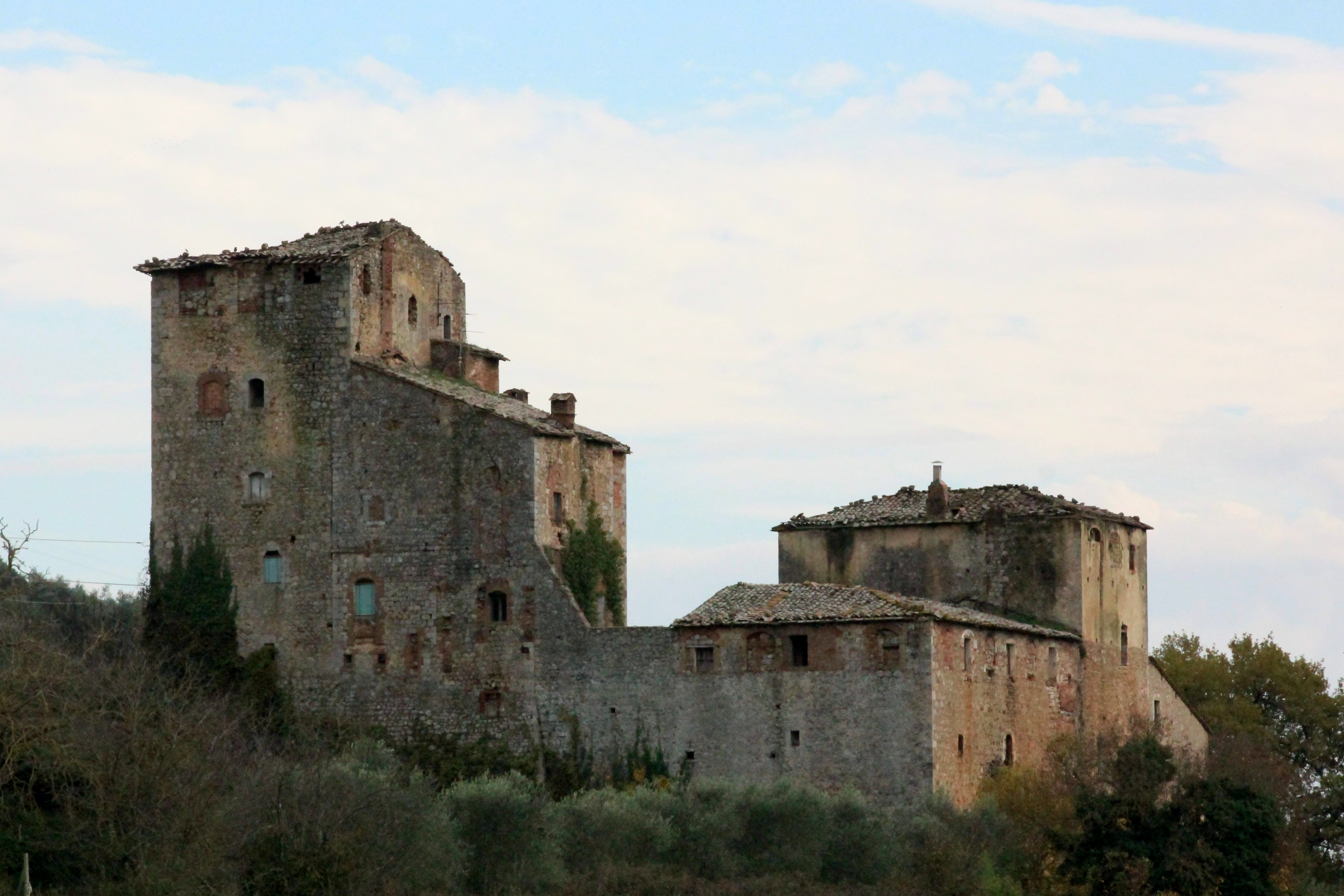
- The castle of Palazzaccio di Toiano

- Location of Toiano in Italy
- Coordinates: 43°17′48″N 11°14′46″E
- Country: Italy
- Region: Tuscany
- Province: Siena (SI)
- Comune: Sovicille
- Elevation: 229 m (751 ft)

Population (2011)
  - Total: 39
- Time zone: UTC+1 (CET)
  - Summer (DST): UTC+2 (CEST)

Toiano is a village in Tuscany, central Italy, in the comune of Sovicille, province of Siena. At the time of the 2001 census its population was 27.

Toiano is about 11 km from Siena and 3 km from Sovicille.
