= Carpineto, Sovicille =

Carpineto
- Frazione
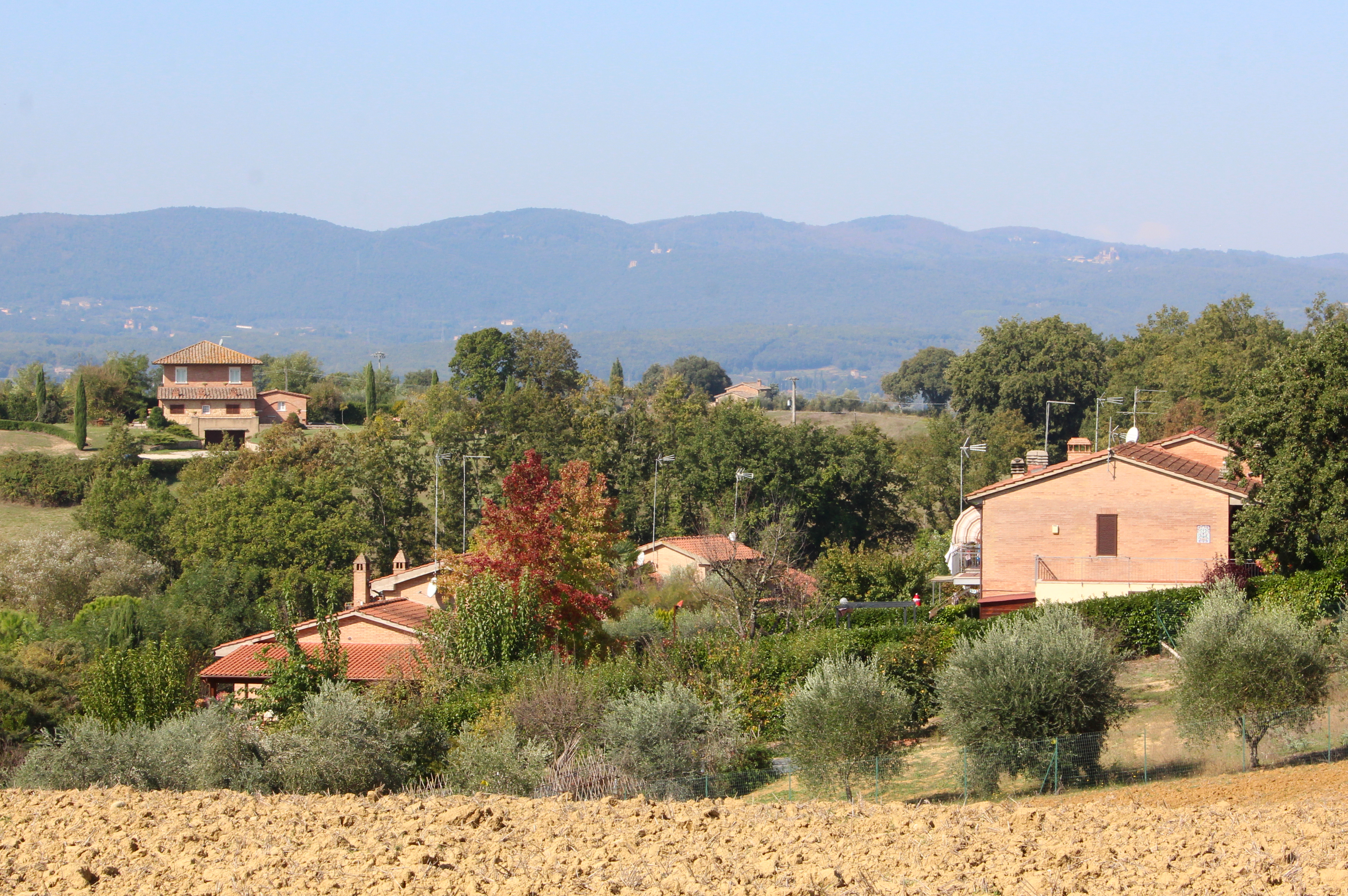
- View of Carpineto

- Location of Carpineto in Italy
- Coordinates: 43°16′34″N 11°17′16″E
- Country: Italy
- Region: Tuscany
- Province: Siena (SI)
- Comune: Sovicille
- Elevation: 250 m (820 ft)

Population (2011)
  - Total: 328
- Time zone: UTC+1 (CET)
  - Summer (DST): UTC+2 (CEST)

Carpineto is a village in Tuscany, central Italy, in the comune of Sovicille, province of Siena. At the time of the 2001 census its population was 349.

Carpineto is about 9 km from Siena and 8 km from Sovicille.
