= Ampugnano =

- Frazione
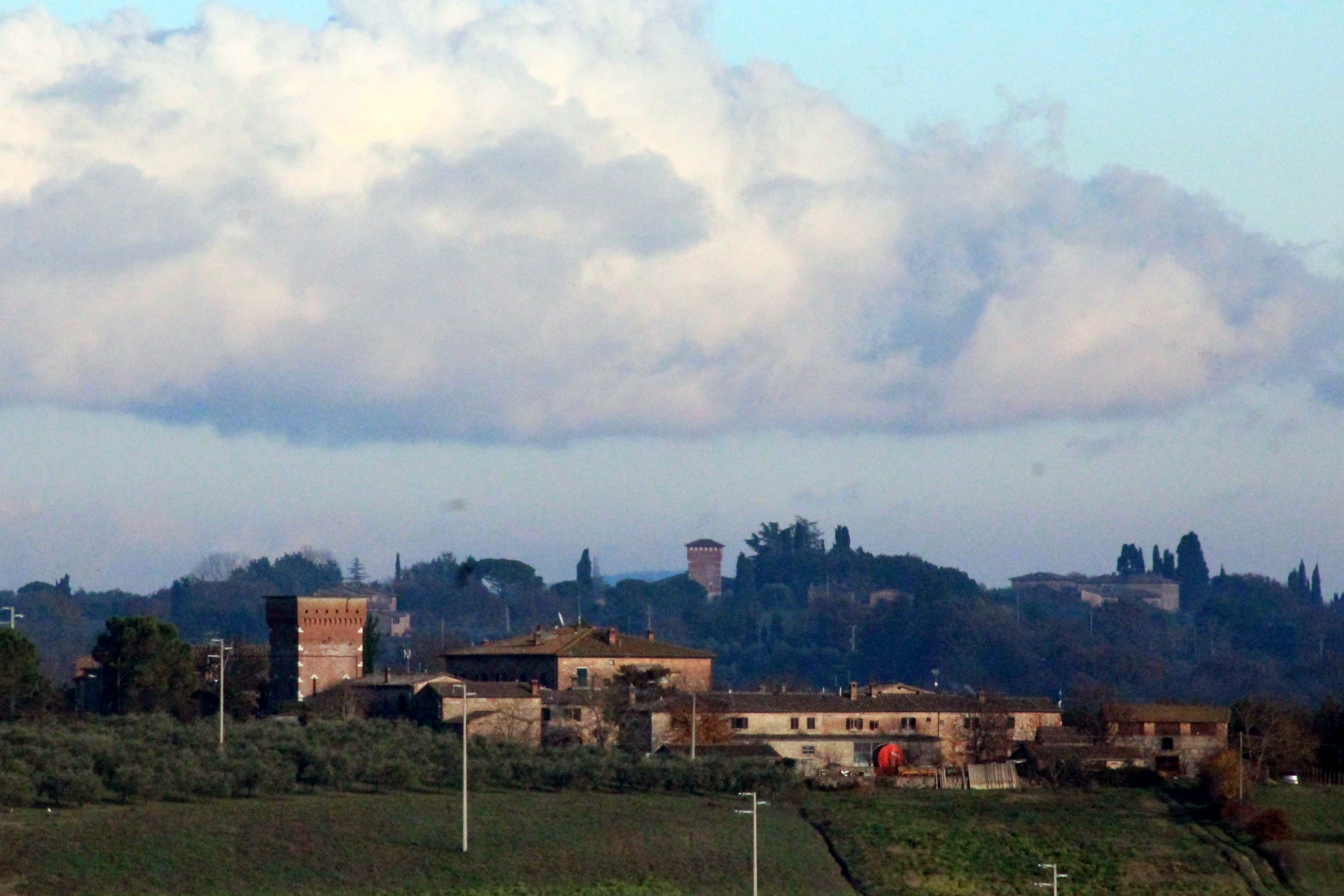
- View of Ampugnano

- Location of Ampugnano in Italy
- Coordinates: 43°16′10″N 11°15′12″E
- Country: Italy
- Region: Tuscany
- Province: Siena (SI)
- Comune: Sovicille
- Elevation: 227 m (745 ft)

Population (2011)
  - Total: 164
- Time zone: UTC+1 (CET)
  - Summer (DST): UTC+2 (CEST)

Ampugnano is a village in Tuscany, central Italy, located in the comune of Sovicille, province of Siena. At the time of the 2001 census its population was 133.

Ampugnano is about 11 km from Siena and 3 km from Sovicille. The Siena–Ampugnano Airport is located next to the village.
