= San Giusto a Balli =

- Frazione
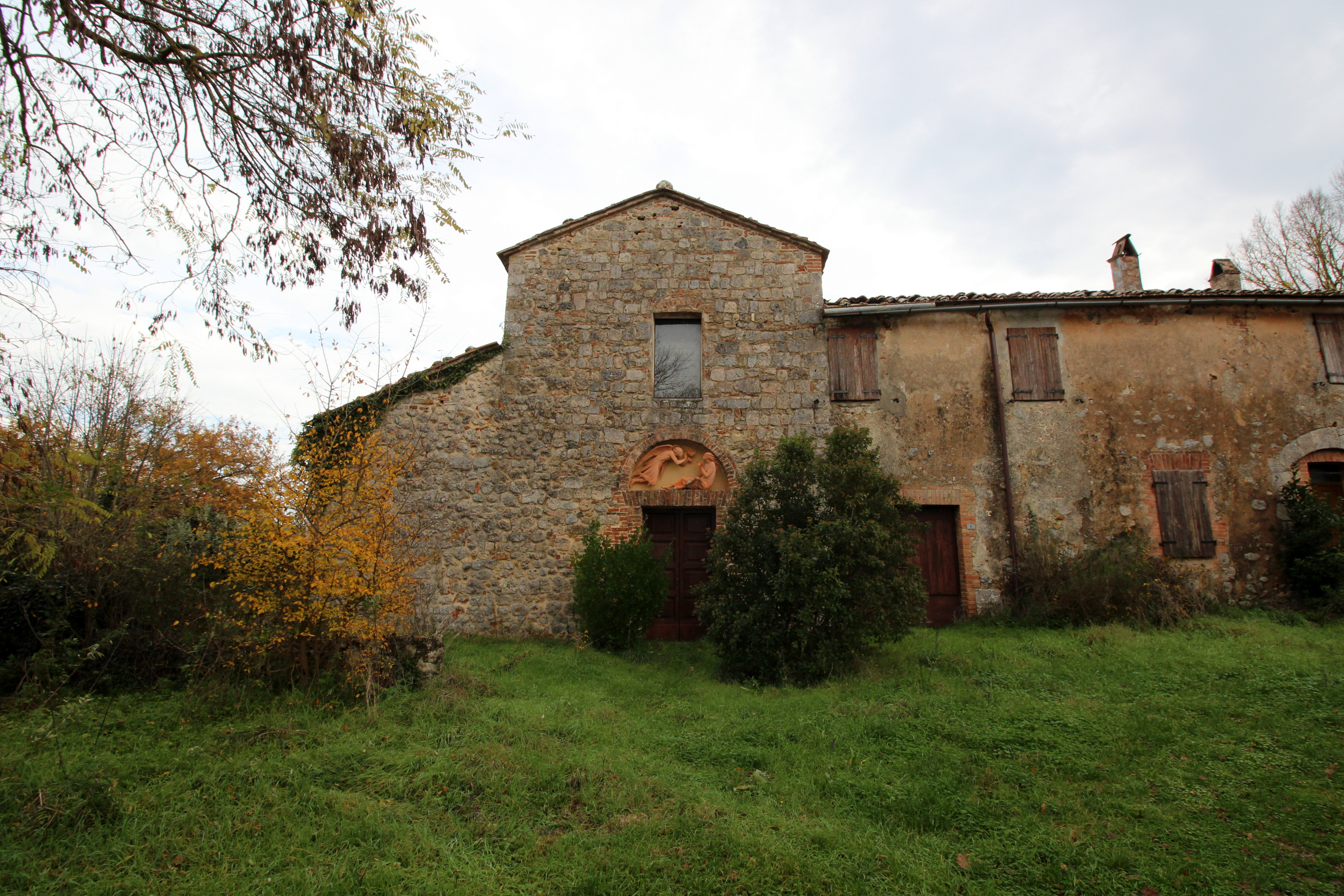
- The former pieve in San Giusto a Balli

- Location of San Giusto a Balli in Italy
- Coordinates: 43°17′17″N 11°13′55″E
- Country: Italy
- Region: Tuscany
- Province: Siena (SI)
- Comune: Sovicille
- Elevation: 221 m (725 ft)

Population (2011)
  - Total: 32
- Time zone: UTC+1 (CET)
  - Summer (DST): UTC+2 (CEST)

San Giusto a Balli is a village in Tuscany, central Italy, in the comune of Sovicille, province of Siena. At the time of the 2001 census its population was 27.

San Giusto a Balli is about 11 km from Siena and 2 km from Sovicille.
