= Simignano =

- Frazione
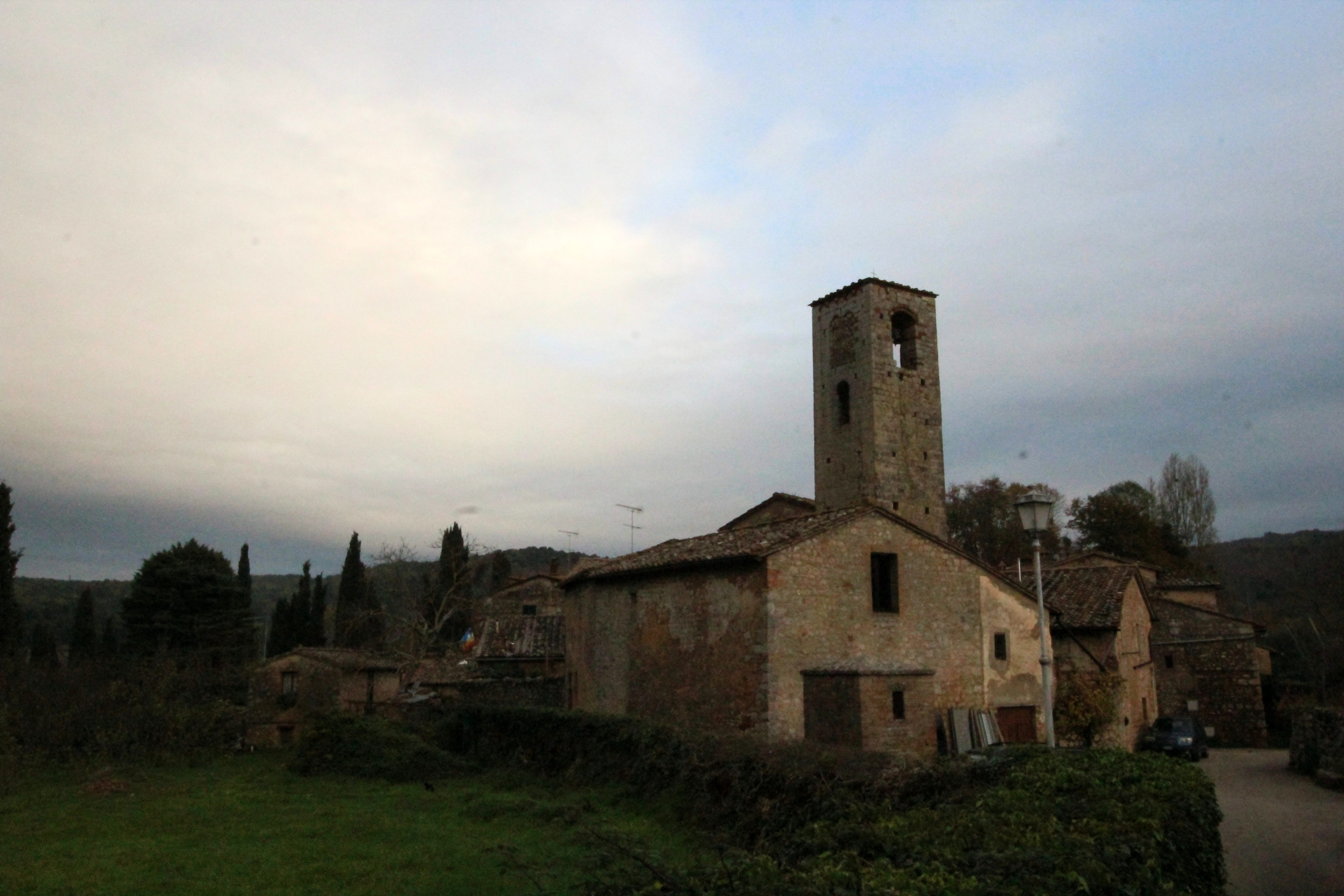

- Location of Simignano in Italy
- Coordinates: 43°17′32″N 11°10′1″E
- Country: Italy
- Region: Tuscany
- Province: Siena (SI)
- Comune: Sovicille
- Elevation: 418 m (1,371 ft)

Population (2011)
  - Total: 30
- Time zone: UTC+1 (CET)
  - Summer (DST): UTC+2 (CEST)

Simignano is a village in Tuscany, central Italy, in the comune of Sovicille, province of Siena. At the time of the 2001 census its population was 35.

Simignano is about 20 km from Siena and 10 km from Sovicille.
