= Torri, Sovicille =

Torri
- Frazione
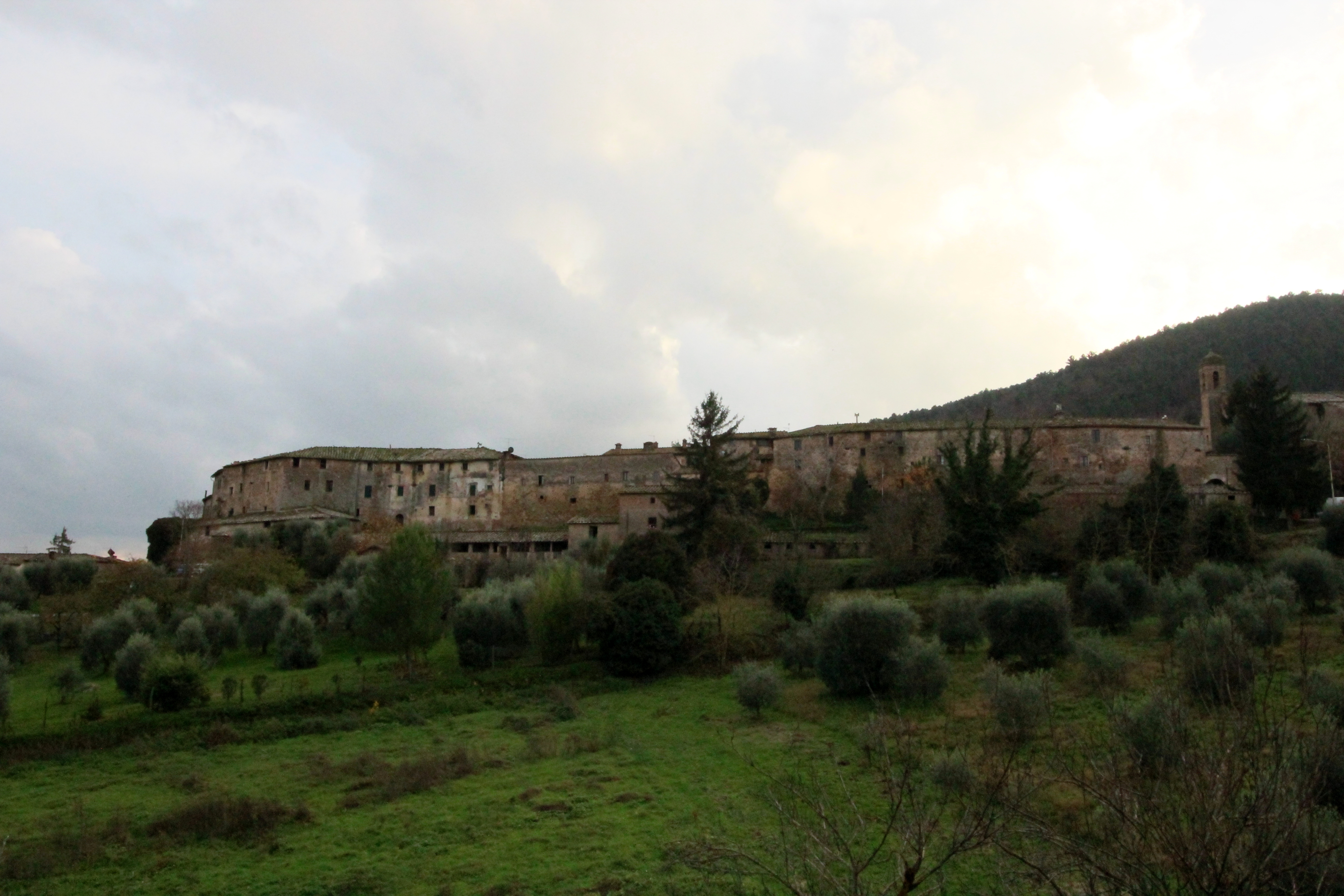
- View of Torri

- Location of Torri in Italy
- Coordinates: 43°13′59″N 11°13′19″E
- Country: Italy
- Region: Tuscany
- Province: Siena (SI)
- Comune: Sovicille
- Elevation: 253 m (830 ft)

Population (2011)
  - Total: 72
- Demonym: Torriani
- Time zone: UTC+1 (CET)
  - Summer (DST): UTC+2 (CEST)

Torri is a village in Tuscany, central Italy, administratively a frazione of the comune of Sovicille, province of Siena. At the time of the 2001 census its population was 62.
