= Giacinto Achilli =

Italian Roman Catholic priest who became a Protestant evangelical

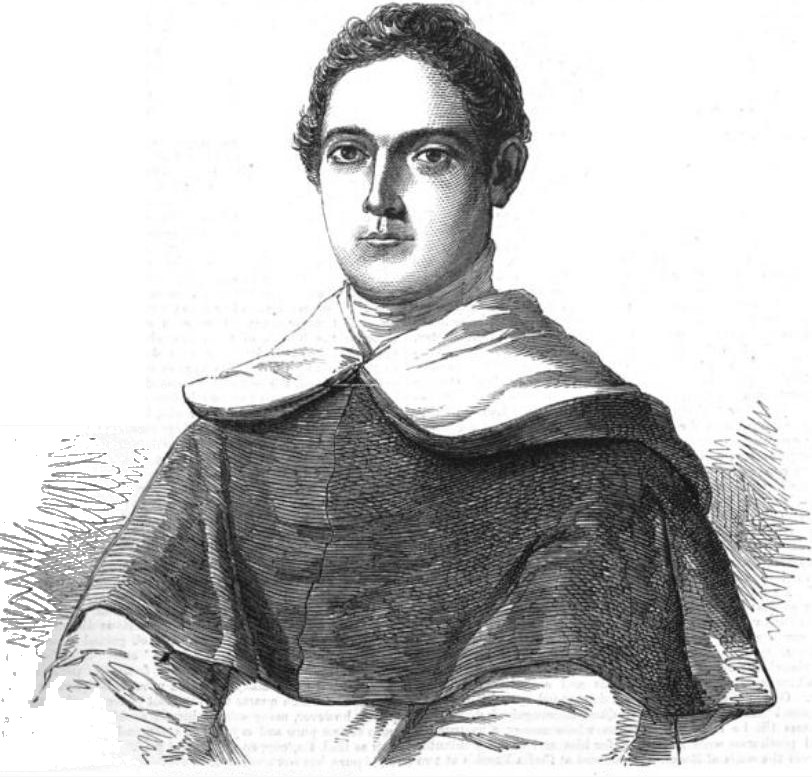
- Giacinto Achilli (c. 1852)
- Born: Giovanni Giacinto Achilli; 1803; Celleno, Papal States
- Disappeared: 1860 (aged 56–57)
- Occupation: Dominican friar
- Known for: Accused of child sexual abuse

Giovanni Giacinto Achilli (Italian pronunciation: [dʒoˈvanni dʒaˈtʃinto aˈkilli]; c. 1803 – c. 1860) was an Italian Roman Catholic Dominican friar and anti-Jesuit who was discharged from priesthood and imprisoned by the Roman Inquisition after being accused of child sexual abuse or for doctrinal heresy. Achilli escaped and subsequently became an evangelist for the Anglican Communion. He is noted for his activities in England, and victory in a legal case against John Henry Newman, who had made accusations about Achilli's past, for libel.

== Early life as a priest ==
Achilli was born in Celleno, a village c. 30 km from Viterbo, then part of the Papal States. He joined the Dominican order in 1819 and was ordained a priest in 1825.

In 1833 Achilli obtained the degree of Master of Sacred Theology at the Roman College of St. Thomas, the future Pontifical University of Saint Thomas Aquinas, The Angelicum.

In 1840, for being against the abuses of the Roman Inquisition, Achilli underwent a sequence of disciplinary actions and sanctions, largely arising from allegations by his pro-Inquisition opponents of sexual misconduct including the alleged rape of a 15-year-old girl in Naples.

On 16 June 1841, the Roman Inquisition finally lost patience and permanently suspended Achilli from the cure of souls, sentencing him to three years' penance at a remote monastery at San Nazzaro. However, in 1842, Achilli made his way to Corfu, then a British protectorate, and claimed political asylum alleging that he was a cavaliere and that he had escaped from the fortress at Ancona. The local authorities were minded to grant the papal consul's request for extradition until they discovered that Achilli was claiming to have converted to Protestantism and was engaged in fervent anti-Catholic propaganda, largely under the influence of Isaac Lowndes, the Scottish Presbyterian secretary of the Bible Society. He also made alliances with exiled Italian nationalists.

== Malta and England ==
After establishing himself in Malta in 1846, opening an Italian Protestant church, in May 1847 he travelled to London. There, the committee of the Protestant College of St Julian's, Malta, appointed him professor with a special mission to spread Protestantism in Italy. However, during his absence from Malta, two of his fellow Protestant preachers were accused of "fornication" and it was further alleged that Achilli had encouraged them in their misconduct. Achilli returned to Malta in December but was dismissed by the London committee, along with his fellow accused, in May 1848.

However, he returned to London in June, where he still enjoyed important supporters including Sir Culling Eardley Eardley, chairman of the Evangelical Alliance.

== Risorgimento ==
Following the revolutions of 1848 in the Italian states, Rome was in the hands of Italian nationalists who established the Roman Republic in February 1849. Achilli travelled there in early 1849 and continued his Protestant, anti-Catholic and pro-nationalist propaganda. On 24 June 1849 he married Josephine Hely, the youngest daughter of Captain James Hely, whose family he had befriended when in England.

The Roman Republic fell in June 1849 when the French took the city and reinstated Pope Pius IX's political authority. Though French president Louis Napoleon had requested that the Pope grant an amnesty, Achilli was arrested by the Cardinal Vicar and imprisoned by the Inquisition, in the Castel Sant'Angelo, for preaching against the Catholic religion and taking part in revolutionary agitation. There Augustin Theiner attempted to reconvert him to Catholicism, to no avail. Lewis Tonna and other London evangelicals canvassed the French government in October 1849 and succeeding in effecting Achilli's release.

== England and controversy ==
Achilli's evangelical supporters brought him to England and established him in an Italian chapel under the aegis of the Evangelical Alliance. A series of antagonistic pamphlets established itself between Eardley and prominent English Catholic Cardinal Wiseman, by turns defending and attacking Achilli. In the meantime, Achilli was accused of raping or assaulting four of his domestic servants and a further young woman. In 1850, Pius IX re-established the hierarchy of the Catholic Church in England and Wales and excited popular religious divisions. John Henry Newman was minded to repeat Wiseman's allegations, of sexual immorality and that Achilli had misrepresented his expulsion from the Catholic Church, in a lecture but first took legal advice, on 16 July, from his confidant James Hope-Scott for fear of a libel suit.

Could you off hand answer me a question? Could I be had up for a libel, in criminal court or civil, for saying against Dr. Achilli the contents of the Article in the Dublin, since published as a pamphlet? I can't make out he has answered it. It contains the gravest charges, ... with many of the legal documents proving them.

Hope-Scott was reassuring, expressing the opinion that an action was possible but not probable and that the risk was worth taking. Newman delivered his lecture on 28 July 1850. In August, The Evangelical Alliance gave notice that they intended to support Achilli in a libel action against Newman.

== Newman's trial for libel ==
Achilli offered a compromise but Newman felt that he could not admit any culpability. Such an admission would taint Wiseman and the wider church in addition to himself. Newman asked Wiseman for whatever documentary evidence he possessed but Wiseman, unworldly at the best of times, was distracted by other matters and could offer nothing.

In November 1851, Achilli swore an affidavit denying the allegations made against him. This enabled him to bring criminal proceedings for the common law offence of defamatory libel against Newman, rather than a simple civil action for damages. Newman was liable to maximum sentence of an unlimited fine or a year's imprisonment.

The trial began on 21 June and lasted five days. The Attorney-General Sir Frederic Thesiger led for the prosecution, assisted by Solicitor-General Sir Fitzroy Kelly. Newman was supported by a formidable team of lawyers led by Sir Alexander Cockburn and including sympathetic Anglo-Catholic Edward Lowth Badeley. Henry Matthews had advised Newman to plead justification, that the allegations were true, and the English libel law put the burden of proof on Newman. Newman sent a deputation abroad to gather evidence and they returned with some of Achilli's victims from Italy and Malta, willing to give evidence. However, the presiding judge, John Campbell, 1st Baron Campbell, refused the witnesses' testimony and allegedly fuelled the jury's prejudice against Newman. Judge Campbell was the first judge to admit a document from the Roman Inquisition as evidence in an English court.

Newman was convicted of libel on 25 June 1852. It was found that he had failed to justify 22 of the 23 charges. On 31 January 1853, he was fined £100 (equivalent to £12,070 in 2025). His £12,000 legal costs (equivalent to £1,448,420 in 2025) were borne by an international public subscription among Catholics. Judge John Taylor Coleridge later wrote to Keble:

It is a very painful matter for us who must hail this libel as false, believing it is in great part true—or at least that it may be.

== After the trial ==
A leading article in The Times summarised liberal opinion when it described the proceedings as:

... indecorous in their nature, unsatisfactory in their result, and little calculated to increase the respect of the people for the administration of justice or the estimation by foreign nations of the English name and character. We consider that a great blow has been given to the administration of justice in this country, and that Roman Catholics will henceforth have only too good reason for asserting that there is no justice for them in cases tending to arouse the Protestant feelings of judges and juries.

The outcome of the trial was a Pyrrhic victory for Achilli whose reputation was ruined by his accusers. He travelled to the US in 1853 with the Swedenborgians and worked for the American Bible Union on translating the New Testament into Italian. He sent his wife to Italy and, in 1859 found himself in court accused of adultery with a Miss Bogue. In 1860, he disappeared, leaving his eldest son, aged eight, to the care of Miss Bogue. A note written in Achilli's name implied that he intended suicide. Nothing more is known of him.

== See also ==
- List of people who disappeared mysteriously (pre-1910)

== Bibliography ==
- Achilli, G. (1851). Dealings with the Inquisition, or, Papal Rome, Her Priests, and her Jesuits, with Important Disclosures. London: A. Hall, Virtue & Co.
- Achilli vs. Newman. New York: Dewitt & Davenport. 1852. Archived from the original on 3 May 2012.
- Cantimori, D. (1960). "Achilli, Giacinto". In Ghisalberti, A. M. (ed.). Dizionario Biografico Degli Italiani. Vol. 1. Rome. p. 144.
- Dessain, C. S., ed. (1961). The Letters and Diaries of John Henry Newman. Vol. 14–15.
- Finlason, W. F. (1852). Report of the Trial and Preliminary Proceedings in the Case of the Queen on the Prosecution of G. Achilli v. Dr Newman.
- Gilley, S. (2004). "Achilli, (Giovanni) Giacinto (b. c.1803)". Oxford Dictionary of National Biography. Oxford University Press. (subscription, Wikipedia Library access or UK public library membership required)
- Ker, I. (January 2007) [2004]. "Newman, John Henry (1801–1890)". Oxford Dictionary of National Biography (online ed.). Oxford University Press. (subscription, Wikipedia Library access or UK public library membership required)
- Mirow, M. C. (1995–1996). "Roman Catholicism on trial in Victorian England: the libel case of John Henry Newman and Dr. Achilli". Catholic Lawyer. 36: 401–453.
- Ward, W. (1912). "The Achilli Trial". Life of John Henry Cardinal Newman. Vol. 1. London: Longmans, Green and Co.
- Webb, Diana; Webb, Tony (2020). The Anglo-Florentines: The British in Tuscany, 1814–1860. London: Bloomsbury.
- Wiseman, N. P. (1851). Dr Achilli: Authentic 'Brief Sketch of the Life of Dr Giacinto Achilli'., expanded from Dublin Review 56 (1850)
