= Volte Basse =

- Frazione
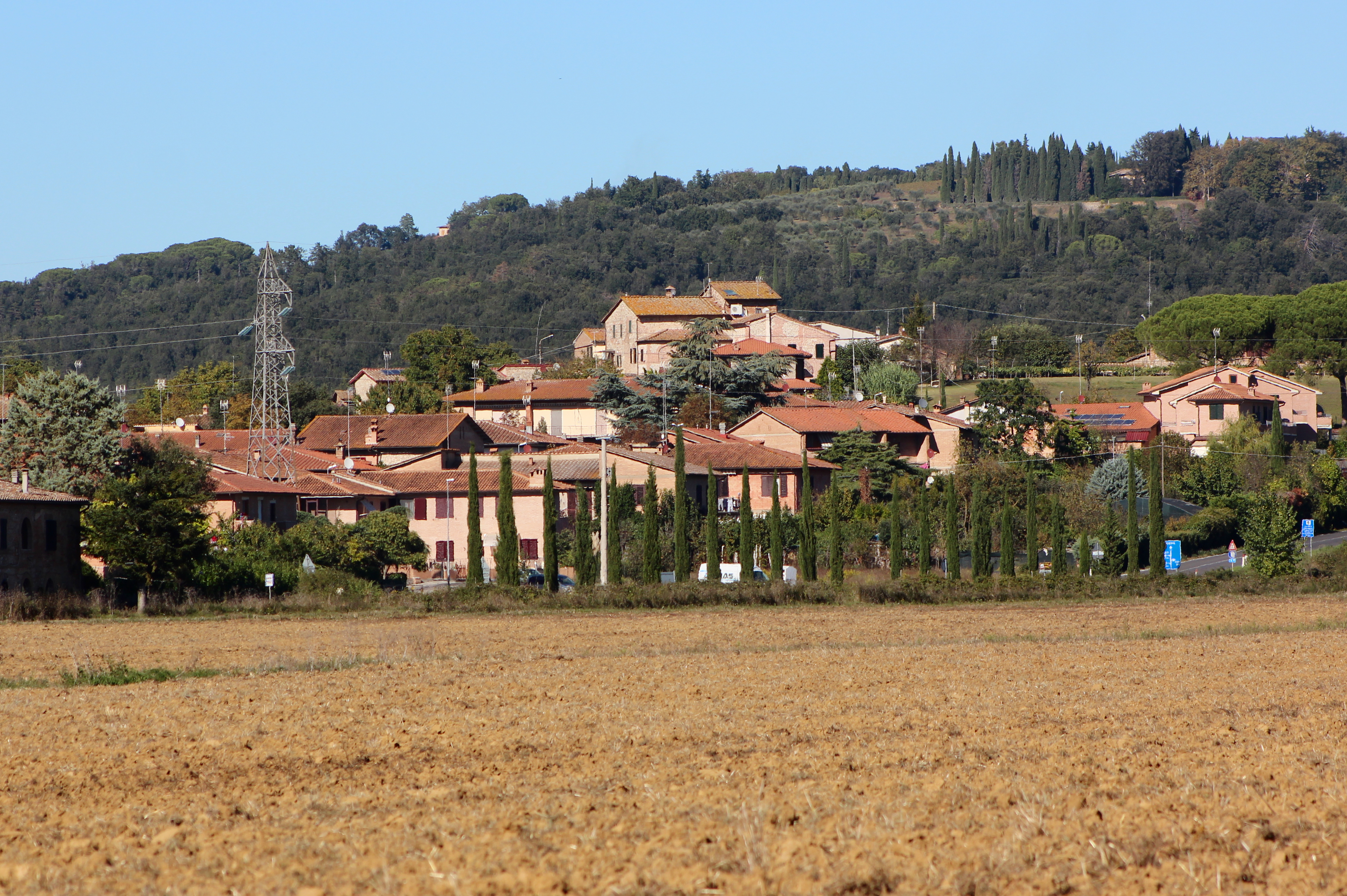
- View of Volte Basse

- Location of Volte Basse in Italy
- Coordinates: 43°17′20″N 11°16′10″E
- Country: Italy
- Region: Tuscany
- Province: Siena (SI)
- Comune: Sovicille; Siena (partially)
- Elevation: 223 m (732 ft)

Population (2011)
  - Total: 486
- Time zone: UTC+1 (CET)
  - Summer (DST): UTC+2 (CEST)

Volte Basse is a village in Tuscany, central Italy, administratively a frazione of the comune of Sovicille, province of Siena. At the time of the 2001 census its population was 437.
