= Orgia, Sovicille =

Orgia
- Frazione
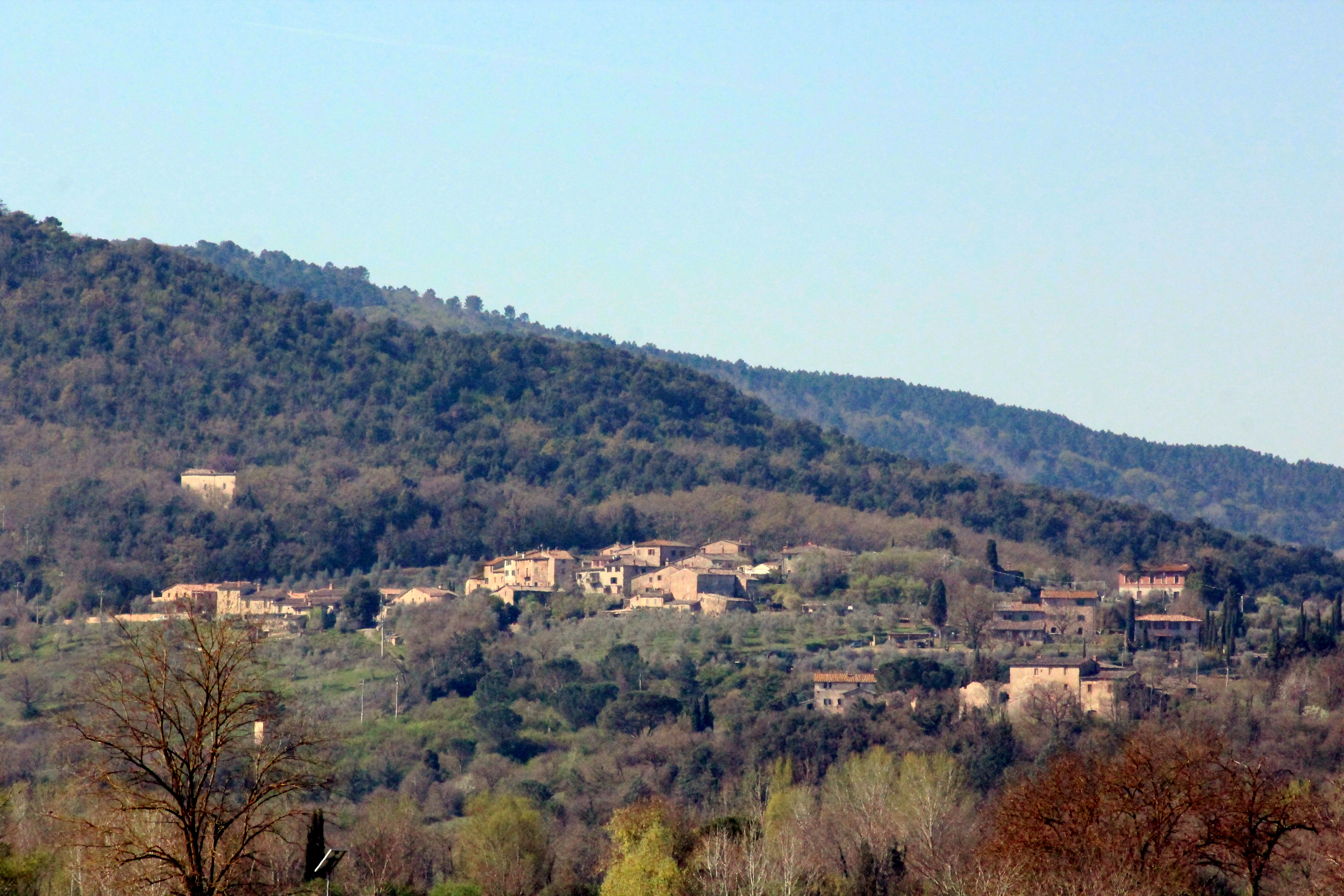
- View of Orgia

- Location of Orgia in Italy
- Coordinates: 43°12′19″N 11°15′11″E
- Country: Italy
- Region: Tuscany
- Province: Siena (SI)
- Comune: Sovicille
- Elevation: 250 m (820 ft)

Population (2011)
  - Total: 66
- Demonym: Orgini
- Time zone: UTC+1 (CET)
  - Summer (DST): UTC+2 (CEST)

Orgia is a village in Tuscany, central Italy, administratively a frazione of the comune of Sovicille, province of Siena. At the time of the 2001 census its population was 52.
