= Malignano =

- Frazione
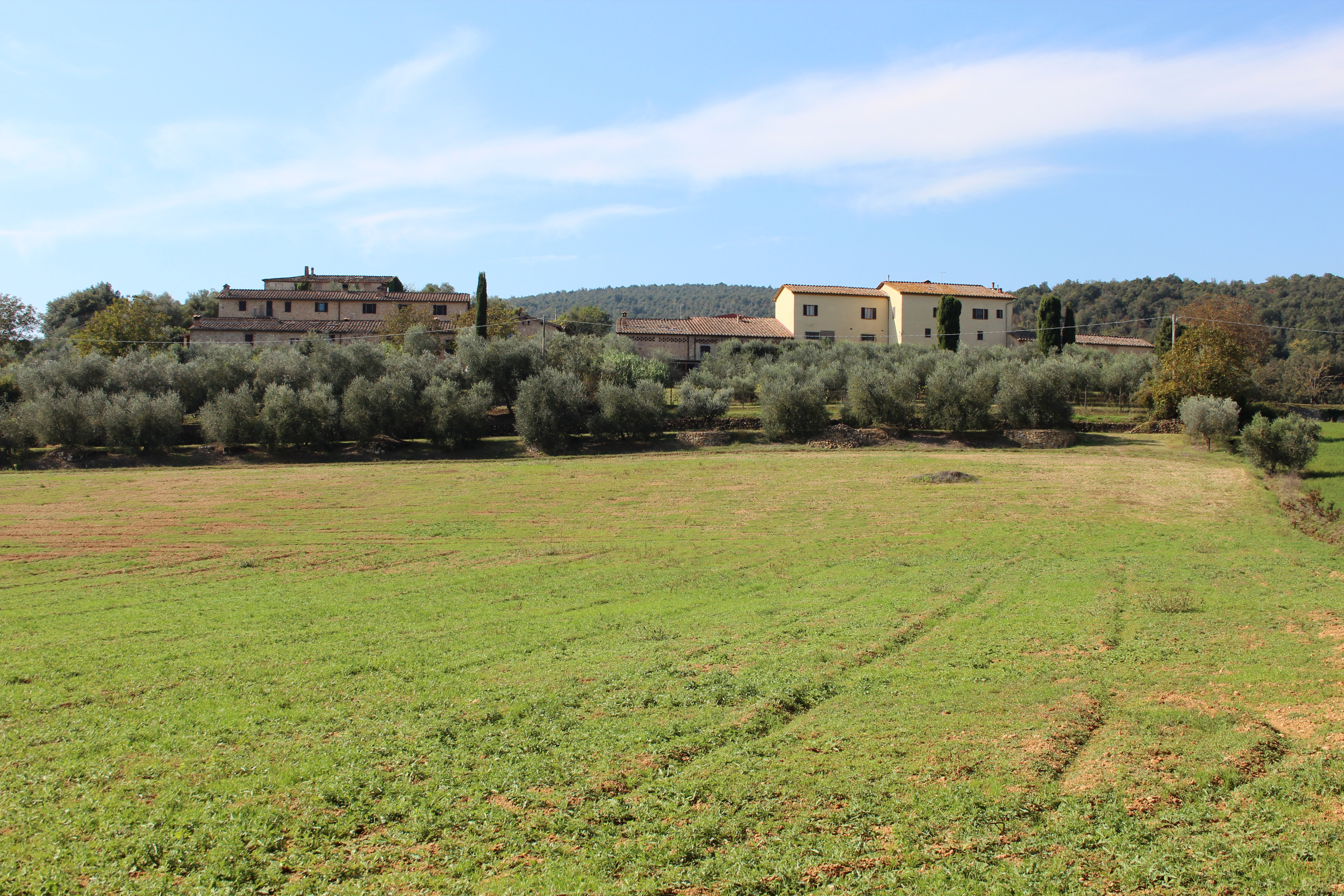
- View of Malignano

- Location of Malignano in Italy
- Coordinates: 43°15′48″N 11°14′1″E
- Country: Italy
- Region: Tuscany
- Province: Siena (SI)
- Comune: Sovicille
- Elevation: 210 m (690 ft)

Population (2011)
  - Total: 11
- Time zone: UTC+1 (CET)
  - Summer (DST): UTC+2 (CEST)

Malignano is a village in Tuscany, central Italy, in the comune of Sovicille, province of Siena. At the time of the 2001 census its population was 21.

Malignano is about 12 km from Siena and 2 km from Sovicille.
