= Tegoia =

- Frazione
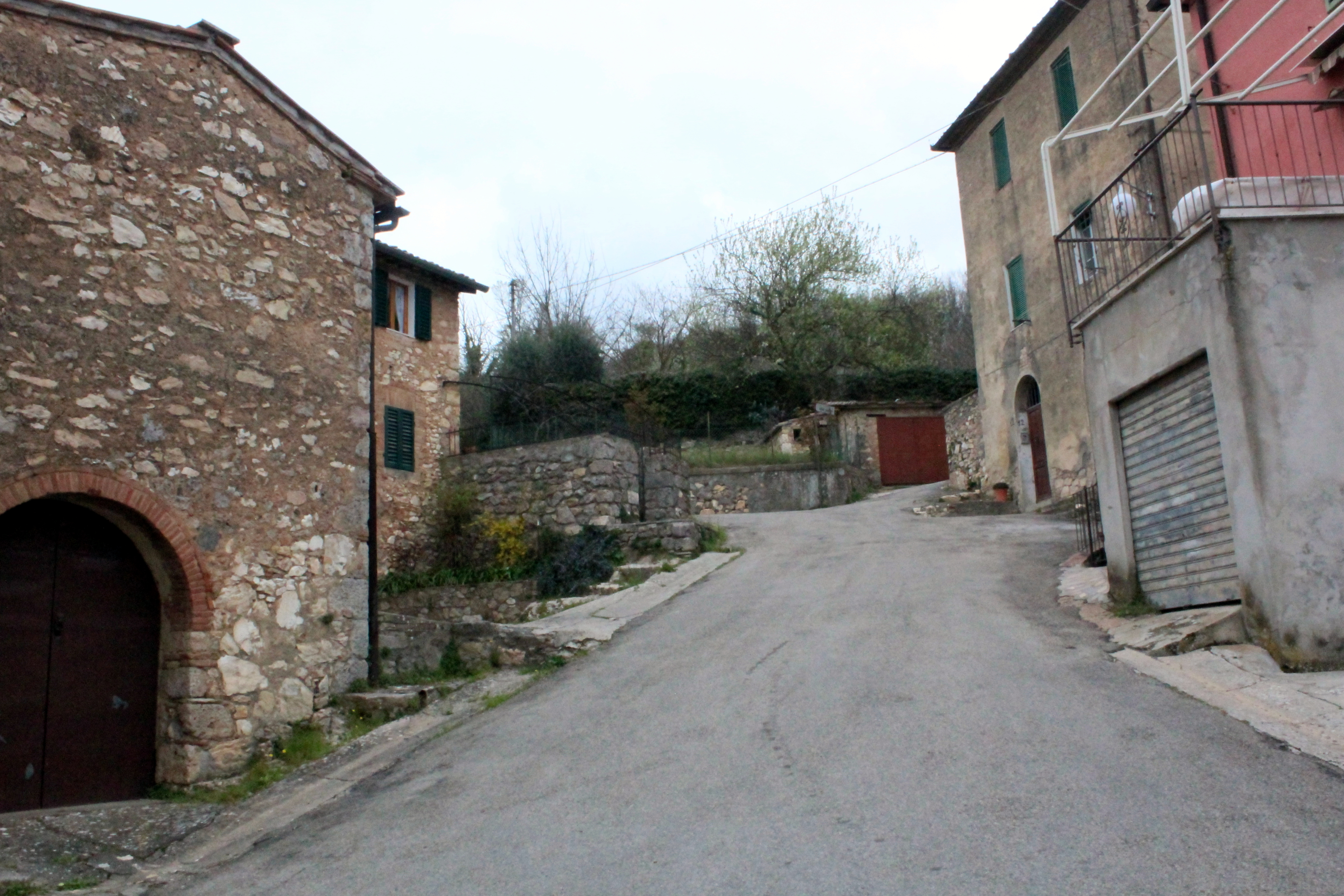

- Location of Tegoia in Italy
- Coordinates: 43°16′39″N 11°11′53″E
- Country: Italy
- Region: Tuscany
- Province: Siena (SI)
- Comune: Sovicille
- Elevation: 490 m (1,610 ft)

Population (2011)
  - Total: 58
- Demonym: Tegoini
- Time zone: UTC+1 (CET)
  - Summer (DST): UTC+2 (CEST)

Tegoia is a village in Tuscany, central Italy, administratively a frazione of the comune of Sovicille, province of Siena. At the time of the 2001 census its population was 53.
