= Cerreto Selva =

- Frazione
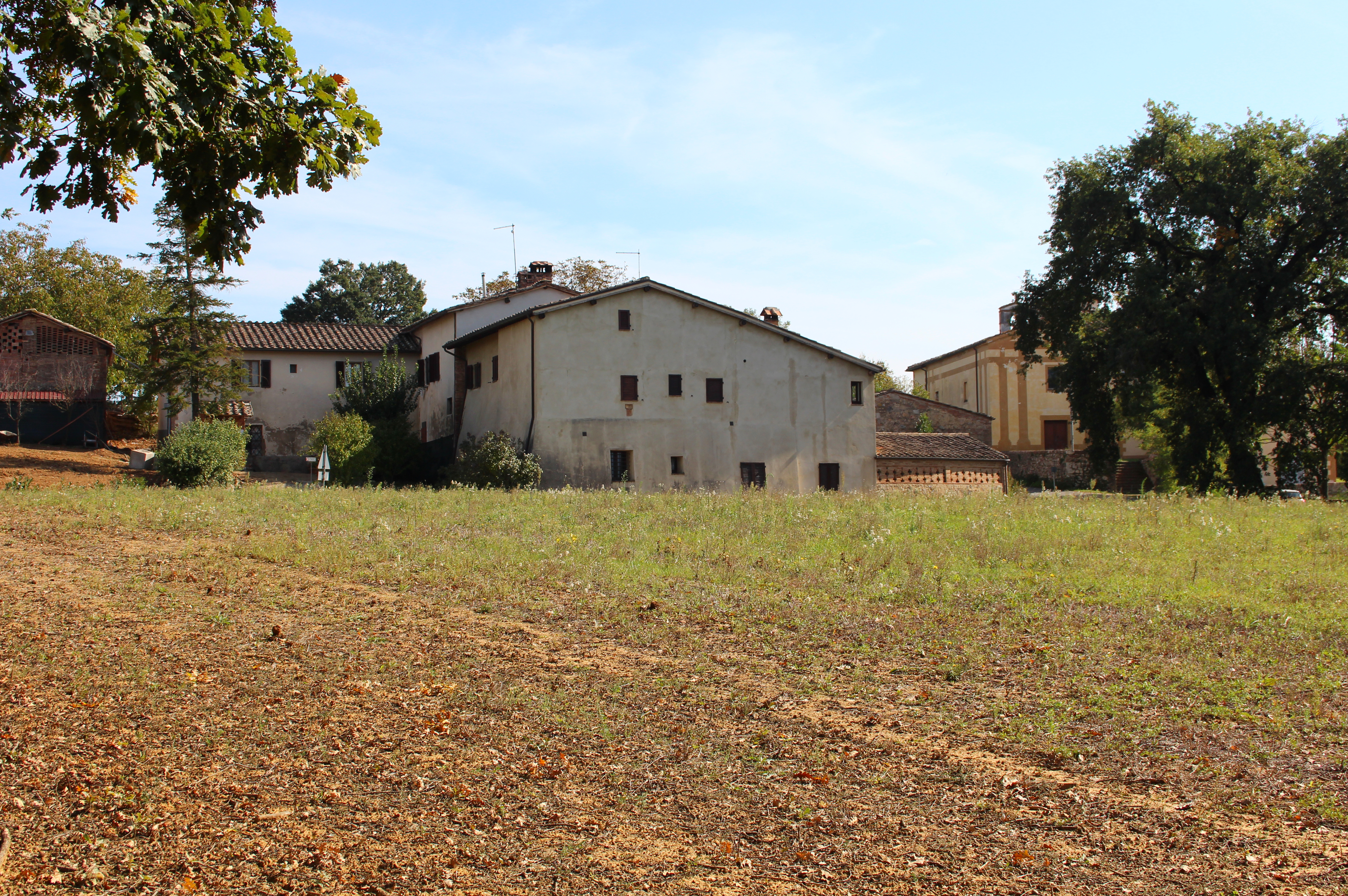

- Location of Cerreto Selva in Italy
- Coordinates: 43°16′52″N 11°16′12″E
- Country: Italy
- Region: Tuscany
- Province: Siena (SI)
- Comune: Sovicille
- Elevation: 215 m (705 ft)
- Time zone: UTC+1 (CET)
  - Summer (DST): UTC+2 (CEST)

Cerreto Selva is a village in Tuscany, central Italy, located in the comune of Sovicille, province of Siena.

Cerreto Selva is about 10 km from Siena and 5 km from Sovicille.

== Bibliography ==
- Emanuele Repetti (1833). "Cerreto Selva". Dizionario geografico fisico storico della Toscana. Vol. 1. Florence. p. 662.
