= Celleno =

- Comune
- Comune di Celleno
- Coat of arms

- Location within Italy Location within Lazio
- Coordinates: 42°33′N 12°8′E
- Country: Italy
- Region: Lazio
- Province: Viterbo (VT)

Government
  - Mayor: Marco Taschini

Area
  - Total: 24.6 km^{2} (9.5 sq mi)
- Elevation: 407 m (1,335 ft)

Population (2008)
  - Total: 1,359
  - Density: 55.2/km^{2} (143/sq mi)
- Demonym: Cellenesi
- Time zone: UTC+1 (CET)
  - Summer (DST): UTC+2 (CEST)
- Postal code: 01020
- Dialing code: 0761
- Patron saint: Holy Crucifix
- Saint day: 14 September

Celleno is a comune (municipality) of 1 297 inhabitants in the Province of Viterbo in the Italian region Lazio, located about 80 kilometres (50 mi) northwest of Rome and about 15 kilometres (9 mi) north of Viterbo. It was the site of the first battle by South African troops in Italy during the Second World War.

== Notable people ==
- Giacinto Achilli
