= Barontoli =

- Frazione
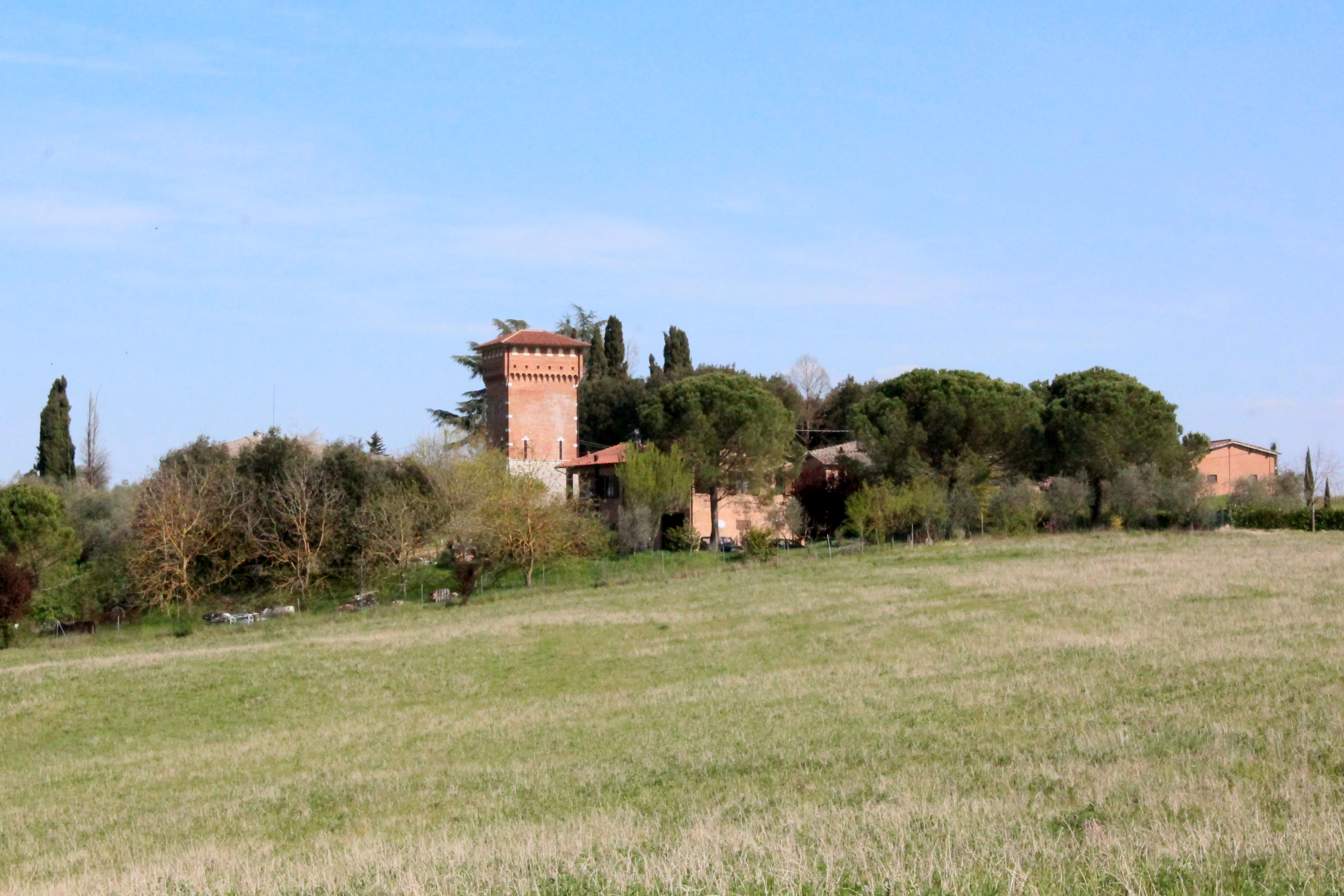
- View of Barontoli

- Location of Barontoli in Italy
- Coordinates: 43°16′11″N 11°16′56″E
- Country: Italy
- Region: Tuscany
- Province: Siena (SI)
- Comune: Sovicille
- Elevation: 230 m (750 ft)
- Time zone: UTC+1 (CET)
  - Summer (DST): UTC+2 (CEST)

Barontoli is a village in Tuscany, central Italy, in the comune of Sovicille, province of Siena.

Barontoli is about 10 km from Siena and 8 km from Sovicille.

== Bibliography ==
- Emanuele Repetti (1833). "Barontoli". Dizionario geografico fisico storico della Toscana. Vol. 1. Florence. p. 283.
