= Tonni, Sovicille =

Tonni
- Frazione
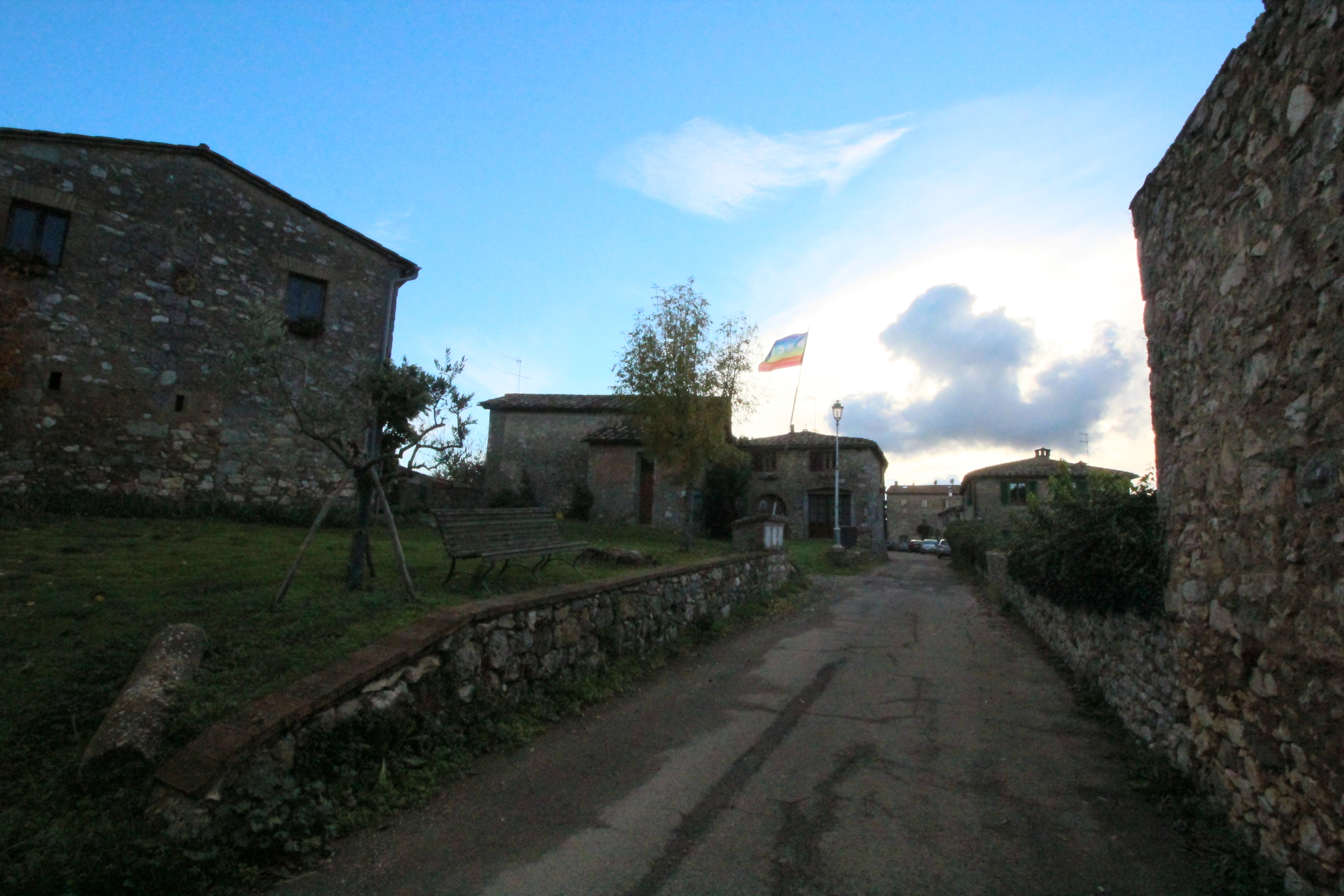

- Location of Tonni in Italy
- Coordinates: 43°14′59″N 11°10′59″E
- Country: Italy
- Region: Tuscany
- Province: Siena (SI)
- Comune: Sovicille
- Elevation: 426 m (1,398 ft)

Population (2011)
  - Total: 29
- Time zone: UTC+1 (CET)
  - Summer (DST): UTC+2 (CEST)

Tonni is a village in Tuscany, central Italy, in the comune of Sovicille, province of Siena. At the time of the 2001 census its population was 26.

Tonni is about 23 km from Siena and 9 km from Sovicille.
