= Sovicille =

- Comune
- Comune di Sovicille
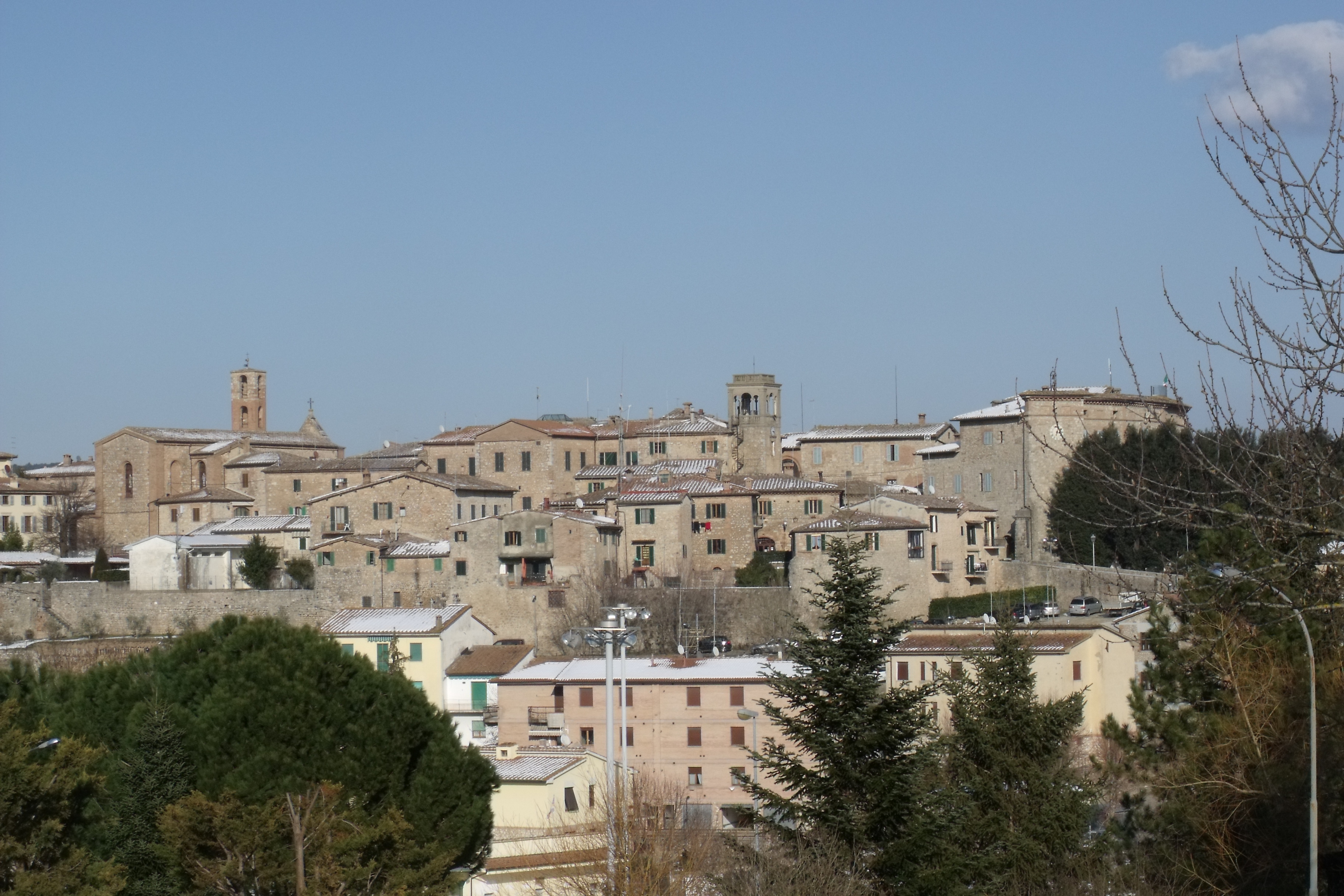
- View of Sovicille

- Coat of arms

- Location within Italy Location within Tuscany
- Coordinates: 43°17′N 11°14′E
- Country: Italy
- Region: Tuscany
- Province: Siena (SI)
- Frazioni: Ancaiano, Brenna, Rosia, San Rocco a Pilli, Tegoia, Torri, Volte Basse

Government
  - Mayor: Giuseppe Gugliotti

Area
  - Total: 143.61 km^{2} (55.45 sq mi)
- Elevation: 265 m (869 ft)

Population (31 December 2010)
  - Total: 9,925
  - Density: 69.11/km^{2} (179.0/sq mi)
- Demonym: Sovicillini
- Time zone: UTC+1 (CET)
  - Summer (DST): UTC+2 (CEST)
- Postal code: 53018
- Dialing code: 0577
- Website: Official website

Sovicille is a comune (municipality) in the Province of Siena in the Italian region of Tuscany. It is located about 60 kilometres (37 miles) south of Florence and approximately 10 kilometres (6 miles) southwest of Siena.

Sovicille borders the comuni of Casole d'Elsa, Chiusdino, Monteriggioni, Monteroni d'Arbia, Monticiano, Murlo, Siena.

== History ==
The name Sovicille has been documented as far back as 1004, but the origins of the area likely date back much further. In 2002, a mosaic from the Roman period was uncovered in the Church of St. John the Baptist, and several Etruscan relics have been found in the immediate area.

During the Middle Ages, the region lay on the borders between Siena and Volterra. The Abbey of Serena, about 30 kilometres to the west, was under the control of Volterra, and the land around Sovicille was included as property of the abbey around the year 1000.

A written record of the place survives from 23 April 1123, in which Pope Alexander III, originally from Siena, identifies it as Sufficille. The name is believed to derive from the Latin words sub (under) and ficinulae or ficus (small fig tree).

The municipal statutes date back to the 13th century. The democratically administered Republic of Siena granted several municipalities, including Sovicille, their own statutes in 1238. These statuses were modified in 1293 and reconfigured into the format that survives today in 1303, granting them the right to make their own laws.

In 1260, Sovicille was occupied by Florence. However, after the Florentine armies were defeated at the Battle of Montaperti that same year, Sovicille reverted to Siena.

In 1333, Sovicille was overrun and burned down by Pisa.

In 1577, the Medici family purchased the lands of Siena from the Emperor for two million ducats. This purchase led to the abolition of democratic institutions and a return to feudalism. Sovicille became a Medici fief and was transformed into an imposing fortress, guarding an access point to their newly expanded territories.

After the death of the last of the Medici rulers, power passed to the Dukes of Lorraine, who remained in control until the late 18th century, when the entire region was invaded by Napoleon Bonaparte's French armies.

The French remained in control until 1814, when, under the terms agreed at the Congress of Vienna, Sovicille was annexed to the Grand Duchy of Tuscany. In 1859, it came under the control of the short-lived United Provinces of Central Italy, a transitional entity that led to its incorporation into the newly formed Kingdom of Italy in 1861.

== Frazioni ==
The municipality is formed by the municipal seat of Sovicille and the towns and villages (frazioni) of Ancaiano, Brenna, Rosia, San Rocco a Pilli, Tegoia, Torri and Volte Basse. Other notable villages include Ampugnano, Arnano, Barontoli, Brucciano, Caggio di Mezzo, Caldana, Carpineto, Castello, Celsa, Cerreto Selva, Costa, Cuove, Malignano, Palazzaccio, Palazzavelli, Pian dei Mori, Piscialembita, Poggio, Poggio Salvi, Ponte allo Spino, Recenza, San Giusto a Balli, San Salvatore a Pilli, Segalaie, Simignano, Stigliano, Solatio di Sotto, Toiano, Tonni, Valacchio and Valli.
