= Ancaiano =

- Frazione
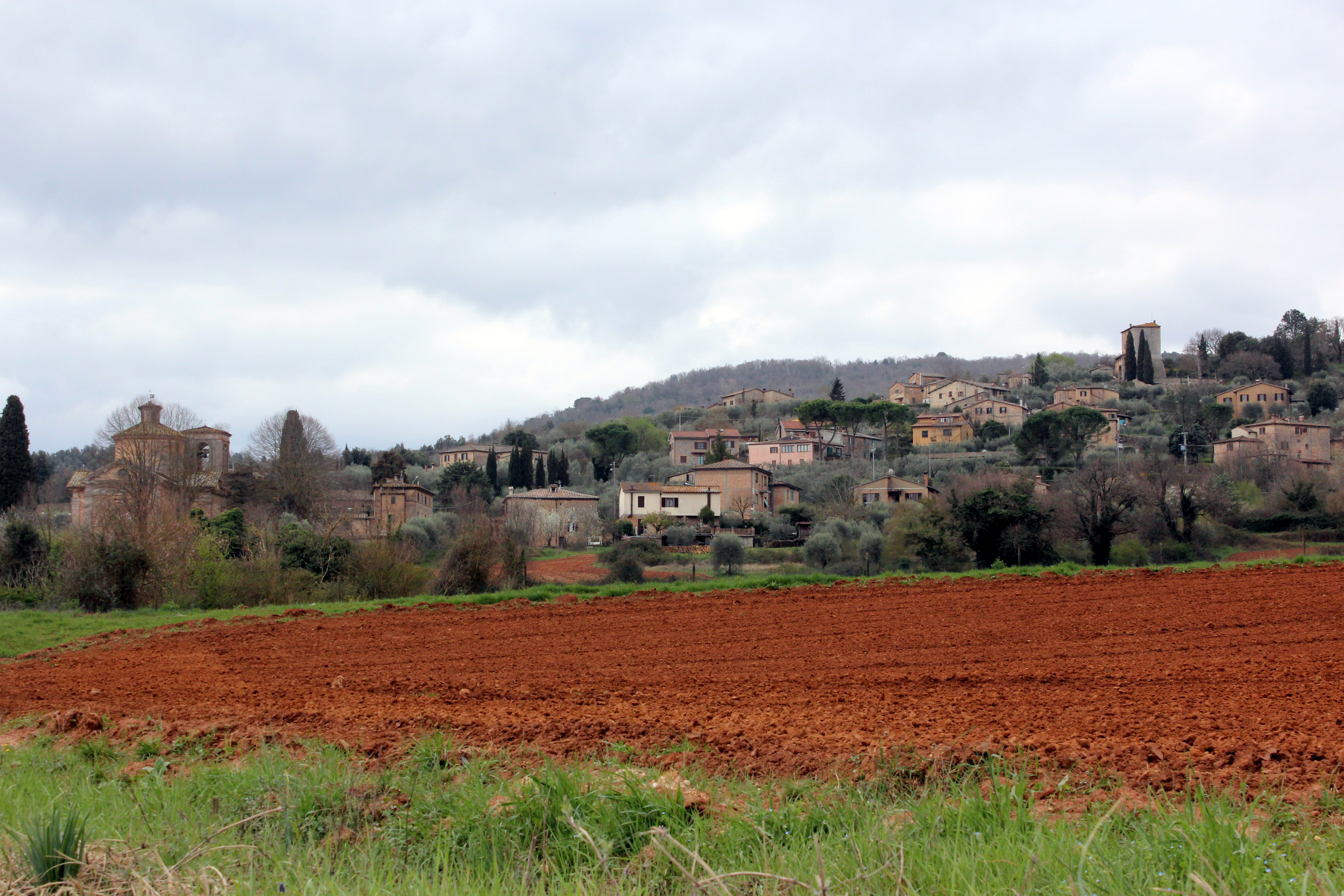
- View of Ancaiano

- Location of Ancaiano in Italy
- Coordinates: 43°17′34″N 11°12′3″E
- Country: Italy
- Region: Tuscany
- Province: Siena (SI)
- Comune: Sovicille
- Elevation: 257 m (843 ft)

Population (2011)
  - Total: 127
- Demonym: Ancaianini / Ancaianesi
- Time zone: UTC+1 (CET)
  - Summer (DST): UTC+2 (CEST)

Ancaiano is a village in Tuscany, central Italy, administratively a frazione of the comune of Sovicille, province of Siena. At the time of the 2001 census its population was 109.
