= Tontine (card game) =

French card game

- A sociable game of chance
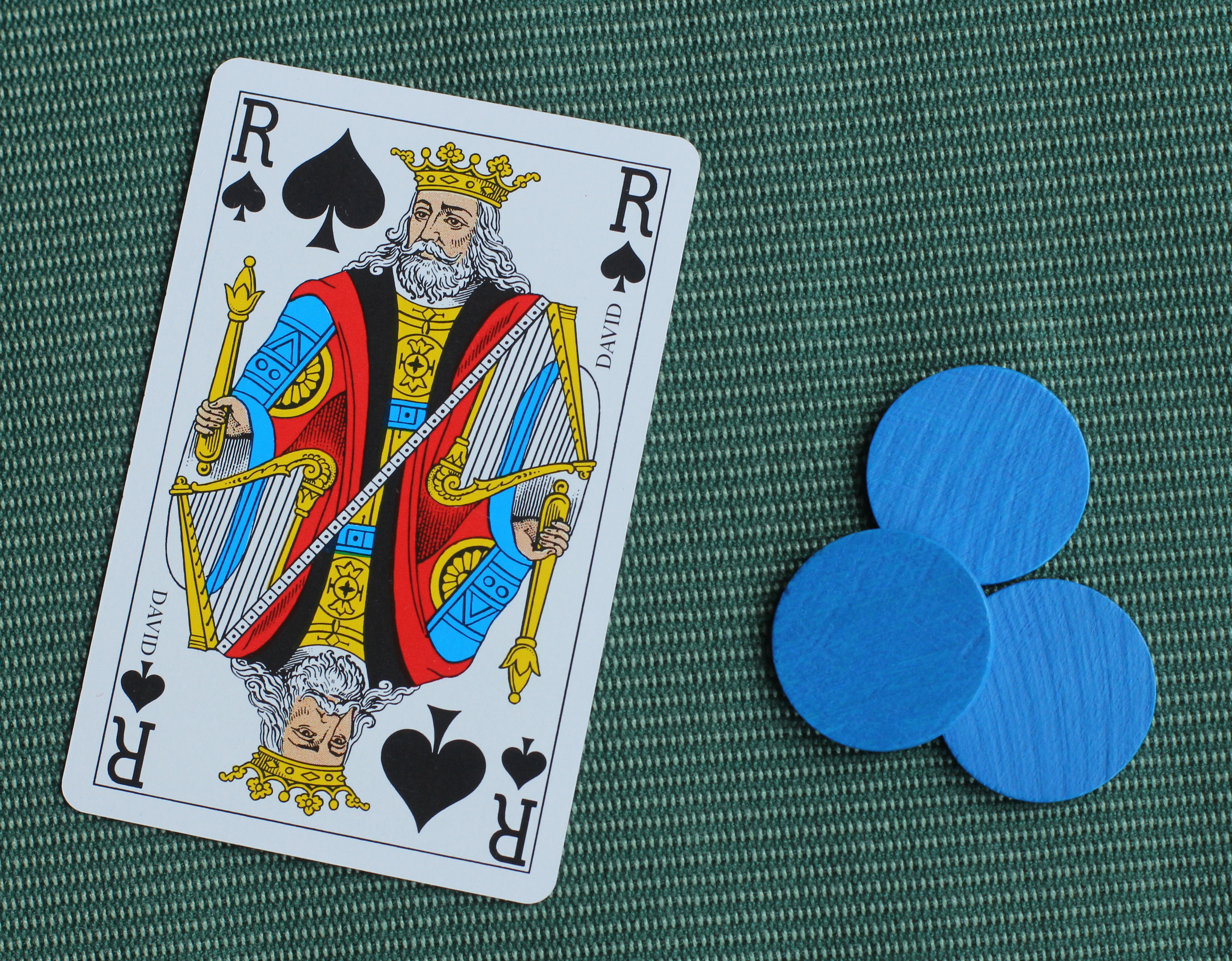
- A King earns 3 jetons
- Origin: France
- Type: Game of hazard
- Players: 5 – 12
- Skills: nil
- Cards: 52
- Deck: French-suited, Paris pattern
- Play: Anticlockwise
- Chance: entirely random

Tontine is an historical French gambling game for five to twelve players using playing cards. It is a social game of pure chance in which the chips (jetons) circulate between the players and the pool until one player wins all the chips in play.

== History ==
The rules of Tontine are recorded as early as 1725 and continued to be published throughout the 18th and 19th centuries.

== Rules ==
Five to twelve play using a standard pack of 52 cards. Only the rank of the cards is important; suits are irrelevant. Deal and play are anticlockwise.

=== Preliminaries ===
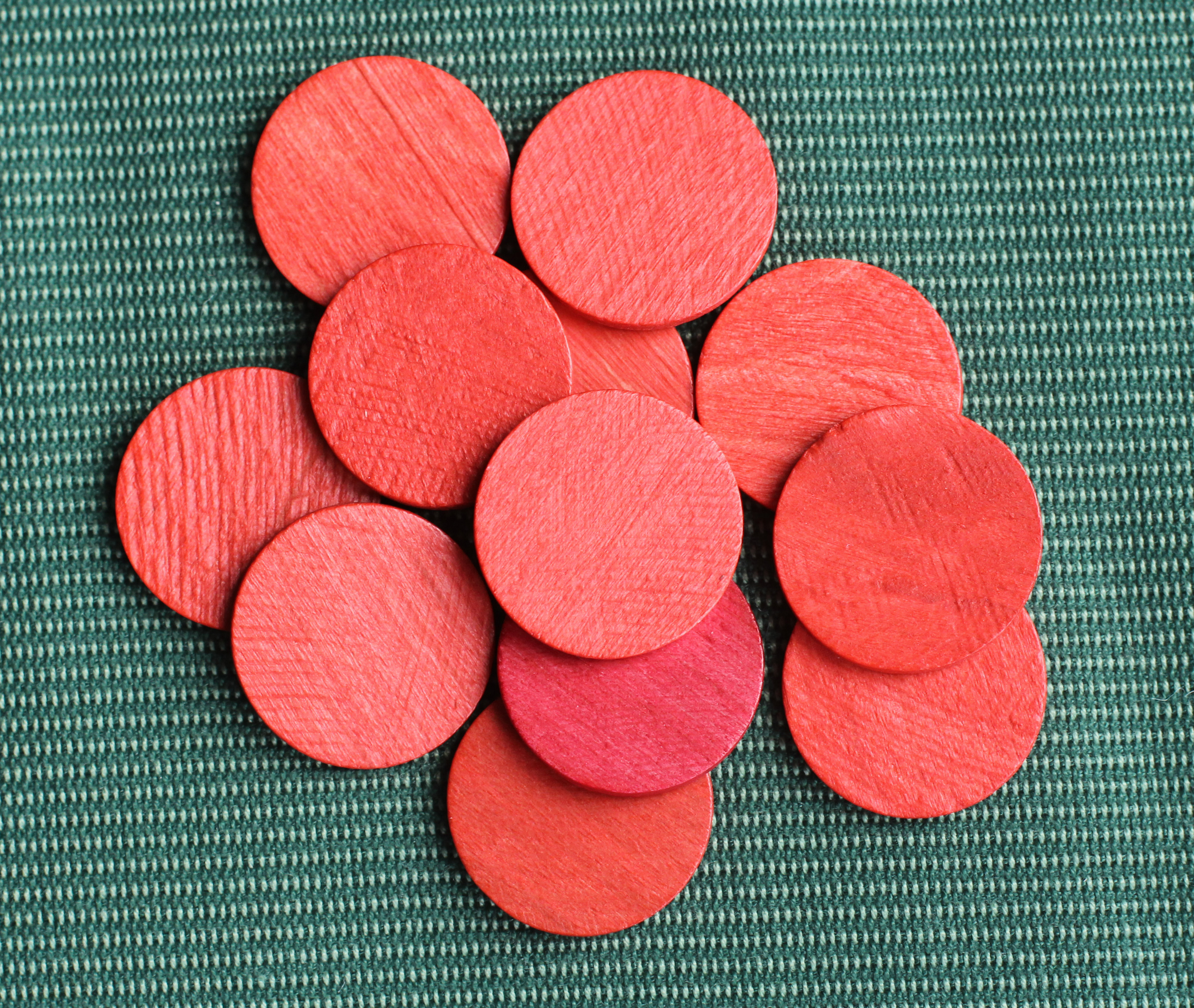
A mise of 12 jetons

At the start of the game, each player receives a quantity of jetons, the amount being determined by how long they want to play. This is called the mise. The higher the mise, the longer the game will last. A typical amount might be 12 jetons per player. A small table basket (corbillon) is placed in the middle of the table to which each player antes 3 jetons. The contents of the basket constitute the pool. The game is played until only one player has any jetons left.

=== Deal ===
Each player draws a card from the pack, face down, and whoever has the highest becomes the first dealer. If two or more tie, they draw another card until the one has the highest. Dealer shuffles the pack, offers it to the left for cutting and then deals one card, face down, to each player, beginning with the player to the right and ending with himself. Accidentally flipping a card does not matter and the dealer does not have to redeal. The dealer keeps the remainder in a pile, face down to their right as the talon.

=== Play and payments ===
First hand, the player to the right of the dealer, turns their card over, and depending on the type of card, pays or receives jetons from the pool or other players according to the table below. Then the turn moves to the player to the right and so on in turn, the dealer going last.

- King - win 3 jetons from the pool
- Queen - win 2 jetons from the pool
- Jack - win 1 jeton from the pool
- Ten - pass
- Ace - pay 1 jeton to first player to left
- Deuce - pay 2 jetons to second player to left
- Trey - pay 3 jetons to third player to left
- Four, Six, Eight - pay 2 jetons to the pool
- Five, Seven, Nine - pay 1 jeton to the pool

A player who runs out of jetons is 'dead' (mort); they stay in the game, but are not dealt a card. They may still earn jetons again from a player dealt an Ace, Deuce or Trey, whereupon they are 'resuscitated' (ressuscité) and may play again. A player who has fewer jetons than he or she is required to pay, only pays what he or she has and the rest is written off.

The deal rotates to the right. As soon as there is only one player left with jetons, the game stops immediately. That player has won and sweeps the pool.

== Literature ==
- _ (1725). Académie Universelle des Jeux. Paris: Théodore Legras.
- Moulidars, Th. de (1888). Grande encyclopédie méthodique, universelle, illustrée des jeux et des divertissements de l'esprit et du corps. Paris.
