= Tonti =

Tonti or de Tonti may refer to:

== People ==
- Alessandro Tonti (born 1992), Italian association football player
- Aldo Tonti (1910–1988), Italian cinematographer
- Andrea Tonti (born 1976), Italian cyclist
- Enzo Tonti (1935–2021), Italian physicist and mathematician
- Giulio Tonti (1844–1918), Italian Roman Catholic archbishop and cardinal
- Henri de Tonti (ca. 1649–1704), French-Italian explorer
- Lino Tonti (1920–2002), Italian motorcycle engineer
- Lorenzo de Tonti (ca. 1602–ca. 1684), Italian banker
- Michelangelo Tonti (1566–1622), Italian Roman Catholic cardinal
- Nicholas Tonti-Filippini (1956–2014), Australian bioethicist

== Places ==
- De Tonti, alternative spelling of Detonti, Arkansas, an unincorporated community in Arkansas, United States
- Tonti Township, Marion County, Illinois, United States
  - Tonti, Illinois, unincorporated community, United States

== Other ==
- USNS Tonti, US Navy tanker

== See also ==
- Alphonse de Tonty (ca. 1659–1727), French settler in America
- Tontitown, Arkansas, city, United States
- Tonni (name)
- Tontine (disambiguation)
