= San Rocco a Pilli =

- Frazione
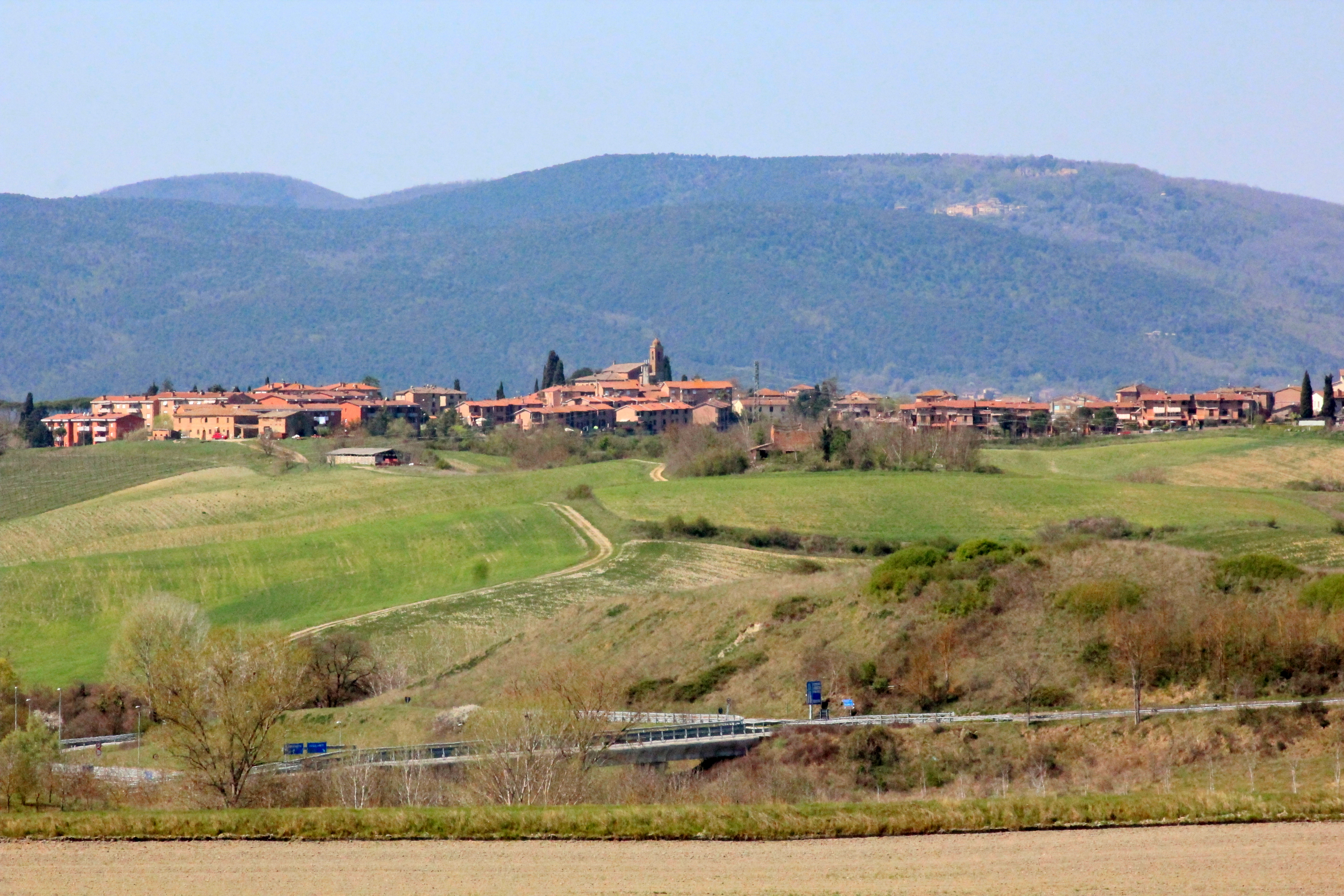
- View of San Rocco a Pilli

- Location of San Rocco a Pilli in Italy
- Coordinates: 43°15′24″N 11°17′6″E
- Country: Italy
- Region: Tuscany
- Province: Siena (SI)
- Comune: Sovicille; Siena (partially)
- Elevation: 258 m (846 ft)

Population (2011)
  - Total: 2,579
- Demonym: Sanrocchini / Sarrocchini
- Time zone: UTC+1 (CET)
  - Summer (DST): UTC+2 (CEST)

San Rocco a Pilli is a town in Tuscany, central Italy, administratively a frazione of the comune of Sovicille, province of Siena. At the time of the 2001 census its population was 2,288.

== History ==
The discovery of objects of Etruscan and Roman origins demonstrates how the area where the town is located has been inhabited since ancient times.

== Sports ==
Tuscany Camp, an elite athletics training camp that hosts many Ugandan and Burundian athletes, is based in San Rocco a Pilli.
