= Charlotte Elizabeth Tonna =

Victorian English novelist (1790–1846)

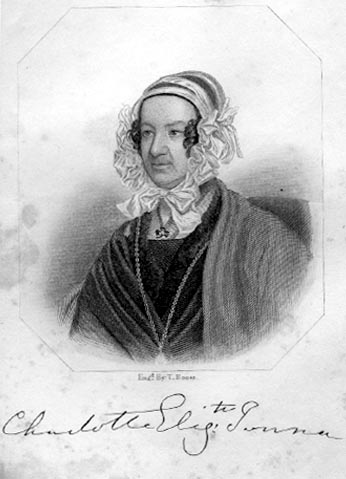
- Charlotte Elizabeth Tonna
- Born: 1 October 1790; Norwich, Norfolk, England
- Died: 12 July 1846 (aged 55); Ramsgate, Kent, England
- Occupation: Writer (novelist)
- Writing career
- Pen name: Charlotte Elizabeth
- Genres: evangelical Protestant literature, poetry, Children's Literature

Charlotte Elizabeth Tonna (1 October 1790 – 12 July 1846) was a popular Victorian English writer and novelist who wrote under the pseudonym Charlotte Elizabeth. She was "a woman of strong mind, powerful feeling, and of no inconsiderable share of tact." Her work focused on promoting women's rights (see her books The Wrongs of Women and Helen Fleetwood) and evangelical Protestantism, as seen in her book Protection; or, The Candle and the Dog, in which the following characteristic quote appears: "Our greatest blessings come to us by prayer, and the studying of God's word." As Isabella A. Owen remarked in 1901, "She was above all else an anti-Romanist, a most protesting Protestant." Harriet Beecher Stowe wrote of her memoir Personal Recollections (1841): "We know of no piece of autobiography in the English language which can compare with this in richness of feeling and description and power of exciting interest."

== Life ==
Tonna was born on 1 October 1790, the daughter of Reverend Michael Browne, rector of St. Giles' Church and minor canon of Norwich Cathedral, who contributed greatly to the development of Tonna's strong faith and devotion to God, the consequence of being raised in a "Tory, royalist, Church-of-England family". Her mother Charlotte was the daughter of local physician Dr. John Murray.

She was baptised on 22 October 1790 at St. Martin-at-Palace Church in her hometown of Norwich.

In her early youth, she "displayed a very ardent temperament and lively imagination." She was so eager to learn that she accepted an offer from her uncle to teach her the French language before she was six years old. During this time of learning, she strained her eyes so hard "that she was deprived of sight for some months." After this period of temporary vision impairment, she suffered permanent hearing loss at the age of ten, "due to medication she was taking for other ailments."

=== First marriage ===
In 1813 she married Captain George Phelan of the 60th regiment, and spent two years with him while he served with his regiment in Nova Scotia (1817–1819). They then returned to Ireland, where Phelan owned a small estate near Kilkenny. The marriage was not a happy one, and it was reported that Captain Phelan was addicted to "gross intemperance" and personally abused Charlotte during their marriage. She was very patient towards him and refused to seek help from her friends, but as the abuse continued she was forced to separate from him in 1824. Charlotte was aware that her marital troubles could be interpreted many ways so, to keep her privacy, "Tonna made her friends and acquaintances promise that in the event of her death they would destroy all her letters and other correspondence". Her pen name "Charlotte Elizabeth" was a tactic she used to protect her writing earnings from Captain Phelan when they were married.

Mrs. Phelan subsequently resided with her brother, Captain John Browne, for two years at Clifton, where she made the acquaintance of Hannah More. Shortly thereafter, she was deprived of her sibling's support, as, "tragically, John Murray Browne drowned in a boating accident whilst posted with his regiment in Mullingar, County Westmeath, Ireland, in 1829." After the death of her brother, "she undertook the sole charge of the education and maintenance of his two sons." She later moved to Sandhurst, and then to London.

=== Second marriage ===
In 1837 Captain Phelan died in Dublin. Despite Captain Phelan's abuse of her and their separation, after his death she took care of his mother and sister which spoke "volumes of her benevolence and Christian principle".

In 1841, Charlotte married Lewis Hippolytus Joseph Tonna. Her second marriage to Tonna was a much happier one, he being an "excellent husband" who was very active in London society. Also a Protestant writer, he wrote a memoir entitled The Life of Charlotte Elizabeth in 1869 to celebrate his late wife's life.

As a woman active in public service, Tonna "began a Sunday school in her cottage, did charity work in the Irish ghetto in London, and established a Protestant Church in St. Giles in the early 1830s"

=== Death ===
In early 1844, a cancerous mass appeared under Tonna's left axilla, eventually causing "her death by attacking an artery and causing exhaustion from loss of blood." She died at Ramsgate on 12 July 1846, and was buried in St. George's churchyard, Ramsgate, Kent. Two months prior to her death, she expressed to her husband that she did not want to be buried in a vault but in a perishable "simple earth grave". This was due to her deep devotion to God and the common Christian belief that from "Dust thou art, and unto dust thou shalt return."

== Writing career ==
Charlotte became a novelist after the death of her father because "a small annuity was all that [her] mother could depend on". Her religious conversion also had a great impact on her writing career. At her first husband's estate in Dublin, she had an epiphany and for six months "experienced the mighty power of God" at work in her life. At that moment she devoted her career to attempting to converting "everyone, especially Irish Catholics to Evangelical Protestantism".

=== Religious outreach ===
While in Ireland, Charlotte began to write tracts for various religious societies. Her first essay in authorship was in aid of the objects of the Dublin Tract Society in 1820. Her tracts became popular because of their sheer, and deliberate simplicity; "if, on reading a manuscript to a child of five years old, [she] found there was a single sentence or word above his comprehension, it was instantly corrected to suit that lowly standard." She was the subject of continued persecution, and because of claims made against her, "she was obliged to publish her works under her baptismal names of 'Charlotte Elizabeth.'"

==== Anti-Catholic sentiments ====
She was very hostile to the Catholic Church, and some of her publications are said to have been placed on the Index Expurgatorius. In 1837 she published an abridgment of Foxe's Book of Martyrs and also an abridgment called The Female Martyrs of the English Reformation due to her interest in Protestant martyrs. She was so intrigued with martyrs that she once asked her father, "Papa, may I be a martyr?" during her childhood.

==== Protestant editorial work ====
She edited The Protestant Annual, 1840, and The Christian Lady's Magazine from 1836, and The Protestant Magazine from 1841 until her death, with "her writings being dictated when [she] was unable to hold the pen." In The Christian Lady's Magazine, she was able to voice her interests such as "the superiority of rural over urban life, the domestic role of women, the dangers of Popery, the hatred of unions, and, of course, the urgency of being born again through Christ". She also wrote poems, two of which, "The Maiden City" and "No Surrender," were written especially for the Orange cause. Writing in 1899, O'Donoghue stated that these "are extremely vigorous and popular. They are quite the best Orange songs that have been written."

==== Writing on social causes ====
Her drive for social change was prominent in The Wrongs of Woman, wherein she wrote about the poor working conditions of female workers in London. The story focused on Kate Clark, a newly hired lace runners apprentice, who faced great work obstacles such as "long hours, poor pay and lack of food" which was common amongst labour workers in London. Published in four volumes between 1843 and 1844, the book adequately described the sickly and dirty lifestyle London workers endured during the Victorian era. She reflects, concerning the benefit for masters in maintaining low wages and poor conditions for the poor,

...in the desperate spirit of speculation, commercial men will set no limits to the production of what they may possibly sell, to the farther increase of their growing capital; and that in the struggle for means to live by the very scanty portion of this accumulated wealth which is allowed to circulate among them, the really destitute class are as little disposed to reject the most inadequate remuneration for their heavy toil; thus at once glutting the market with labourers, and keeping down the price of work.

Another popular work by Tonna was Helen Fleetwood: A Tale of the Factories which told the story of cotton mill child labour workers, which was serialised between 1839 and March 1841 in The Christian Lady's Magazine. Her concern for the social and economic conditions of women expressed in her writing helped gather support for passage of the London Factory Acts of 1844, 1847, and 1848.

Sympathetic towards the Jewish community despite desiring their conversion to Christianity, she believed that "Jews might retain their traditional rituals and still reach salvation by accepting Jesus Christ as the Messiah." In 1843, she published Judah's Lion as her last book-length work of fiction which focused upon Jewish beliefs and culture.

=== Animal welfare ===
Tonna wrote Kindness to Animals, Or, The Sin of Cruelty Exposed and Rebuked (1845), an early work supportive of animal welfare.

== Literary reception ==
Throughout her life, Charlotte Tonna was very popular amongst Evangelical Protestant communities. Critics from the New York Evangelist described her writings as "too fast" and described her style as "consequently diffuse and inelegant, and there is a too incessant prosperity to preach". However, they praised her vividness of description and sprightliness to her writing. Additionally, other critics complained of her stories having "thin characterizations" and long tangents that disrupted the plot, but still praised her ability to describe in intense details the poor working conditions of labour workers in Helen Fleetwood: A Tale of the Factories. The Christian Ladies Magazine also mentioned Tonna's "unbalanced" style but claimed her vulnerability and "intensity of feeling" in her writing" atoned for it.

People praised her ability to creatively instruct children in her children's stories as she frequently used, "nature in religious analogies in both her prose and poems" to help children learn how to live. These analogies can be seen in works such as The Bee, The Swan, The Wasp, The Bow and the Cloud, The Willow Tree, and The Hen and Her Chickens. She was inspired by Protestant authors John Bunyan and Isaac Watts, who also used religious analogies to instruct children.

Due to her popularity, her works were translated into many diverse languages such as "French, Italian, Marathi, and the Mpongwe language of Gabon in West Africa." In 1845, the Christian Examiner praised her work and declared that Tonna had "secured an unhesitating reception amongst most of those called Evangelical Christians."

In the twenty-first century, her dramatic writing was evaluated as influencing public opinion in a way that factual accounts of the suffering of children and women working long hours in factories had not. Her writing was compared with the sometimes contrasting impacts of TV dramas and documentaries about the same subject, where the drama made a greater public impact.

== Works ==
- Principalities and Powers in Heavenly Places (New York, 1842)
- Zadoc, the Outcast of Israel (London, 1825)
- Perseverance: a Tale (London, 1826)
- Rachel: a Tale (London, 1826)
- Consistency: a Tale (London, 1826)
- Osric: a Missionary Tale, and other Poems (Dublin, 1826?)
- Izram: a Mexican Tale, and other Poems (London, 1826)
- The System: a Tale of the West Indies (London, 1827)
- The Rockite: an Irish Story (London, 1829)
- The Museum (Dublin, 1832)
- The Mole (Dublin, 1835)
- Alice Benden, or the Bowed Shilling (London, 1838)
- Letters from Ireland, 1837 (London, 1838)
- Derriana (1833)
- Derry (1833; 10th ed. 1847)
- Chapters on Flowers (London, 1836)
- Conformity: a Tale (London, 1841)
- Helen Fleetwood (London, 1841)
- Falsehood and Truth (Liverpool, 1841)
- Personal Recollections (London, 1841)
- Dangers and Duties (London, 1841)
- Judah's Lion (London, 1843)
- The Wrongs of Woman, in four parts (London, 1843–4)
- The Church Visible in all Ages (London, 1844)
- Judea Capta: an Historical Sketch of the Destruction of Jerusalem by the Romans (London, 1845)
- Works of Charlotte Elizabeth (with introduction by Mrs. H. B. Stowe, 2nd edit. New York, 1845)
- Protection; or, the Candle and the Dog (Lane & Tippett, 1846)
- Bible Characteristics (London, 1851)
- War with the Saints (London, 1852)
- Short Stories for Children (Dublin, 1854)
- Tales and Illustrations (Dublin, 1854)
- Stories from the Bible (London, 1861)
- Charlotte Elizabeth's Stories (collected, New York, 1868)
- Kindness to Animals: or, The Sin of Cruelty Exposed and Rebuked (Philadelphia: American Sunday-School Union, 1845) (available online)
- Little Oaths (New York: American Tract Society, 18--?)(available online)
- Patty; or, Beware of Meddling (Sunday-School Union of the Methodist Episcopal Church, 18--?)(available online)
- Richard and Rover (New York: Lane & Tippett for the Sunday-School Union of the Methodist Episcopal Church, 1846)(available online)
- The Bible The Best Book (New York: American Tract Society, 185-?)(available online)
- The Burying-ground (N.Y. American Tract Society, 185-?)
- The Newfoundland fisherman: a true story (N.Y. American Tract Society, 18--?)
- Personal Recollections (London: R. B. Seeley & W. Burnside, 1841)
- The Perils of the Nation: An Appeal to the Legislature, The Clergy, and the Higher and Middle Classes (London: Seeley, Burnside and Seeley, 1843)
