= Rosia, Sovicille =

Rosia
- Frazione
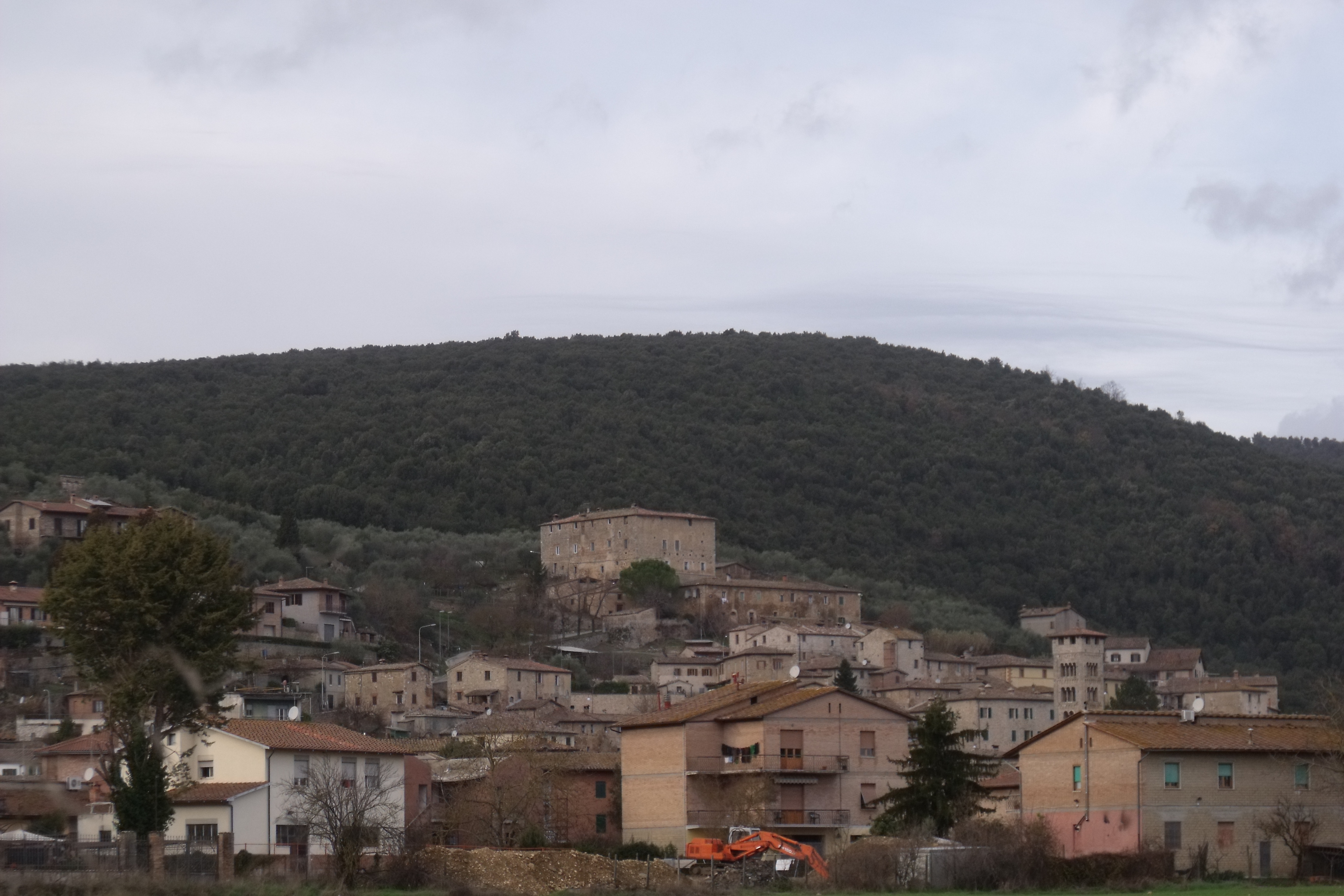
- View of Rosia

- Location of Rosia in Italy
- Coordinates: 43°14′51″N 11°13′25″E
- Country: Italy
- Region: Tuscany
- Province: Siena (SI)
- Comune: Sovicille
- Elevation: 205 m (673 ft)

Population (2011)
  - Total: 2,573
- Demonym: Rosiani
- Time zone: UTC+1 (CET)
  - Summer (DST): UTC+2 (CEST)

Rosia is a village in Tuscany, central Italy, administratively a frazione of the comune of Sovicille, province of Siena. At the time of the 2001 census its population was 1,833.
