= Lewis Hippolytus Joseph Tonna =

English polyglot and campaigner

Lewis Hippolytus Joseph Tonna (3 September 1812 – 2 April 1857) was an English polyglot and campaigner on behalf of evangelical protestantism. He served as a secretary of the Royal United Services Institution and had antiquarian and numismatic interests.

== Life and work ==
Born in Liverpool, son of the Spanish vice-consul and consul for the Kingdom of the Two Sicilies, his father died in 1828 while he was a student in Corfu and he was compelled to find employment as an interpreter aboard the Hydra. His mother was the daughter of H.S. Blanckley consul-general in the Balearic Islands. He served as interpreter and 'acting schoolmaster' on various ships until returning to England in 1835. A period of employment aboard the Britannia brought him in contact wit Sir Pulteney Malcolm who helped him obtain a position as acting director and later secretary of the Royal United Services Institute.

Tonna was married to Charlotte Elizabeth Browne, widow of Captain George Phelan, in 1841 and the two were prolific pamphleteers for the evangelical Protestant cause. When Giacinto Achilli was interned following the fall of the Roman Republic, Tonna was prominent in the campaign for his release and return to England. Following Charlotte's death in 1846, in 1848 he married Mary Anne Dibdin, daughter of Charles Dibdin (the younger). Neither marriage produced children and Tonna died in London.

Tonna wrote several small books and pamphlets including Erchomena, or Things to Come (1847), Nuns and Nunneries: Sketches compiled entirely from Romish Authorities (1852), The Real Dr. Achilli: a few more words with Cardinal Wiseman (1850), and added a biographical memoir in the third edition of the book by his first wife Life of Charlotte Elizabeth (1848).

== Honours ==
- Fellow of the Society of Antiquaries;
- Fellow of the Royal Geographical Society (1855).

== Bibliography ==
- Gilley, S. (2004) "Achilli, (Giovanni) Giacinto (b. c.1803)", Oxford Dictionary of National Biography, Oxford University Press, accessed 22 July 2007 (subscription required)
- Laughton, J. K. (2004) "Tonna, Lewis Hippolytus Joseph (1812–1857)", rev. Stephen Gregory, Oxford Dictionary of National Biography, Oxford University Press, accessed 23 July 2007 (subscription required)
- Lewis, D. M., ed. (1995). The Blackwell Dictionary of Evangelical Biography, 1730–1860 (2 vols. ed.).
