= Brenna, Tuscany =

Brenna
- Frazione
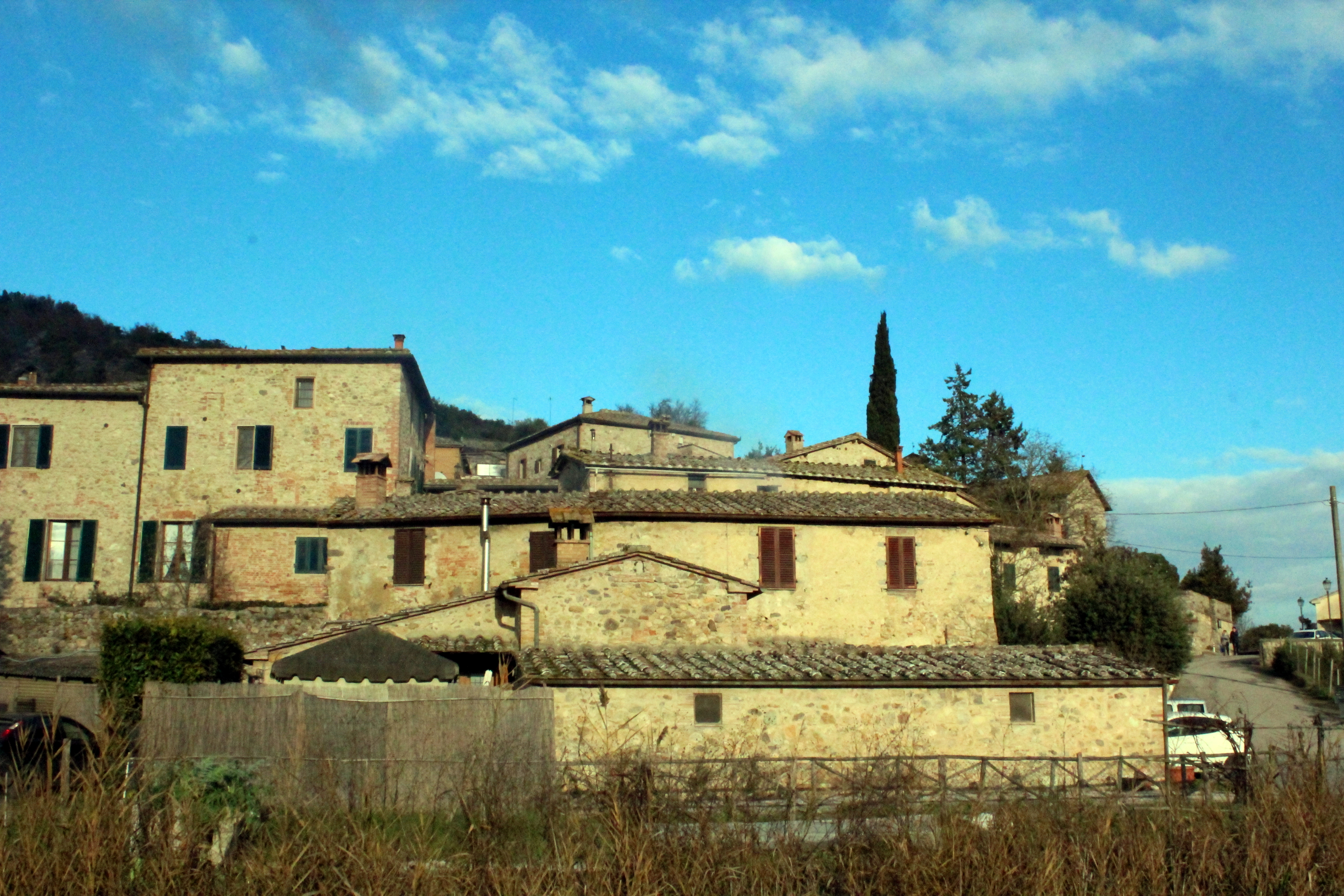
- View of Brenna

- Location of Brenna in Italy
- Coordinates: 43°12′10″N 11°13′57″E
- Country: Italy
- Region: Tuscany
- Province: Siena (SI)
- Comune: Sovicille
- Elevation: 194 m (636 ft)

Population (2011)
  - Total: 187
- Demonym: Brennini
- Time zone: UTC+1 (CET)
  - Summer (DST): UTC+2 (CEST)

Brenna is a village in Tuscany, central Italy, administratively a frazione of the comune of Sovicille, province of Siena. At the time of the 2001 census its population was 148.
