= Bioconversion of biomass to mixed alcohol fuels =

Biochemical process

The bioconversion of biomass to mixed alcohol fuels can be accomplished using the MixAlco process. Through bioconversion of biomass to a mixed alcohol fuel, more energy from the biomass will end up as liquid fuels than in converting biomass to ethanol by yeast fermentation.

The process involves a biological/chemical method for converting any biodegradable material (e.g., urban wastes, such as municipal solid waste, biodegradable waste, and sewage sludge, agricultural residues such as corn stover, sugarcane bagasse, cotton gin trash, manure) into useful chemicals, such as carboxylic acids (e.g., acetic, propionic, butyric acid), ketones (e.g., acetone, methyl ethyl ketone, diethyl ketone) and biofuels, such as a mixture of primary alcohols (e.g., ethanol, propanol, n-butanol) and/or a mixture of secondary alcohols (e.g., isopropanol, 2-butanol, 3-pentanol). Because of the many products that can be economically produced, this process is a true biorefinery.

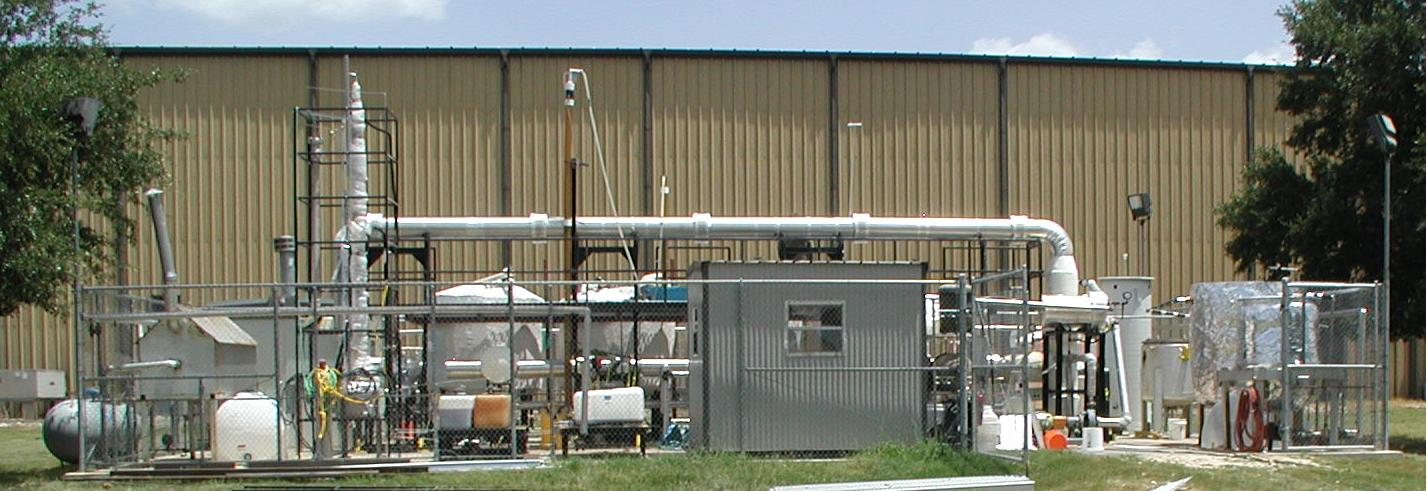
Pilot Plant (College Station, Texas)

The process uses a mixed culture of naturally occurring microorganisms found in natural habitats such as the rumen of cattle, termite guts, and marine and terrestrial swamps to anaerobically digest biomass into a mixture of carboxylic acids produced during the acidogenic and acetogenic stages of anaerobic digestion, however with the inhibition of the methanogenic final stage. The more popular methods for production of ethanol and cellulosic ethanol use enzymes that must be isolated first to be added to the biomass and thus convert the starch or cellulose into simple sugars, followed then by yeast fermentation into ethanol. This process does not need the addition of such enzymes as these microorganisms make their own.

As the microorganisms anaerobically digest the biomass and convert it into a mixture of carboxylic acids, the pH must be controlled. This is done by the addition of a buffering agent (e.g., ammonium bicarbonate, calcium carbonate), thus yielding a mixture of carboxylate salts. Methanogenesis, being the natural final stage of anaerobic digestion, is inhibited by the presence of the ammonium ions or by the addition of an inhibitor (e.g., iodoform). The resulting fermentation broth contains the produced carboxylate salts that must be dewatered. This is achieved efficiently by vapor-compression evaporation. Further chemical refining of the dewatered fermentation broth may then take place depending on the final chemical or biofuel product desired.

The condensed distilled water from the vapor-compression evaporation system is recycled back to the fermentation. On the other hand, if raw sewage or other waste water with high BOD in need of treatment is used as the water for the fermentation, the condensed distilled water from the evaporation can be recycled back to the city or to the original source of the high-BOD waste water. Thus, this process can also serve as a water treatment facility, while producing valuable chemicals or biofuels.

Because the system uses a mixed culture of microorganisms, besides not needing any enzyme addition, the fermentation requires no sterility or aseptic conditions, making this front step in the process more economical than in more popular methods for the production of cellulosic ethanol. These savings in the front end of the process, where volumes are large, allows flexibility for further chemical transformations after dewatering, where volumes are small.

== Carboxylic acids ==
Carboxylic acids can be regenerated from the carboxylate salts using a process known as "acid springing". This process makes use of a high-molecular-weight tertiary amine (e.g., trioctylamine), which is switched with the cation (e.g., ammonium or calcium). The resulting amine carboxylate can then be thermally decomposed into the amine itself, which is recycled, and the corresponding carboxylic acid. In this way, theoretically, no chemicals are consumed or wastes produced during this step.

== Ketones ==
There are two methods for making ketones. The first one consists on thermally converting calcium carboxylate salts into the corresponding ketones. This was a common method for making acetone from calcium acetate during World War I. The other method for making ketones consists on converting the vaporized carboxylic acids on a catalytic bed of zirconium oxide.

== Alcohols ==
=== Primary alcohols ===
The undigested residue from the fermentation may be used in gasification to make hydrogen (H_{2}). This H_{2} can then be used to hydrogenolyze the esters over a catalyst (e.g., copper chromite), which are produced by esterifying either the ammonium carboxylate salts (e.g., ammonium acetate, propionate, butyrate) or the carboxylic acids (e.g., acetic, propionic, butyric acid) with a high-molecular-weight alcohol (e.g., hexanol, heptanol). From the hydrogenolysis, the final products are the high-molecular-weight alcohol, which is recycled back to the esterification, and the corresponding primary alcohols (e.g., ethanol, propanol, butanol).

=== Secondary alcohols ===
The secondary alcohols (e.g., isopropanol, 2-butanol, 3-pentanol) are obtained by hydrogenating over a catalyst (e.g., Raney nickel) the corresponding ketones (e.g., acetone, methyl ethyl ketone, diethyl ketone).

== Drop-in biofuels ==
The primary or secondary alcohols obtained as described above may undergo conversion to drop-in biofuels, fuels which are compatible with current fossil fuel infrastructure such as biogasoline, green diesel and bio-jet fuel. Such is done by subjecting the alcohols to dehydration followed by oligomerization using zeolite catalysts in a manner similar to the methanex process, which used to produce gasoline from methanol in New Zealand.

== Acetic acid versus ethanol ==
Cellulosic-ethanol manufacturing plants are bound to be net exporters of electricity because a large portion of the lignocellulosic biomass, namely lignin, remains undigested and it must be burned, thus producing electricity for the plant and excess electricity for the grid. As the market grows and this technology becomes more widespread, coupling the liquid fuel and the electricity markets will become more and more difficult.

Acetic acid, unlike ethanol, is biologically produced from simple sugars without the production of carbon dioxide:

C_{6}H_{12}O_{6} → 2 CH_{3}CH_{2}OH + 2 CO_{2}
(Biological production of ethanol)
C_{6}H_{12}O_{6} → 3 CH_{3}COOH
(Biological production of acetic acid)

Because of this, on a mass basis, the yields will be higher than in ethanol fermentation. If then, the undigested residue (mostly lignin) is used to produce hydrogen by gasification, it is ensured that more energy from the biomass will end up as liquid fuels rather than excess heat/electricity.

3 CH_{3}COOH + 6 H_{2} → 3 CH_{3}CH_{2}OH + 3 H_{2}O
(Hydrogenation of acetic acid)
C_{6}H_{12}O_{6} (from cellulose) + 6 H_{2} (from lignin) → 3 CH_{3}CH_{2}OH + 3 H_{2}O
(Overall reaction)

A more comprehensive description of the economics of each of the fuels is given on the pages alcohol fuel and ethanol fuel, more information about the economics of various systems can be found on the central page biofuel.

== Stage of development ==
The system has been in development since 1991, moving from the laboratory scale (10 g/day) to the pilot scale (200 lb/day) in 2001. A small demonstration-scale plant (5 ton/day) has been constructed and is under operation and a 220 ton/day demonstration plant is expected in 2012.

== See also ==
- Anaerobic digestion
- Bioreactor
- Mechanical biological treatment
