= Tora =

Tora or TORA may refer to:

== People ==
- Tora (given name), female given name
- Tora (surname)
- Tora people of Arabia and northern Africa
- Torá language, an extinct language once spoken in Brazil
- Tora (Darfur), a semi-legendary culture in Sudan

== Places ==
- Tora, Benin, in Borgou Department
- Tora, Burkina Faso, a village
- Tora, Odisha, a village in Bargarh District, India
- Torà, Catalonia, Spain, a town and municipality
- Tora (river), Tuscany, Italy
- Tora, Egypt, an ancient Egyptian quarry and modern town
  - Tura Prison

== Entertainment ==
- Tora (film), an Assamese children's film
- Tora San, the main character in the Japanese film series Otoko wa Tsurai yo
- Tora, a character from the anime film Dragon Ball Z: Bardock – The Father of Goku
- Tora, a main character in the manga Ushio and Tora
- Ice, also known as Tora Olafsdotter, a DC Comics superheroine
- Tora, a character in the NES version of Teenage Mutant Ninja Turtles: The Arcade Game
- Tora, a main character in Xenoblade Chronicles 2

== Music ==
- Tora (band), an Australian electronic group
- Tora (Anna Vissi album), a 1988 album by Greek singer Anna Vissi
- Tora (Chrispa album), a 2003 album by Greek singer Chrispa
- "Tora", a 2012 single by Greek singer Sakis Rouvas

== Computing ==
- Temporally-ordered routing algorithm, for routing data across wireless mesh network or mobile ad hoc networks
- TOra, a database administration and development tool

== Other uses ==
- Tora (moth), a genus of moths
- Tora hartebeest, a species of antelope
- Runway#TORA (takeoff run available), the length of runway declared available and suitable for the ground run of an airplane taking off
- Battle of Torà (1003), a victory of an alliance of Catalan counts over the Caliphate of Córdoba
- Cyclone Oratia, called Tora in Norway, a 2000 European windstorm

== See also ==
- Tola (disambiguation)
- Tora Tora Tora (disambiguation)
- Tora Tora, a hard rock band formed in 1985
- "Tora! Tora!", a song by rock band Van Halen from their 1980 album Women and Children First
- Torah, the Five Books of Moses
- Tova (disambiguation)
