= TOA =

TOA or Toa may refer to:

== Companies ==
- TOA Corporation, an electronics company of Kobe, Japan
- TOA Construction Corporation, or Tōa Kensetsu Kōgyō, a general contractor construction firm of Tokyo, Japan
- TOA Technologies, a field service management company in the United States acquired by Oracle in 2014

== Entertainment ==
- Tales of the Abyss, a console role-playing game
- Tanoai Reed (born 1974, stage name Toa), American stuntman and actor
- Toa, a fictional race of beings in the now discontinued Bionicle franchise produced as constructible toys by Lego

== Places ==
- The One Academy, an art college in Malaysia
- Toa river, a river in Cuba
- Zamperini Field (IATA airport code), in Torrance, California, US

== Science and technology ==
- TOA, a mnemonic in trigonometry
- Tornado watch (SAME code), a statement issued by weather forecasting agencies
- Tubo-ovarian abscess, an infection of the ovary and fallopian tube
- Type of Activity, a classification defined in the Australian and New Zealand Standard Research Classification
- Trioctylamine, an organic compound
- Time of arrival, of a radio signal reaching a receiver

== Other uses ==
- Table of authorities, in law
- Toas, Aboriginal artifacts

== See also ==
- Cuchillas del Toa, a biosphere reserve in Cuba
- Ngāti Toa, a Māori tribe
- Toa-kai, a Yakuza syndicate based in Tokyo, Japan
- Tola (disambiguation)
- Tova (disambiguation)
- Thoa (disambiguation)
