= Tomești =

Tomeşti may refer to several places in Romania:

- Tomești, Harghita, a commune in Harghita County
- Tomești, Hunedoara, a commune in Hunedoara County
- Tomești, Iași, a commune in Iași County
- Tomești, Timiș, a commune in Timiș County
- Tomeşti, a village in Mogoș Commune, Alba County
- Tomeşti, a village in Pogana Commune, Vaslui County

== See also ==
- Toma (name)
- Tomeștii Noi and Tomeștii Vechi, villages in Balatina Commune, Glodeni District, Moldova
- Tomulești (disambiguation)
