= Tomulești =

Tomuleşti may refer to several villages in Romania:

- Tomuleşti, a village in Poienarii de Argeș Commune, Argeș County
- Tomuleşti, a village in Toporu Commune, Giurgiu County

== See also ==
- Toma (name)
- Tomești (disambiguation)
