= Tola (name) =

Tola is a given name and surname. The given name is a variant of Toni. Notable people who use this name include the following:

== Given name ==
- Tola (biblical figure), Biblical judge of Israel
- Tola, Biblical son of Issachar from the Old Testament
- Tola, co-founder with husband Orca of the Abbey at Abbotsbury, England in the 11th Century
- Tola of Clonard, a saint in the Irish tradition
- Tola Kasali (born 1950), Nigerian politician
- Tola Mankiewiczówna (1900 – 1985), Polish singer and actress
- Tola Szlagowska (born 1992), Polish singer
- Tola, stagename of Carlos Mario Gallego, Columbian journalist and cartoonist of Tola y Maruja

== Surname ==
- Afrim Tola or Afrim Tole (born 1970), Albanian footballer
- Carlos Julio Arosemena Tola (1888 – 1952), Ecuadorian politician (former President)
- Efisio Tola (1803 – 1833), Italian patriot
- Erjon Tola (born 1986), Albanian alpine ski racer
- Fate Tola (born 1987), Ethiopian long-distance runner
- Helen Bekele Tola (born 1994), Ethiopian long-distance runner
- Heng Tola, Cambodian film director and producer
- Kejsi Tola (born 1992), Albanian singer and the winner of Albanian Idol 2007
- Kore Tola (born 1997), Ethiopian middle-distance runner
- Mercedes González Tola (1860–1911), Ecuadorian poet and playwright
- Meseret Belete Tola (born 1999), Ethiopian long-distance runner
- Meseret Defar Tola (born 1983), Ethiopian long-distance runner
- Mirjam Tola (born 1972), Albanian operatic soprano
- Nub Tola (born 1995), Cambodian footballer
- Pamela Tola (1981), Finnish actress
- Pasquale Tola (1800–1874), Italian judge, politician and historian
- Roberto Tola (born 1966), Italian jazz guitarist and composer
- Shura Kitata Tola (born 1996), Ethiopian long-distance runner
- Tamirat Tola (born 1991), Ethiopian long-distance runner
- Tadese Tola (born 1987), Ethiopian long-distance runner
- Tesfaye Tola (born 1974), Ethiopian long-distance runner
- Virginia Tola (born 1976), Argentine operatic soprano
- Workenesh Tola (born 1980), Ethiopian long-distance runner
- Wut Tola (born 2002), Cambodian footballer
- Zenebech Tola, birthname of Maryam Yusuf Jamal (born 1984), Ethiopian-born Bahraini middle-distance runner

== Nickname ==
- Tola Vologe, nickname of Anatole Vologe (1909 – 1944), French field hockey player

== Middle name ==
- Sandra Tola Casañas birthname of Sandra Tola Harvey whose stage name was Sandée (1962 – 2008), American vocalist
- José Tola Pasquel (1914 – 1999), Peruvian engineer

== In fiction ==
- Tola, an oppressive chimpanzee and brother to the heroic Brynn, on the 2017 video game Planet of the Apes: Last Frontier.
- Tola, a female character in Bolek & Lolek.
- Tola Martins, a character in the 2024 TV series Iwájú.

== See also ==
- Girma Tolla (born 1975), Ethiopian long-distance runner
- Tona (name)
- Tova
- Tala (name)
- Toda (surname)
- Tol (surname)
- Tolga (given name)
- Tolo (surname)
- Toma (name)
- Tora (given name)
- Tora (surname)
