= Torá =

Torá may refer to:

- Torá language, an extinct language of Brazil
- Torà, known in Spanish as Torá, a town in Catalonia, Spain
- Torah, in Judaism

== See also ==
- Tora (disambiguation)
