= Tove =

- Pronunciation: toːvə
- Gender: Female

Origin
- Meaning: Beloved, Beautiful
- Region of origin: Scandinavia

Other names
- Variant forms: Tovah, Tova

Tove is a Scandinavian given name that derives from the Old Norse name Tófa or from the Old Norse name Þórfríðr, which combines Thor with "fríðr".

== Origins ==
Some believe the name to be a shortening of Þorfríðr, whose elements are the deity-name Thor and Old Norse fríðr 'beautiful'. Tófa and Tófi appear to have been relatively popular names in the 10th and 11th centuries and are found in Anglo-Scandinavian court witness lists and later in the Domesday Book in their Latinised form. The personal name became a surname in medieval England, with spellings of Tovi, Tovie (16th century) and Tovey recorded in wills and church documents.

== Notable women ==
- Tove of the Obotrites, 10th-century Wendish princess
- Tove Alexandersson, Swedish orienteer
- Tove Almqvist (born 1996), Swedish football midfielder
- Tove Ditlevsen, Danish poet and author
- Tove Edfeldt, Swedish actress
- Tove Fergo, Danish vicar and politician
- Tove Jansson, Finnish artist and author
- Tove Lindbo Larsen, Danish politician
- Tove Lo, Swedish singer
- Tove Midelfart, Norwegian lawyer and businesswoman
- Tove Maës, Danish actress
- Tove Nilsen, Norwegian writer
- Tove Nielsen, Danish politician
- Tove Skutnabb-Kangas (1940–2023), Finnish linguist and educator
- Tove Styrke, Swedish singer
- Birte Tove (1945–2016), Danish actress and nude model

== Notable men ==
- Tove (sculptor), 12th-century Scanian sculptor

== Fictional characters ==
- a legendary young woman, mistress of the Danish King Waldemar, and subject of a poem by Jens Peter Jacobsen best known for its musical setting as the Gurre-Lieder of Arnold Schoenberg
- a fictional, slithy creature created by Lewis Carroll that appears in his poem Jabberwocky

== See also ==
- High Tove, a mountain in the English Lake District
- River Tove, tributary of the Great Ouse in England
- TOVE Project, an ontology for modelling enterprises
- Tove (film), a 2020 biopic about Tove Jansson
- Tova (disambiguation)
