= E85 =

Fuel blend of 85% ethanol and 15% another liquid

Logo used in the United States for E85 fuel

E85 is an abbreviation typically referring to an ethanol fuel blend of 85% ethanol fuel and 15% gasoline or other hydrocarbon by volume.

In the United States, the exact ratio of fuel ethanol to hydrocarbon may vary according to ASTM 5798 that specifies the allowable ethanol content in E85 as ranging from 51% to 83%. This is due to the lower heating value of neat ethanol making it difficult to start engines in relatively cold climates without pre-heating air intake, faster cranking, or mixing varying fractions of gasoline according to climate. Cold starting in cold climates is the primary reason ethanol fuel is blended with any gasoline fraction.

In Brazil, ethanol fuel is neat at the pumps, hence flexible-fuel vehicles (FFV) including trucks, tractors, motorbikes and mopeds run on E100. The 85% fraction is commonly sold at pumps worldwide (outside the US), and when specifically supplied or sold as E85 is always 85% ethanol (at pumps or in barrel). Having a guaranteed ethanol fraction obviates the need for a vehicle system to calculate best engine tune accordingly to maximise performance and economy.

In countries like Australia where E85 is always 85% ethanol (and pump fuel with varying fractions is called "flex fuel"), performance motoring enthusiasts and motor racing clubs/championships use E85 extensively (without the need for any FFV certification). Use of alcohol (ethanol and methanol) in motor racing history parallels the invention of the automobile, favoured due to inherent combustion characteristics such as high thermal efficiency, high octane rating, raised torque and with some advanced engines, better specific fuel consumption. In the United States, government subsidies of ethanol in general and E85 in particular have encouraged a growing infrastructure for the retail sale of E85, especially in corn growing states in the Midwest.

== Fuel economy ==
=== Specific fuel consumption ===
E85 promoters and the Society of Automotive Engineers contend that automotive manufacturers currently fail to equal the fuel consumption of gasoline because they fail to take advantages of characteristics which are superior in ethanol-based fuel blends. They claim that some ethanol engines have already produced 22% more miles per gallon than identical gasoline engines.

Ethanol advocates also state that it is a mistake to base ethanol engine design on gasoline engine design, and that ethanol engines should be based on diesel engine design parameters instead. Using this approach, the EPA has produced an ethanol-only engine which achieves much higher brake thermal efficiency levels than gasoline engines achieve. Mileage is dependent upon the composition of the ethanol-gasoline blend, transmission, state of engine tune (primarily fuel-air mixture, spark timing and compression ratio). In the United States to offset this difference in fuel consumption in vehicles not optimised for ethanol, legislation has been passed to subsidize its cost.

=== Energy value ===
In contrast, ethanol critics contest the benefits of E85 by focusing on the fact that E85 has 33% lower heating value compared to the higher heating value of gasoline. However comparing energy expressed as a value of heat does not reflect the total work from an Otto Cycle. As energy content does not factor certain latent or specific heat values, nor combustion pressure, looking at heat alone in the combustion equation does not determine efficiency or work according to the laws of thermodynamics.

== Octane and performance ==
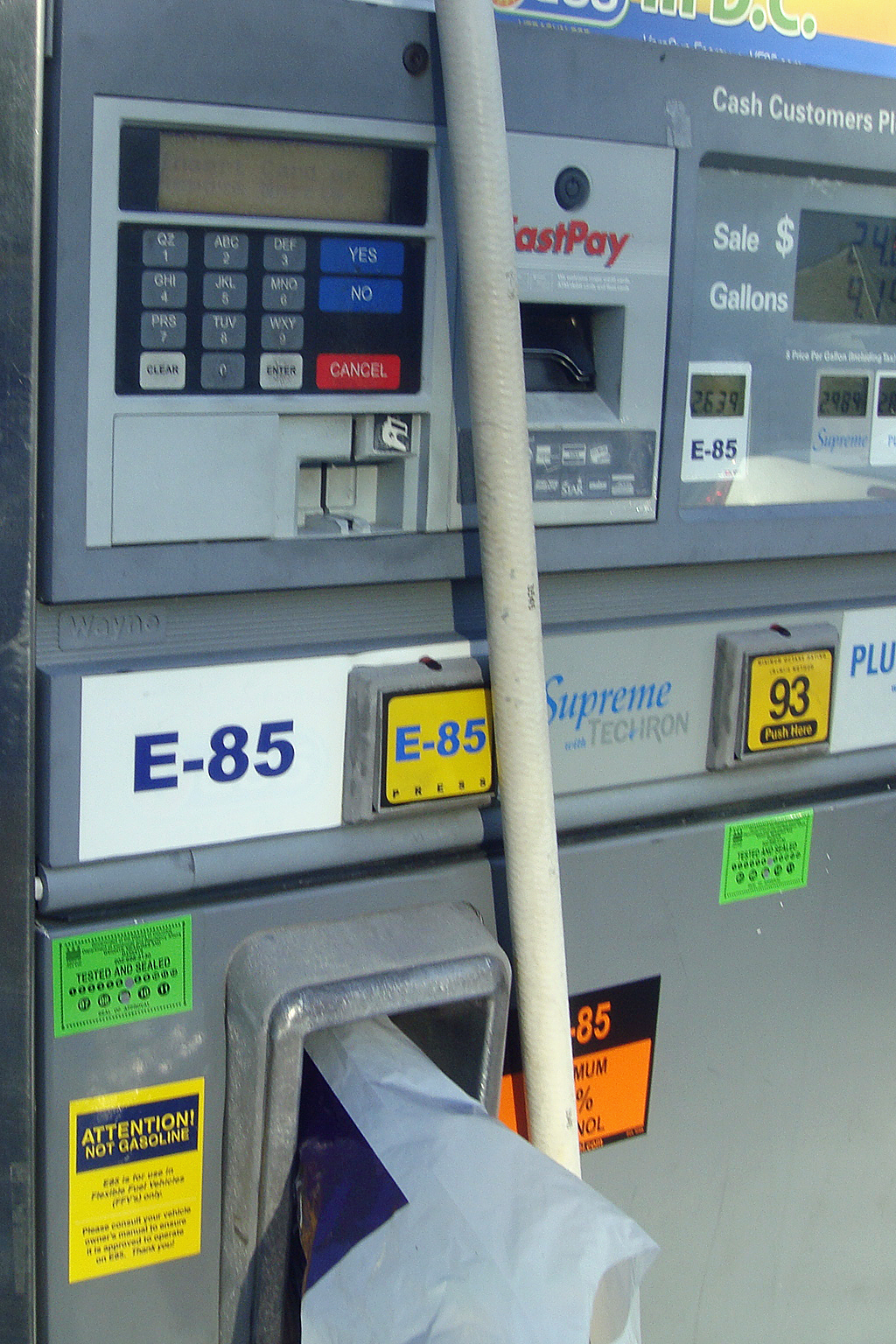
E85 fuel dispenser at a regular gasoline station

=== Use in flexible-fuel vehicles ===
E85 ethanol is used in engines modified to accept higher concentrations of ethanol. In the US such FFVs are designed to run on any mixture of gasoline or ethanol up to 85% ethanol, whereas in countries such as Brazil where the climate is typically warmer, FFVs run on neat alcohol. There are a few major differences between FFVs and non-FFVs. One is the elimination of bare magnesium, aluminum, and rubber parts in the fuel system. Fuel injection control systems have a wider range of pulse widths to inject up to 34% more fuel (which in turn produces more power). Stainless steel fuel lines, sometimes lined with plastic, and stainless-steel fuel tanks in place of terne (tinplate) fuel tanks have been used. In some cases, FFVs use specific engine oil that neutralises acidity. For vehicles with in-tank-mounted fuel pumps, precautions to prevent arcing, as well as flame arrestors positioned in the tank's fill pipe, are sometimes used.

=== Octane rating ===
As more effort is put into maximizing an engine to take advantage of E85's higher octane rating, engines achieve greater power advantages. One car that has higher power on ethanol is the Koenigsegg CCXR, which on ethanol is the fifth-most powerful production car, with 20% more horsepower on E85 than on gasoline. According to the manufacturer, this is due to the cooling properties of ethanol. E85 has an octane rating higher than that of regular gasoline's typical rating of 87, or premium gasoline's 91-93. This allows it to be used in higher-compression engines, which tend to produce more power per unit of displacement than their gasoline counterparts. Examples of octane mis-citation can be found at the Iowa Renewable Fuels Association titled "E85 Facts" which cites a range of 100-105, and a document at the Texas State Energy Conservation Office titled "Ethanol", which cites a 113 rating.

Some vehicles can be converted to use E85 despite not being specifically built for it. As the lower heating value E85 has a cooler intake charge—which, coupled with its high stability level from its high octane rating—has also been used as a "power adder" in turbocharged performance vehicles. These modifications have not only resulted in lower GHG emissions, but typically resulted in 10-12% power and torque increase at the wheels. Where the engine was previously knock limited by gasoline, power improvements are as high as 40%.

Due to its low price and high availability in certain areas people have started to turn to using it in place of high-end racing fuels, which typically cost over US$10.00/gal.

== Emissions ==
There are four primary types of pollutants scientists study. These emissions are hydrocarbons (HC), oxides of nitrogen (NO_{x}), carbon monoxide (CO) and carbon dioxide (CO_{2}). As E85 is predominantly ethanol, the exhaust emissions are very different from those of regular gasoline. Numerous studies have compared and contrasted the different emissions and the effects these emissions have on the environment, but the tests have been inconclusive. The tests have shown very little consistency if any at all because there are too many variables involved. The make and model of the vehicle, the way in which the ethanol was produced and the vehicle's overall fuel efficiency all play a large role in the overall outcome of each study. To address the problem of inaccuracy, engineers at the National Renewable Energy Laboratory combined data from all applicable emissions studies and compiled them into one data set. This compiled set of data showed that on average all emissions that are federally regulated showed a decrease or no statistically relevant difference between E85 and gasoline.

EPA's stringent tier-II vehicle emission standards require that FFVs achieve the same low emissions level regardless whether E85 or gasoline is used. However, E85 can further reduce emissions of certain pollutants as compared to conventional gasoline or lower-volume ethanol blends. For example, E85 is less volatile than gasoline or low-volume ethanol blends, which results in fewer evaporative emissions. Using E85 also reduces carbon-monoxide emissions and provides significant reductions in emissions of many harmful toxics, including benzene, a known human carcinogen. However, E85 in certain engine operating conditions may increase emissions of acetaldehyde. EPA is conducting additional analysis to expand our understanding of the emissions impacts of E85.

== Controversy ==
=== Economics ===
A study by Purdue University found that the economic benefit of E85 is highly dependent on the price of crude oil.

=== Food vs. fuel ===
E85 critics contend that production of ethanol from corn (maize) drives up world food prices, causing corn to be unaffordable or even unavailable. E85 advocates counter that concern by pointing out that over 93% of all corn grown in the United States is never fed directly to people, but is instead used as livestock feed. Corn used to produce ethanol contains a high amount of starch and is not easily digestible by humans, like sweet corn. American farmers grow more corn than people purchase; there is an annual surplus of corn in the U.S.

E85 advocates say that corn prices have increased due to manipulation of the commodities markets and because American corn companies sell more and more US-grown corn to Mexico and China, creating more competition for corn buyers, and therefore driving up its price. E85 critics contend that ethanol producers may not reduce carbon emissions due to the petroleum and natural gas used in raising corn and refining it. E85 advocates reply by pointing to ethanol producers who do not do so, but instead use E85 or biodiesel fuel to transport E85, and use biomass as a heat source for the distillation of ethanol instead of petro-products like natural gas.

Some say that cellulosic ethanol produced from waste materials or fast growing non-food crops such as switchgrass is much more beneficial, but not yet economically practical at large scale. Others say that the world can easily replace all of its use of petroleum by simply making ethanol from the many crops that yield more ethanol per acre than corn yields, with existing technology, not future technology, and that certain elements in the cellulosic ethanol field are more interested in patent rights than in producing the greatest amount of ethanol at the lowest price point.

== Availability and price ==
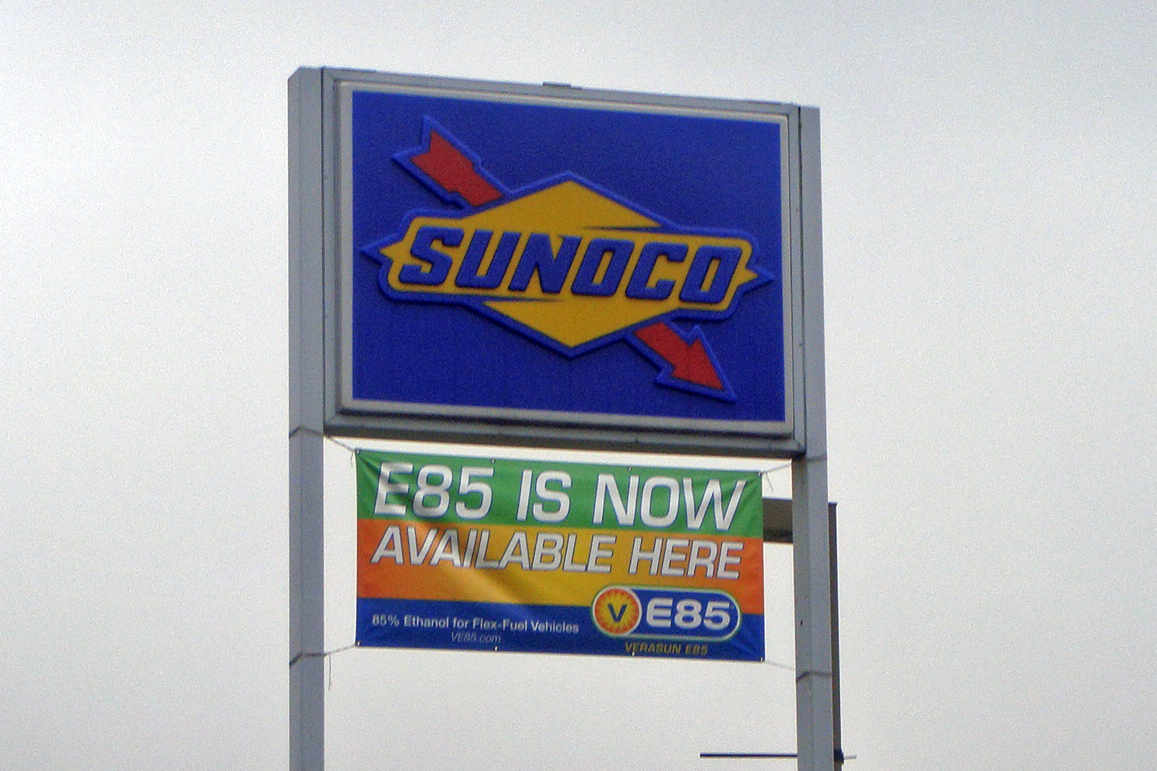
Opening of an E85 retail pump in Maryland

E85 is increasingly common in the United States, mainly in the Midwest where corn is a major crop and is the primary source material for ethanol-fuel production. As of July 1, 2014, there were more than 3,300 fuel stations that offered E85 fuel. E85 as a fuel is widely used in Sweden; however, most of it is imported from Italy and Brazil. E85 was formerly available from the Maxol chain in Ireland, where it was made from whey, a byproduct of cheese manufacturing. The availability ended in 2011, due to a severe excise-duty hike which rendered it economically unviable. In Finland E85 is available from 52 St1 chain locations and 71 ABC chain locations. The E85 sold by St1 is labeled as RE85 and as "Eko E85" in ABC-stations to indicate it is manufactured from Finnish bio-waste. By way of international price comparison, in the Cook Islands as with many of the Pacific Islands, cost of producing 100% ethanol from coconut biomass is a fraction of obtaining fossil fuels. In France, about 30% of gas stations supply E85, or about 2,725 stations, and the number of flex-fuel kits installed doubled in 2021 to 30,000 kits from the previous year. E85 was launched in the United Kingdom on March 14 2006 by the Morrisons supermarket chain. The Morrisons branch in Norwich was the first forecourt to introduce E85. Take-up however was very low and E85 is now only available at a small number of outlets.

== US price regulation ==
The American Jobs Creation Act of 2004 created the Volumetric Ethanol Excise Tax Credit (VEETC) to subsidize production costs. The 2008 Farm Bill reduced the VEETC's 51-cent tax credit to 45 cents. Other measures taken by Congress to jump start ethanol production include the 2004 VEETC bill, which provided for a Small Ethanol Producer Tax Credit which gave tax credits to small ethanol producers. More recently, the Tax Relief Act, Unemployment Insurance Reauthorization Act, and Job Creation Act of 2010 extended the tax cuts allowed by VEETC from the end of 2010 to the end of 2012. In the United States, to realize equivalent fuel economy at the pump with an FFV, the price of E85 must be much lower than gasoline. E85 was at least 20% less expensive in most areas as recently as 2011. In one US test, a 2007 Chevy Tahoe FFV averaged 18.3 MPG (U.S. gallons) for gasoline and 13.5 MPG for E85, 26.5% worse than gasoline. However, in Australia, where Holden has sold more than 70,000 FFVs since 2010, the difference in combined consumption on similar V8 variants in a family sedan is between 10% and 20%. In 2010, the cost of fuel in the US averaged US$3.42, while the cost for E85 averaged US$3.09, or 90% of the cost of gasoline. In another test, however, a fleet of Ford Tauruses averaged only about 6% fewer miles per gallon in ethanol-based vehicles when compared to traditional, gas-powered Tauruses.

== See also ==
- Alcohol fuel
- Earth's atmosphere
- Lambda sensor – also known as an oxygen sensor, used to measure lean versus rich combustion conditions
- Methanol – wood alcohol, not to be confused with ethanol (grain alcohol)
- Timeline of alcohol fuel
