= Tova (disambiguation) =

Tova may refer to:

- Tova, name
- Test of Variables of Attention (T.O.V.A.), a neuropsychological assessment

== See also ==
- Shana tova, a Rosh Hashanah greeting
- "Shanah Tova" (song), Hebrew children's song
- Mita Tova, Hebrew name for The Farewell Party, 2014 Israeli film
- TOA (disambiguation)
- Toba (disambiguation)
- Toga (disambiguation)
- Toka (disambiguation)
- Tola (disambiguation)
- Toma (disambiguation)
- Tora (disambiguation)
- Tovar (disambiguation)
- Tove (disambiguation)
- Toya (disambiguation)
- Towa (disambiguation)
