= Thora =

Thora may refer to:

- Thora, New South Wales
- 299 Thora, main belt asteroid
- Tora (given name), people named Tora and Thora
