= Toyah =

Toyah may refer to:

- Toyah Willcox, a singer, actress, and TV presenter, often referred to by her first name only
- Toyah (band), the pop group fronted by Toyah Willcox between 1977 and 1983
- Toyah, Texas, a town in Texas, USA
- Toyah Battersby, a character in Coronation Street

== See also ==
- Toya (disambiguation)
