= Toma =

Toma or TOMA may refer to:

== Places ==
- Toma, Burkina Faso, a town in Nayala province
- Toma Department, a department in Nayala province
- Toma, Banwa, Burkina Faso, a town
- Tōma, Hokkaidō, Japan, a town
  - Tōma Station, its railway station
- Toma, a town in East New Britain, Papua New Guinea

== People ==
- Toma (name), list of people with this name
- Loma people or Toma, an ethnic group from border region between Guinea and Liberia
  - Loma language
- ToMa, Croatian singer

== Music and television ==
- Toma (TV series), an American series
- "Toma" (song), by rapper Pitbull
- "Toma" (song), by artist Puscifer
- "Toma" (song), by artist Ivy Queen

== Other uses ==
- La Toma, a 1598 assertion of Spanish possession of land north of Rio Grande
- Siege of Toma, a military action in 1914 in German New Guinea
- Texas Open Meetings Act
- Theatre Orchestra Musicians Association (TOMA), part of the Media, Entertainment and Arts Alliance, Australia
- Tōma, Kendo term for "long distance"
- Toma cheese, Italian cheese
- Top of mind awareness, a marketing term
- TOMA (vehicle), armored vehicle against riots
- TOMA (Caldas da Rainha), municipal bus service in city of west central Portugal

== See also ==
- Tova (disambiguation)
