= Thoa =

Thoa may refer to:

- Gnetum or Thoa, a genus of gymnosperms
- Halecium or Thoa, a genus of hydrozoans
- Canis lupaster (African wolf)
- Lycaon pictus (African wild dog)
- Río de la Plata (Puerto Rico) (Taíno: thoa), a river

== See also ==
- TOA (disambiguation)
