= Toda =

Toda may refer to:

- Toda people
- Toda language
- Toda Embroidery
- Toda lattice
- Toda field theory
- Oscillator Toda
- Toda (surname), a Japanese surname
- "Toda" (song), a song by Alex Rose and Rauw Alejandro
- Queen Toda of Navarre (fl. 885–970)
- Toda, Saitama, Japan
- Toda bracket
- Toda fibration
- Takeoff Distance Available, see Runway#Declared distances
- Theatre of Digital Art, Dubai, UAE
- Todaraisingh, or Toda, a municipality in Rajasthan, India
