= Tora Tora Tora =

Tora Tora Tora may refer to:

- Tora! Tora! Tora!, a 1970 Japanese-American war film
- Tora Tora Tora (album), a 1995 EP by the Melvins
- "Tora Tora Tora" (song), a 1994 song by Domino
- "Tora! Tora! Tora!", a 1981 song by Depeche Mode from the album Speak & Spell

== See also ==
- Tora (disambiguation)
- Tora Tora
