= Brief (law) =

Legal document

A brief (Old French from Latin brevis, "short") is a written legal document used in various legal adversarial systems that is presented to a court arguing why one party to a particular case should prevail.

In England and Wales (and other Commonwealth countries, e.g., Australia) the phrase refers to the papers given to a barrister when they are instructed.

== Language ==
Pre-trial briefs are exchanged between parties at a date set during the pre-trial conference to argue matters under consideration before trial.
Trial briefs are presented at trial to resolve a disputed point of evidence.
Legal briefs are used as part of arguing a pre-trial motion in a case or proceeding.

Merit briefs (or briefs on the merits) are briefs on the inherent rights and wrongs of a case, absent any emotional or technical biases
Amicus briefs are briefs filed by persons not directly party to the case. These are often groups that have a direct interest in the outcome.

Appellate briefs are briefs that occur at the appeal stage.
Memorandum of law may be another word for brief, although that term may also be used to describe an internal document in a law firm in which an attorney attempts to analyze a client's legal position without arguing for a specific interpretation of the law.
IRAC case briefs are usually a one-page review done by a paralegal or attorney, ultimately used by the attorney to find previously decided cases by an appellate court, in state or federal jurisdiction, which show how the courts have ruled on earlier similar cases in court.

== Function ==
The brief or memorandum establishes the legal argument for the party, explaining why the reviewing court should affirm or reverse the lower court's judgment based on legal precedent and citations to the controlling cases or statutory law. To achieve these ends, the brief must appeal to the accepted forces such as statutory law or precedent, but may also include policy arguments and social statistics when appropriate. For example, if the law is vague or broad enough to allow the appellate judge some discretion in his decision making, an exploration of the consequences of the possible decision outside of legal formalism may provide guidance. Such arguments may also support a legal argument when the purpose of the law at issue may be clear, but the particular application of that law in service of that purpose is in dispute.

== Procedure ==
The party filing the appeal – called the petitioner or appellant, who is attempting to convince the appellate court to overturn the lower court decision – is responsible for submitting his brief first. The responding party – the respondent or appellee, who is satisfied with the lower decision – then files a reply brief within a specified time. Depending on the local rules of procedure, the court may allow or even require the parties to then file additional replies to the opposing party's briefs, multiplying the back-and-forth responses of the parties. Depending on local rules, the court may then decide the case purely based on the submitted briefs or may hear oral argument by the parties.

== England ==
Upon a barrister devolves the duty of taking charge of a case when it comes into court, but all the preliminary work, such as the drawing up of the case, serving papers, marshalling evidence, etc., is performed by a solicitor. The delivery of a brief to counsel gives him authority to act for his client in all matters which the litigation involves.

The brief was probably so called from its first being only a copy of the original writ.

=== Contents ===
A brief contains a concise summary for the information of counsel of the case which the barrister has to plead, with all material facts in chronological order, and frequently such observations thereon as the solicitor may think fit to make, the names of witnesses, with the "proofs," that is, the nature of the evidence which each witness is ready to give, if called upon. The brief may also contain suggestions for the use of counsel when cross-examining witnesses called by the other side. Accompanying the brief may be copies of the pleadings, and of all documents material to the case. The brief is always endorsed with the title of the court in which the action is to be tried, with the title of the action, and the names of the counsel and of the solicitor who delivers the brief. Counsel's fee is also marked. The result of the action is noted on the brief by counsel, or if the action is compromised, the terms of the compromise are endorsed on each brief and signed by the leading counsel on the opposite side.

=== Brief bag ===
The brief-bag, in which counsel's papers are carried to and from court, now forms an integral part of a barrister's outfit, although today it is used primarily to carry counsel's robes. In the early part of the 19th century the possession of a brief-bag was strictly confined to those who had received one from a king's counsel (silk). King's Counsel were then few in number, were considered officers of the court, and had a salary of £40 a year, with a supply of paper, pens and purple bags. These bags they distributed among rising juniors of their acquaintance, whose bundles of briefs were getting inconveniently large to be carried in their hands. These perquisites were abolished in 1830.

Brief-bags are now either blue or red. Blue bags are those with which barristers provide themselves when first called, and, in some jurisdictions, it is a breach of etiquette to let this bag be visible in court. The only brief-bag allowed to be placed on the desks is the red bag, which by English legal etiquette is given by a leading counsel to a junior as a reward for excellence in some important case. This is still viewed as one of the great traditions of the bar. The red bag is embroidered with the junior barrister's initials and a handwritten note of thanks is usually placed inside the bag. In many jurisdictions, the receipt of a red bag from a silk is seen as a rite of passage for a junior barrister.

The use of such special bags eventually led to the briefcase.

=== Ecclesiastical ===
In English ecclesiastical law a brief meant letters patent issued out of chancery to churchwardens or other officers for the collection of money for church purposes. Such briefs were regulated by a statute of 1704, but are now obsolete, though they are still to be found named in one of the rubrics in the Communion service of the Book of Common Prayer.

== United States ==
In the United States, the word differs in meaning from its English counterpart because attorneys in the United States exercise all the functions distributed in England between barristers and solicitors. A lawyer sometimes prepares for his own use what is called a "trial brief" for use at the trial. This corresponds in all essential particulars with the "brief" prepared by the solicitor in England for the use of counsel.

But the more distinctive use of the term in America is in the case of the brief "in error or appeal," before an appellate court. This is a written or printed document, varying according to circumstances, but embodying the argument on the question affected. Most of the appellate courts require the filing of printed briefs for the use of the court and opposing counsel at a time designated for each side before hearing. In the rules of the United States Supreme Court and circuit courts of appeals the brief is required to contain a concise statement of the case, a specification of errors relied on, including the substance of evidence, the admission or rejection of which is to be reviewed, or any extract from a charge excepted to, and an argument exhibiting clearly the points of law or fact to be discussed. This form of brief, it may be added, is also adopted for use at the trial in certain states of the Union which require printed briefs to be delivered to the court.

=== Contents ===
In American courts, the brief typically has the following parts: a table of contents; a table of authorities listing the cases, statutes, and regulations that are cited; a presentation of the issues under review by the court, usually in only one sentence if possible; a statement of the case that presents the relevant facts and the previous history of the case in the lower courts; a summary of the legal standard of review that the appellate court should use in evaluating the decision of the lower court; a summary of the party's argument; and the full discussion of the legal and/or policy arguments explaining why the party believes it should win the case, which will be the most lengthy portion of the brief. The brief may also be accompanied by an appendix that includes copies of the lower court opinions and other documents or court opinions cited in the brief. The particular required format of briefs is a matter of local court procedural rules.

== Elsewhere ==
In Scotland a brief is called a memorial and in Canada it is called a factum. In Australia the tradition regarding briefs is almost identical to England, except that the use of brief bags is relatively uncommon. In Dutch and German, the word brief refers to a regular letter.

== Professional vs. student briefs ==
In North American law schools, students usually study historical cases by "briefing" them. Law school briefs are shorter than court briefs but follow a similar structure: presentation of issue, presentation of facts, presentation of legal and policy arguments and presentation of outcome. In the United States, the practice of briefing cases for study began at Harvard Law School in the fall of 1870 with the introduction of the case method of teaching by Professor Christopher Columbus Langdell. Case briefing is a widely accepted pedagogical method among law professors today.

== IRAC case briefing ==
IRAC is an abbreviation of Issue, Rule, Analysis (or some say Application), Conclusion.

When a potential client has an interview with an attorney and tells of the legal problem, the attorney, or office paralegal, will review prior case law to find out if the client does indeed have a problem that has legal remedy.

The formation of each case brief follows the same pattern: Facts, Issue, Rule, Analysis, Impact. A case brief may also include a dissent or concurrence if there is either in the particular case. The facts should include the important information from the case, and should also include the procedural history before it makes it to the supreme court. The issue statement should always be in the form of a question that will be answered in the rule section.

Some schools prefer students to list the Facts, Issue, Holding, and Reasoning.

== See also ==
- Amicus curiae brief
