= Energy content of biofuel =

The energy content of biofuel is the chemical energy contained in a given biofuel, measured per unit mass of that fuel, as specific energy, or per unit of volume of the fuel, as energy density. A biofuel is a fuel produced from recently living organisms. Biofuels include bioethanol, an alcohol made by fermentation—often used as a gasoline additive, and biodiesel, which is usually used as a diesel additive. Specific energy is energy per unit mass, which is used to describe the chemical energy content of a fuel, expressed in SI units as joule per kilogram (J/kg) or equivalent units. Energy density is the amount of chemical energy per unit volume of the fuel, expressed in SI units as joule per litre (J/L) or equivalent units.

== Energy and CO_{2} output of common biofuels ==
The table below includes entries for popular substances already used for their energy, or being discussed for such use.

The second column shows specific energy, the energy content in megajoules per unit of mass in kilograms, useful in understanding the energy that can be extracted from the fuel.

The third column in the table lists energy density, the energy content per liter of volume, which is useful for understanding the space needed for storing the fuel.

The final two columns deal with the carbon footprint of the fuel. The fourth column contains the proportion of CO_{2} released when the fuel is converted for energy, with respect to its starting mass, and the fifth column lists the energy produced per kilogram of CO_{2} produced. As a guideline, a higher number in this column is better for the environment. But these numbers do not account for other green house gases released during burning, production, storage, or shipping. For example, methane may have hidden environmental costs that are not reflected in the table.

Fuel type	Specific energy (MJ/kg)	Energy Density (MJ/L)	CO_{2} Gas made from Fuel Used (kg/kg) (Note: While all CO_{2} gas output ratios are calculated to within a less than 1% margin of error(assuming total oxidation of the carbon content of fuel), ratios preceded by a Tilde (~) indicate a margin of error of up to (but no greater than) 9%. Ratios listed do not include emissions from fuel plant cultivation/Mining, purification/refining and transportation. Fuel availability is typically 74–84.3% NET from source Energy Balance.)	Energy per CO_{2} (MJ/kg)
Solid Fuels
Bagasse (Cane Stalks)	9.6		~+40%(C_{6}H_{10}O_{5})_{n}+15% (C_{26}H_{42}O_{21})_{n}+15% (C_{9}H_{10}O_{2})_{n}1.30	7.41
Chaff (Seed Casings)	14.6		[Please insert average composition here]	
Animal Dung/Manure	10– 15		[Please insert average composition here]	
Dried plants (C_{6}H_{10}O_{5})_{n}	10–16	1.6–16.64	IF 50%(C_{6}H_{10}O_{5})_{n}+25% (C_{26}H_{42}O_{21})_{n}+25% (C_{10}H_{12}O_{3})_{n}1.84	5.44-8.70
Wood fuel (C_{6}H_{10}O_{5})_{n}	16–21	2.56–21.84	IF 45%(C_{6}H_{10}O_{5})_{n}+25% (C_{26}H_{42}O_{21})_{n}+30% (C_{10}H_{12}O_{3})_{n}1.88	8.51–11.17
Charcoal	30	5.4–6.6	85–98% Carbon+VOC+Ash 3.63	8.27
Liquid Fuels
Pyrolysis oil	17.5	21.35	varies	varies
Methanol (CH_{3}-OH)	19.9–22.7	15.9	1.37	14.49–16.53
Ethanol (CH_{3}-CH_{2}-OH)	23.4–26.8	18.4–21.2	1.91	12.25–14.03
Ecalene	28.4	22.7	75%C_{2}H_{6}O+9%C_{3}H_{8}O+7%C_{4}H_{10}O+5%C_{5}H_{12}O+4%Hx 2.03	14.02
Butanol (CH_{3}-(CH_{2})_{3}-OH)	36	29.2	2.37	15.16
Fat	37.656	31.68	C_{55}H_{104}O_{6}	
Biodiesel	37.8	33.3–35.7	~2.85	~13.26
Sunflower oil (C_{18}H_{32}O_{2})	39.49	33.18	(12% (C_{16}H_{32}O_{2})+16% (C_{18}H_{34}O_{2})+71% (LA)+1% (ALA))2.81	14.04
Castor oil (C_{18}H_{34}O_{3})	39.5	33.21	(1% PA+1% SA+89.5% ROA+3% OA+4.2% LA+0.3% ALA)2.67	14.80
Olive oil (C_{18}H_{34}O_{2})	39.25–39.82	33–33.48	(15% (C_{16}H_{32}O_{2})+75% (C_{18}H_{34}O_{2})+9% (LA)+1% (ALA))2.80	14.03
Gaseous Fuels
Methane (CH_{4})	55–55.7	(Liquefied) 23.0–23.3	(Methane leak exerts 23 × greenhouse effect of CO_{2}) 2.74	20.05–20.30
Hydrogen (H_{2})	120–142	(Liquefied) 8.5–10.1	(Hydrogen leak slightly catalyzes ozone depletion) 0.0	
Fossil Fuels (comparison)
Coal	29.3–33.5	39.85–74.43	(Not Counting: CO, NO_{x}, Sulfates & Particulates) ~3.59	~8.16–9.33
Crude Oil	41.868	28–31.4	(Not Counting: CO, NO_{x}, Sulfates & Particulates) ~3.4	~12.31
Gasoline	45–48.3	32–34.8	(Not Counting: CO, NO_{x}, Sulfates & Particulates) ~3.30	~13.64–14.64
Diesel	48.1	40.3	(Not Counting: CO, NO_{x}, Sulfates & Particulates) ~3.4	~14.15
Natural Gas	38–50	(Liquefied) 25.5–28.7	(Ethane, Propane & Butane Not Counting: CO, NO_{x} & Sulfates) ~3.00	~12.67–16.67
Ethane (CH_{3}-CH_{3})	51.9	(Liquefied) ~24.0	2.93	17.71
Nuclear fuels (comparison) (Note: While Uranium-235 (^{235}U) fission produces no CO_{2} gas directly, the indirect fossil fuel burning processes of Mining, Milling, Refining, Moving & Radioactive waste disposal, etc. of intermediate to low-grade uranium ore concentrations produces some amount of carbon dioxide. Studies vary as to how much carbon dioxide is emitted. The United Nations Intergovernmental Panel on Climate Change reports that nuclear produces approximately 40 g of CO_{2} per kilowatt hour (11 g/MJ, equivalent to 90 MJ/kg CO_{2}e). A meta-analysis of a number of studies of nuclear CO_{2} lifecycle emissions by academic Benjamin K. Sovacool finds nuclear on average produces 66 g of CO_{2} per kilowatt hour (18.3 g/MJ, equivalent to 55 MJ/kg CO_{2}e). One Australian professor claims that nuclear power produces the equivalent CO_{2} gas emissions per MJ of net-output-energy of a Natural Gas fired power station. Prof. Mark Diesendorf, Inst. of Environmental Studies, UNSW.)
Uranium -235 (^{235}U)	77,000,000	(Pure)1,470,700,000	[Greater for lower ore conc.(Mining, Refining, Moving)] 0.0	~55 – ~90
Nuclear fusion (^{2}H -^{3}H)	300,000,000	(Liquefied)53,414,377.6	(Sea-Bed Hydrogen-Isotope Mining-Method Dependent) 0.0	
Fuel Cell Energy Storage (comparison)
Direct Methanol	4.5466	3.6	~1.37	~3.31
Proton-Exchange (R&D)	up to 5.68	up to 4.5	(IFF Fuel is recycled) 0.0	
Sodium Hydride (R&D)	up to 11.13	up to 10.24	(Bladder for Sodium Oxide Recycling) 0.0	
Battery Energy Storage (comparison)
Lead–acid battery	0.108	~0.1	(200–600 Deep-Cycle Tolerance) 0.0	
Nickel–iron battery	0.0487–0.1127	0.0658–0.1772	(<40y Life)(2k–3k Cycle Tolerance IF no Memory effect) 0.0	
Nickel–cadmium battery	0.162–0.288	~0.24	(1k–1.5k Cycle Tolerance IF no Memory effect) 0.0	
Nickel–metal hydride	0.22–0.324	0.36	(300–500 Cycle Tolerance IF no Memory effect) 0.0	
Super-iron battery	0.33	(1.5 * NiMH) 0.54	(~300 Deep-Cycle Tolerance) 0.0	
Zinc–air battery	0.396–0.72	0.5924–0.8442	(Recyclable by Smelting & Remixing, not Recharging) 0.0	
Lithium-ion battery	0.54–0.72	0.9–1.9	(3–5 y Life) (500-1k Deep-Cycle Tolerance) 0.0	
Lithium-Ion-Polymer	0.65–0.87	(1.2 * Li-Ion)1.08–2.28	(3–5 y Life) (300–500 Deep-Cycle Tolerance) 0.0	
Lithium iron phosphate battery				
DURACELL Zinc–Air	1.0584–1.5912	5.148–6.3216	(1–3 y Shelf-life) (Recyclable not Rechargeable) 0.0	
Aluminium battery	1.8–4.788	7.56	(10–30 y Life) (3k+ Deep-Cycle Tolerance) 0.0	
PolyPlusBC Li-Aircell	3.6–32.4	3.6–17.64	(May be Rechargeable)(Might leak sulfates) 0.0	

== Yields of common crops associated with biofuels production ==
Crop	Oil (kg/ha)	Oil (L/ha)	Oil (lb/acre)	Oil (US gal/acre)	Oil per seeds (Note: Typical oil extraction from 100 kg of oil seeds) (kg/100 kg)	Melting Range (°C)			Iodine number	Cetane number
Crop	Oil (kg/ha)	Oil (L/ha)	Oil (lb/acre)	Oil (US gal/acre)	Oil per seeds (kg/100 kg)	Oil / Fat	Methyl Ester	Ethyl Ester	Iodine number	Cetane number
Groundnut					(Kernel)42					
Copra					62					
Tallow						35–42	16	12	40–60	75
Lard						32–36	14	10	60–70	65
Corn (maize)	145	172	129	18		-5	-10	-12	115–124	53
Cashew nut	148	176	132	19						
Oats	183	217	163	23						
Lupine	195	232	175	25						
Kenaf	230	273	205	29						
Calendula	256	305	229	33						
Cotton	273	325	244	35	(Seed)13	-1 – 0	-5	-8	100–115	55
Hemp	305	363	272	39						
Soybean	375	446	335	48	14	-16 – -12	-10	-12	125–140	53
Coffee	386	459	345	49						
Linseed (flax)	402	478	359	51		-24			178	
Hazelnuts	405	482	362	51						
Euphorbia	440	524	393	56						
Pumpkin seed	449	534	401	57						
Coriander	450	536	402	57						
Mustard seed	481	572	430	61	35					
Camelina	490	583	438	62						
Sesame	585	696	522	74	50					
Safflower	655	779	585	83						
Rice	696	828	622	88						
Tung oil tree	790	940	705	100		-2.5			168	
Sunflowers	800	952	714	102	32	-18 – -17	-12	-14	125–135	52
Cocoa (cacao)	863	1,026	771	110						
Peanuts	890	1,059	795	113		3			93	
Opium poppy	978	1,163	873	124						
Rapeseed	1,000	1,190	893	127	37	-10–5	-10–0	-12 – -2	97–115	55–58
Olives	1,019	1,212	910	129		-12 – -6	-6	-8	77–94	60
Castor beans	1,188	1,413	1,061	151	(Seed)50	-18			85	
Pecan nuts	1,505	1,791	1,344	191						
Jojoba	1,528	1,818	1,365	194						
Jatropha	1,590	1,892	1,420	202						
Macadamia nuts	1,887	2,246	1,685	240						
Brazil nuts	2,010	2,392	1,795	255						
Avocado	2,217	2,638	1,980	282						
Coconut	2,260	2,689	2,018	287		20–25	-9	-6	8–10	70
Chinese Tallow (Note: Chinese Tallow (Sapium sebiferum, or Tradica Sebifera) is also known as the "Popcorn Tree")		4,700		500						
Oil palm	5,000	5,950	4,465	635	20–(Kernal)36	20–40	-8–21	-8–18	12–95	65–85
Algae		95,000		10,000						
Crop	Oil (kg/ha)	Oil (L/ha)	Oil (lb/acre)	Oil (US gal/acre)	Oil per seeds (kg/100 kg)	Melting Range (°C)			Iodine number	Cetane number
Crop	Oil (kg/ha)	Oil (L/ha)	Oil (lb/acre)	Oil (US gal/acre)	Oil per seeds (kg/100 kg)	Oil / Fat	Methyl Ester	Ethyl Ester	Iodine number	Cetane number

== See also ==
- Eichhornia crassipes#Bioenergy
- Syngas
- Conversion of units
- Energy density
- Heat of combustion
