= Toda (surname) =

Toda (written: 戸田) is a Japanese surname. Notable people with the surname include:

- Erika Toda (born 1988), Japanese actress
- Hiroshi Toda (born 1928), Japanese mathematician
- Jōsei Toda (1900–1958), educator and peace activist
- Toda Katsushige (1557–1600), Japanese daimyō
- Toda Kazuaki (1542–1604), Japanese samurai
- Kazuyuki Toda (born 1977), Japanese football player
- Keiko Toda (born 1957), Japanese actress
- Morikazu Toda (1917–2010), Japanese physicist
- Naho Toda (born 1974), Japanese actress
- Natsuko Toda (born 1936), subtitles translator
- Noriko Toda (戸田 則子, born 1965), Japanese speed skater
- Toda Seigen (fl. 1519–1590), Japanese swordsman
- Seinosuke Toda (born 1959), computer scientist
- Tomojiro Toda (1946–2016), sumo wrestler

== See also ==
- Toda (disambiguation)
- Tola (name)
- Tona (name)
- Tonda (name)
- Tova
