= Toba =

Toba may refer to:

== Languages ==
- Toba Sur language, spoken in South America
- Batak Toba, spoken in Indonesia

== People ==
- Toba people, indigenous peoples of the Gran Chaco in South America
- Toba Batak people, a sub-ethnic group of Batak people from North Sumatra, Indonesia
- Tuoba (拓拔), an early name for a clan of the Xianbei people in ancient China
- Toba Sōjō (1053–1140), Japanese astronomer and artist-monk
- Emperor Toba, emperor of Japan
- Toba Spitzer, lesbian rabbi in Arizona, USA
- Andreas Toba (born 1990), German gymnast
- Mika Toba (born 1961), Japanese katazome dye artist
- Toshimasa Toba (born 1975), Japanese footballer
- Georgian Tobă (born 1989), Romanian footballer
- Petre Tobă (born 1964), Romanian politician

== Places ==
- Toba, an area in Northern Sumatra that is now included in the Toba Samosir Regency
  - Lake Toba, a lake in northern Sumatra, Indonesia, and site of the volcanic Toba eruption 75,000 years ago
  - Toba catastrophe theory, according to which modern human evolution was affected by the Toba eruption
- Toba, Mie, a city in Mie prefecture, Japan
- Toba (Nova Crnja), a village near Nova Crnja, Serbia
- Toba, Tibet
- Toba, Jhelum, a village in Pakistan
- Toba Tek Singh, a district city in Punjab, Pakistan
- La Toba, central Spain

== Other ==
- Crataegus × mordenensis 'Toba', cultivar of the Morden Hawthorn
- Japanese gunboat Toba of the 1930s–40s
- Month of Tobi, or Touba, the fifth month of the Coptic calendar
- Theatre Owners Booking Association (T.O.B.A.), a major black vaudeville circuit
- Tobă, a traditional Romanian sausage
- Torsion-Bar Antenna (TOBA), a proposed gravitational wave detector
- Istighfar, a form of repentance sometimes invoked by the word "Toba"
- Thoroughbred Owners and Breeders Association (TOBA), annually reviews/establishes grading for Thoroughbred horse races in North America

== See also ==
- Tova (disambiguation)
- Tobas, Bolivian dance
