= Toya =

Toya may refer to:

== Places ==
- Tōya, Hokkaidō, a former village in Abuta District, Iburi, Hokkaidō, Japan
- Tōyako, Hokkaidō, a town incorporating Tōya, Hokkaidō
  - Tōya Station (Tōyako), a railway station in Tōyako
- Lake Tōya, a volcanic lake in Hokkaidō, Japan
- Toya, Mali, a commune of the Kayes Region
- Toya, Tombouctou, a town of the Tombouctou Region of Mali

== People ==
- Toya (singer), born LaToya Rodriguez, American R&B singer
- Antonia "Toya" Carter, reality television star and ex-wife of rapper Lil Wayne
- Toya Nakamura (中村 桐耶; born 2000), Japanese footballer

== Fictional characters ==
- Toya Kinomoto, a character in Cardcaptor Sakura media
- Toya (YuYu Hakusho), a character in YuYu Hakusho media
- Characters in Hikaru no Go media:
  - Akira Toya
  - Toya Meijin
- Tohya Miho, a character in the Megatokyo universe
- Toya Aoyagi, a character in the game Hatsune Miku: Colorful Stage!
- Toya Rima, a character from the anime and manga series Vampire Knight
- Toya Todoroki (轟 燈矢), a character in the manga series My Hero Academia
- Touya Mochizuki, the protagonist of the novel series In Another World with My Smartphone
- Toya, title character in (and also title of) a Norwegian family movie from 1956

== Other uses ==
- Toya (company), a media and telecommunications company based in Łódź, Poland
- Toya (planthopper), a genus of planthoppers in the family Delphacidae

== See also ==
- Tiny and Toya, an American reality TV series
- Toyah (disambiguation)
- LaToya (disambiguation)
- Tova (disambiguation)
