= Tora (surname) =

Tora is the surname of:

- Apisai Tora (1934–2020), Fijian politician
- Bjarte Tørå (born 1953), Norwegian politician
- James Tora (born 1956), Solomon Islands politician
- Lia Torá (1907–1972), Brazilian dancer and film actress
- Mirco Di Tora (born 1986), Italian swimmer
- Semisi Tora (born 1979), Fijian rugby league player
- Summia Tora, Afghan activist

== See also ==
- Tora (disambiguation)
- Tora (given name)
- Tola (name)
- Tona (name)
- Tova
