= Tora people =

Ethnic group

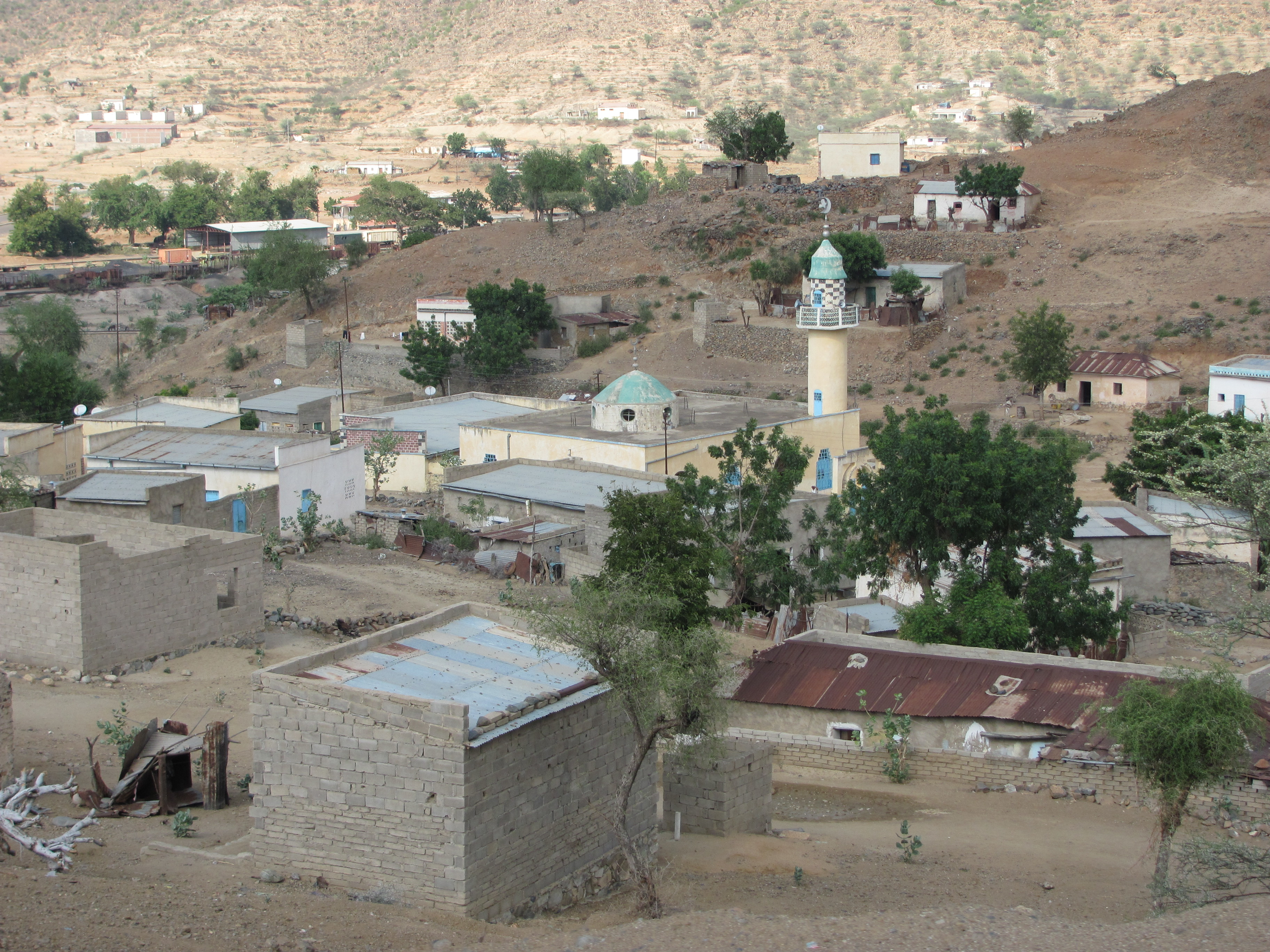
Ghinda Masjid (Mosque)

The forefathers of the Taroa people were two brothers Yazid and Zebed, descendants of Kerosh (Quraysh) and Manneja (Muawiyah), who lived in Arabia.

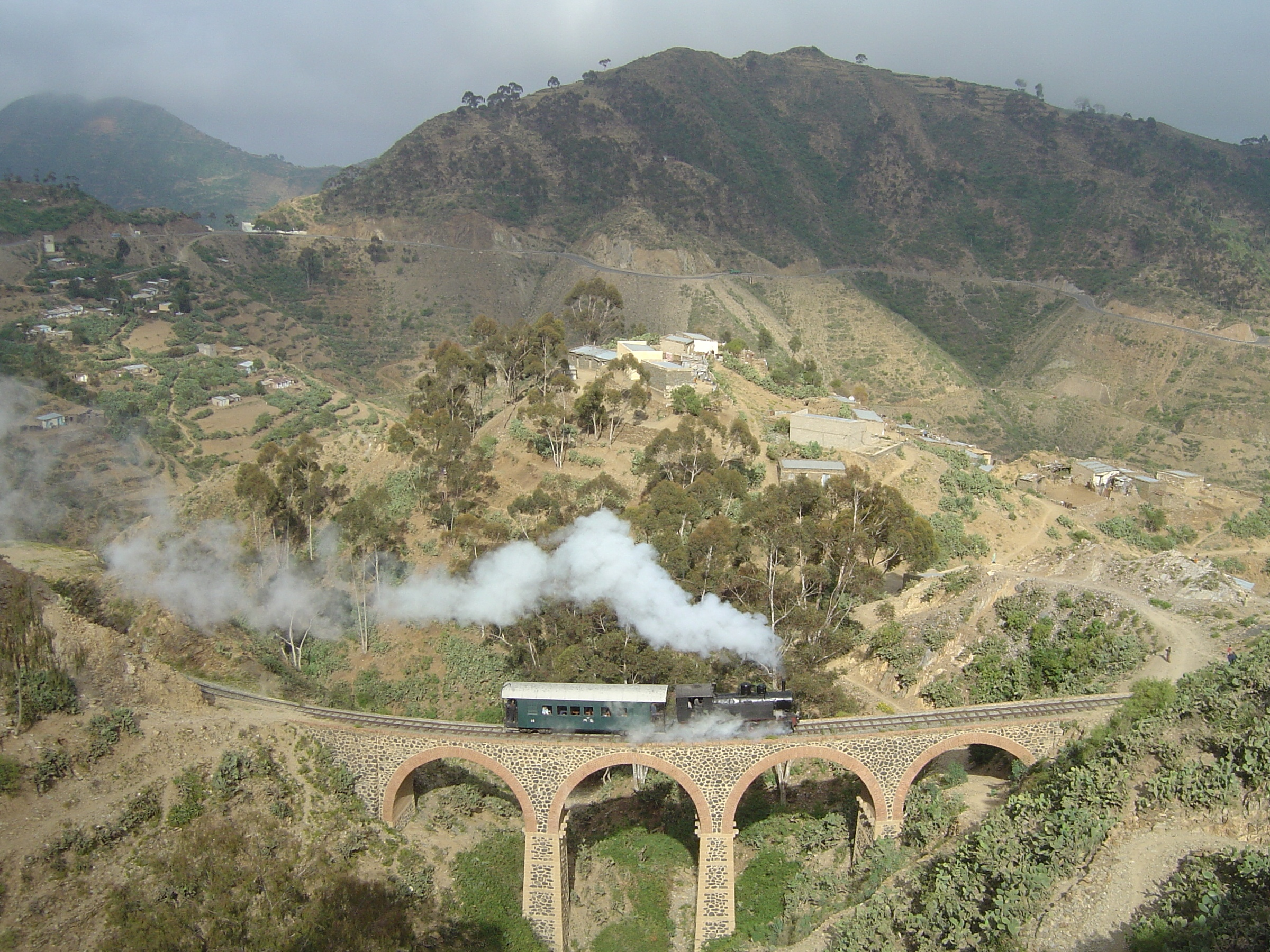

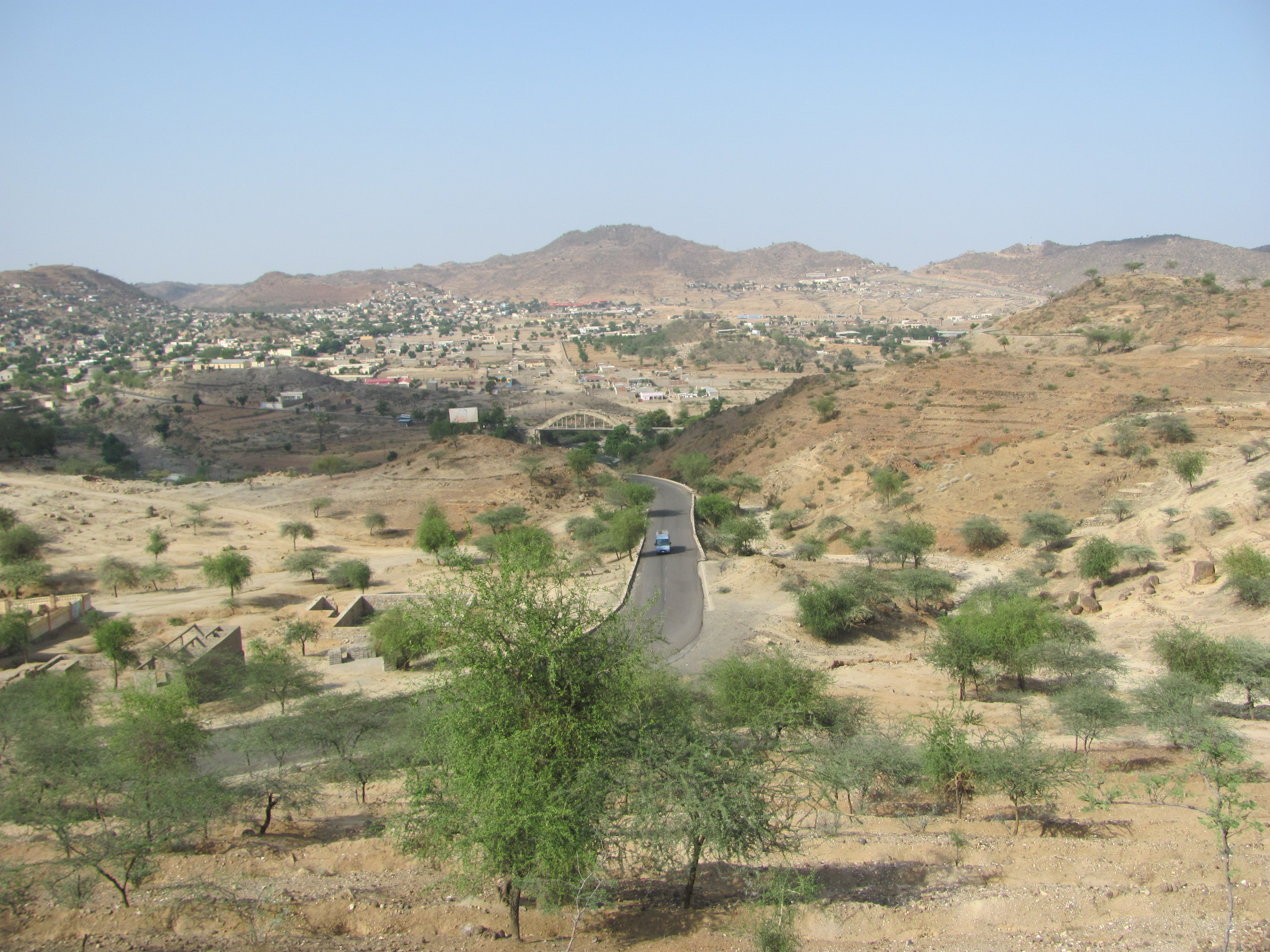

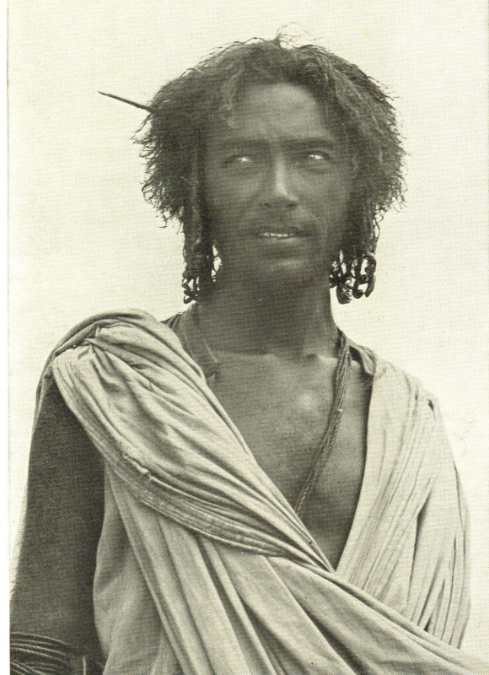
