= Tova =

Tova is a given name, nickname and a surname. The name Tova has multiple origins. Deriving from Old Norse, it is thought to be a hypocoristic form of the name Þórfríðr. Deriving from Hebrew, it is an adjective meaning "good".

Notable people with this name are listed below.

== Given name ==
- Saint Tova of Thorney (died c. 869 or 870), Anglo-Saxon martyr
- Tova of the Obotrites (fl. 970s ?), Slavic princess and queen consort of Denmark
- Tova Beck-Friedman (born 1938), American artist, sculptor, writer, filmmaker, and child survivor of the Holocaust
- Tova Ben-Dov, Israeli Zionist
- Tova Ben Zvi (1928–2020), Israeli singer
- Tova Borgnine (1941–2022), Norwegian-born American businesswoman
- Terri "Tovah" Feldshuh, American actress
- Tova Hamilton, Jamaican politician
- Tova Hartman (born 1957), Israeli scholar and social entrepreneur
- Tova Henderson (born 2004), Canadian ice hockey player
- Tova Ilan (1929–2019), Israeli educator and politician
- Tova Magnusson (born 1968), Swedish actress and filmmaker
- Tova Milo, Israeli computer scientist
- Tova Mirvis (born 1972), American novelist
- Tova O'Brien (born 1982/1983), New Zealand journalist, host of radio show Tova
- Tova Sanhadray (1906–1993), Israeli politician
- Tova Traesnaes (1941–2022), Norwegian-American businesswoman

== Surname ==
- Theresa Tova (born 1955), Canadian actress, singer and playwright

== Nickname ==
- Tosia Altman (1919–1943), Polish courier and smuggler, known as Tova
- Antun Stipančić (1949–1991), Croatian table tennis player

== Fictional characters ==
- Tiny Tova, character in The Magic Door
- Tova Arrocas, character in Internal Affairs (film)
- Tova, character in Critical Role
- Tova Sullivan, character in the book Remarkably Bright Creatures and its film adaptation (2026)

== See also ==
- Toda (surname)
- Tola (name)
- Toma (name)
- Tona (name)
- Tora (given name)
- Tora (surname)
- Tovar (surname)
