= Methanex =

Canadian methanol company

Methanex Corporation

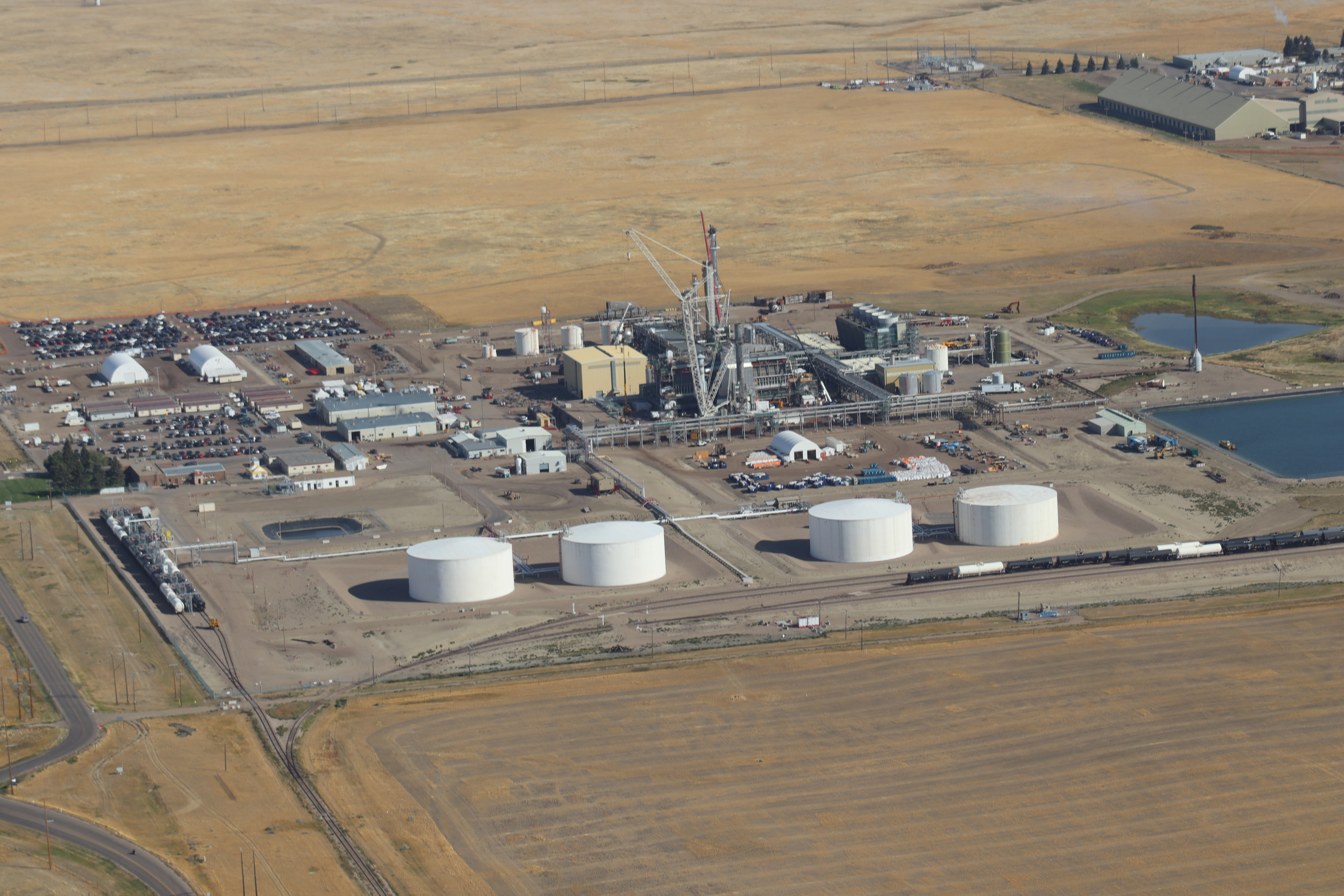
- Methanex facility in Medicine Hat, Alberta
- Type: Public
- Traded as: TSX: MX; Nasdaq: MEOH
- Industry: Methanol
- Headquarters: Vancouver, British Columbia, Canada
- Key people: Rich Sumner (CEO); Dean Richardson (CFO)
- Products: Methanol
- Subsidiaries: Waterfront Shipping Ltd.
- Website: methanex.com

Methanex Corporation is a Canadian company that supplies, distributes and markets methanol worldwide.

Methanex is the world’s largest producer and supplier of methanol to major international markets in North and South America, Europe, and Asia Pacific. Methanex is headquartered in Vancouver, British Columbia, Canada, and operates production sites in Canada, Chile, Egypt, New Zealand (at Motunui and Waitara Valley), the United States, and Trinidad and Tobago. Its global operations are supported by an extensive global supply chain of terminals, storage facilities and the world’s largest dedicated fleet of methanol ocean tankers.

Methanex Corporation challenged California's plan to eliminate methyl tertiary butyl ether (MTBE) from gasoline on grounds of water pollution prevention, claiming protection under Chapter 11 of NAFTA and demanding US$970 million in compensation from the state. The challenge was ultimately not successful and Methanex was ordered to reimburse the U.S. government $4 million in litigation costs.

In 2012, Methanex announced that it acquired land in Geismar, Louisiana, and that it would move one of its idle Chilean methanol plants there. Methanex confirmed that the reason was the low price of natural gas available in North America and Louisiana.

Regional marketing offices are located in Belgium, Chile, China, Egypt, Korea, Japan, the United Arab Emirates, the United Kingdom and the United States.

In 2026 Methanex announced that it will be effectively closing its plant in New Zealand.

== Waterfront Shipping Ltd. ==
Methanex's majority owned subsidiary, Waterfront Shipping Limited, is a global marine transportation company that operates a fleet of 30 ocean tankers. In 2016, the company announced the delivery of seven first Korean and Japanese built methanol-fueled ocean tankers. Methanex and Mitsui O.S.K. Lines announced plans for a strategic partnership in July 2021, resulting in MOL's purchase of a 40% stake in WFS.
