= Tora, Odisha =

Village in Odisha, India

Tora
- Village
- Location within Odisha Location within India
- Coordinates: 21°19′24″N 83°39′40″E
- Country: India
- State: Odisha
- District: Bargarh
- Tehsil: Bargarh

Government
  - Type: Gram Panchayat

Area
  - Total: 18.05 km^{2} (6.97 sq mi)
- Elevation: 170 m (560 ft)

Population (2011)
  - Total: 18,399
  - Density: 1,019/km^{2} (2,640/sq mi)

Languages
  - Official: Oriya
  - Other: Hindi
- Time zone: UTC+5:30 (IST)
- PIN: 768040
- STD code: 06646
- Vehicle registration: OD-17

Tora is a village in Bargarh Tehsil, Bargarh District, Odisha, India. It is located in the suburb of Bargarh, about 4 kilometres southeast of the city center. In 2011, it had a population of 18,399.

== Geography ==
Tora is located on the east of Jira River. It is connected to the Bargarh Bheden Canal Rd. The average elevation of the village is 170 metres above the sea level.

== Demographics ==
According to the 2011 Census of India, Tora contains 3,958 households. Among the 18,399 inhabitants, 9,809 are male and 8,590 are female. The overall literacy rate is 72.41%, with 7,822 of the male residents and 5,500 of the female residents being literate. Its census location code is 380607.
