= Tora (given name) =

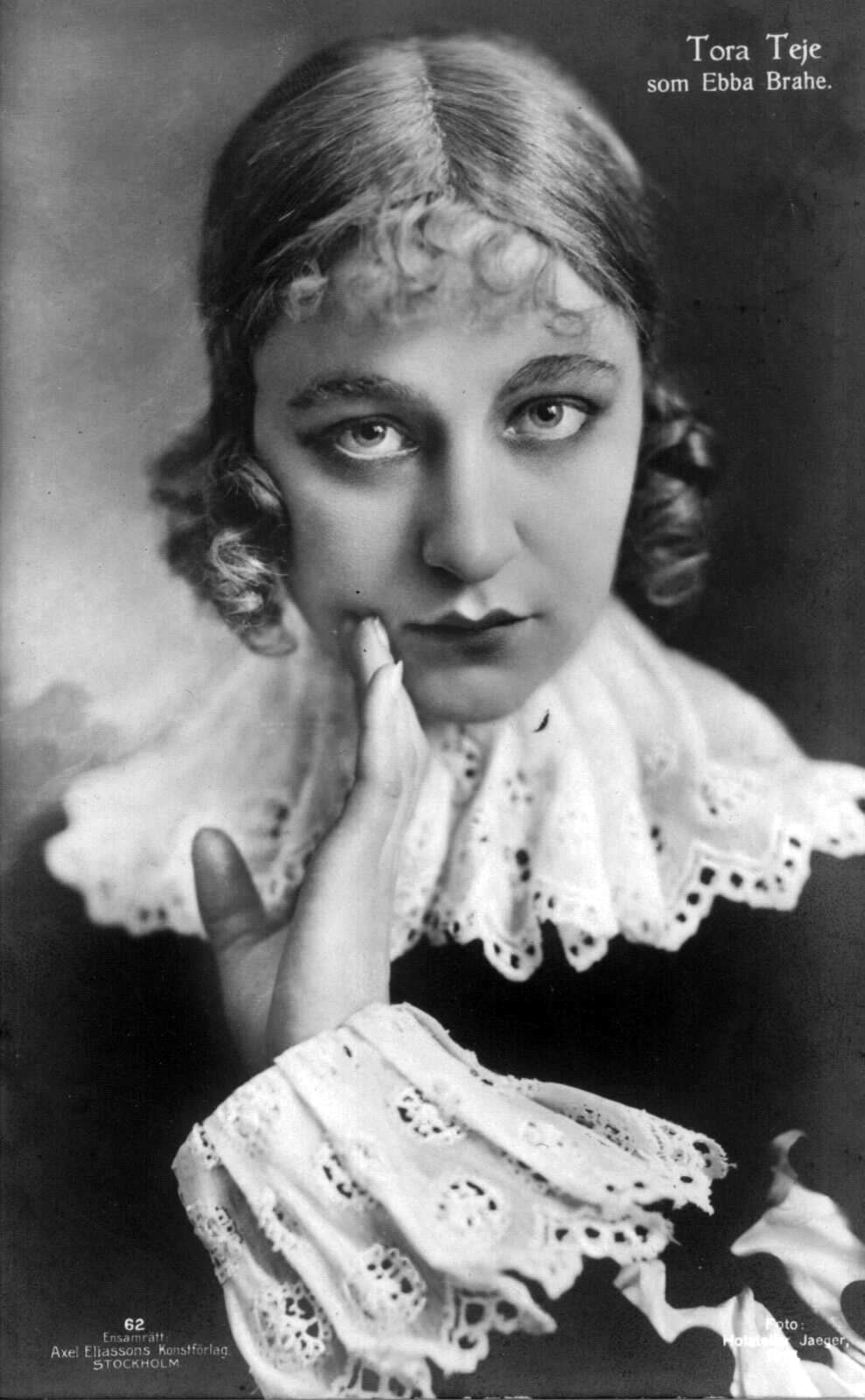
Swedish Actor Tora Teje

Tora or Thora are female given names. In North Germanic languages, both Tora and Thora are derived from the Old Norse Þóra, a name related to the Norse god Thor.

Notable people with these names include:

Thora

- Dame Thora Hird (1911–2003), English actress
- Thora Birch (born 1982), American actress
- Thora Borgarhjort or Thora Town-Hart, the daughter of Herrauðr, the earl of Götaland (present-day southern Sweden) in Norse mythology
- Thora Bjorg Helga Icelandic actress
- Thora Magnusdottir (born c. 1100), a daughter of Magnus III of Norway
- Thora Thersner (1818–1867), Swedish artist
- Thora Read (also known as Grandma Thora), a character in children's TV and book series Arthur
- Thora Wigardh (1860–1933), Swedish physician

Tora

- Tora Aasland (born 1942), Norwegian politician and former Minister of Research and Higher Education
- Tora Berger (born 1981), Norwegian biathlete and world and Olympic champion
- Tora Harris (1978), American high jumper
- Tora Vega Holmström (1880–1967), Swedish painter
- Tora Mosterstong, Norwegian concubine of King Harald Fairhair
- Tora Olafsdotter, a comic book superheroine in publications from DC Comics.
- Tora Sudiro (born 1973), Indonesian actor
- Tora Teje (1893–1970), Swedish theatre and silent film actress
- Tora Torbergsdatter (1025-?), Norwegian royal consort

== See also ==
- Tora (disambiguation)
- Tora (surname)
- Tola (name)
- Tona (name)
- Tova
