= Table of authorities =

A table of authorities is part of a legal brief that contains an index of the cases, statutes, and secondary sources cited. This article deals specifically with the characteristics of tables of authorities in the United States. The table of authorities, often called a TOA, is frequently a legal requirement for litigation briefs; the various state courts have different rules as to what kinds of briefs require a TOA. The TOA list has the name of the authority followed by the page number or numbers on which each authority appears, and the authorities are commonly listed in alphabetical order within each grouping. The intention is to allow law clerks and judges to easily and rapidly identify and access the legal authorities cited in a litigation brief. An average legal brief includes 67 citations to authority, which makes creating a table of authorities very time-consuming.

A table of authorities is also sometimes called a table of cases or a table of citations.

== Rules for citing legal authorities ==
The "Bluebook: A Uniform System of Citation" is relied upon in many jurisdictions to provide rules for citing legal authorities.

The California Style Manual has been adopted by the California Supreme Court as the official guide for styling citations in their state.

The Texas Greenbook is the guide to rules for citing legal authorities in that state.

Other states may have their own style manuals.

== Formats ==
A table of authorities can be grouped in different ways. A common grouping is to list the authorities according to the categories: cases, statutes and other authorities. Other variations (among many others) include, for example, dividing cases into federal cases and state cases, and dividing statutes into state and local.

== Sample ==
Here is a sample table of authorities:

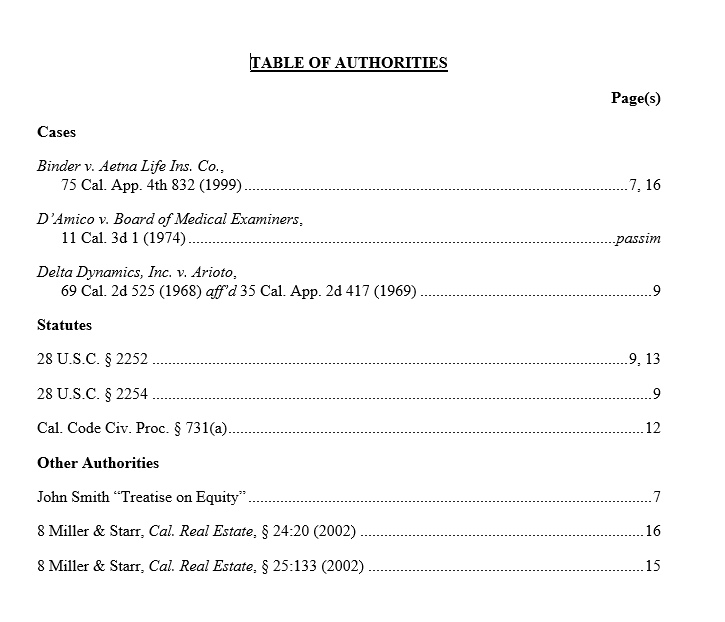
This sample table of authorities shows the common grouping according to Cases, Statutes and Other Authorities.

== Special Formats ==
=== Points and Authorities ===
In four states: Illinois, Oklahoma, Kentucky and Kansas, the state courts have different formatting requirements than the other states. These states require a table of "Points and Authorities", which is a mixing together of the table of contents and table of authorities. In this format, the authorities are listed under each issue presented for review. A table of points and authorities serves as a table of contents for the argument section of a brief, followed by a list of the cases and statutes upon which the brief relies.

Some states require the authorities that appear in each section of the document to be listed in the order in which they appear. Another variation, for example, required by the Supreme Court of Illinois, is that the "Cases shall be cited as near as may be in the order of their importance."

The First and Eleventh District Courts of Appeals in Ohio require that under each issue presented for review, the brief shall list alphabetically, in a further indented subparagraph, the cases cited in support of the issue, followed by a list of the statutes, rules, and other authorities cited in support of the issue.

Here's an example of a table of points and authorities, in which the authorities are listed in the order in which they appear in the document, under each section of the table of contents:

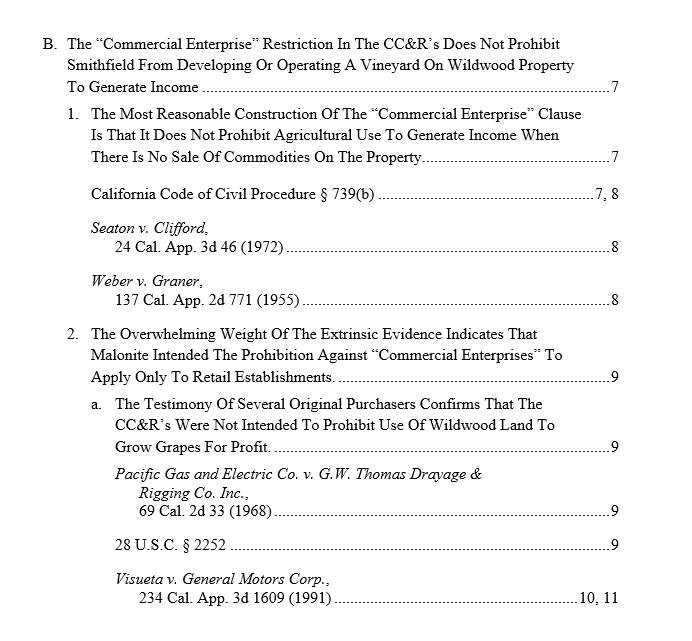
Sample table of Points and Authorities. This example shows the citations in order of their appearance under each section of the Table of Contents.

=== Asterisk in the margin ===
Some courts, including the U.S. District Court for the District of Columbia and the U.S. Court of Appeals for the Eleventh Circuit, require that an asterisk be placed in the margin to the left of the primary authorities relied upon in the brief.

== Creation with software ==
Leading word-processing software, including Microsoft Word and its competitor WordPerfect, have built-in capabilities to semi-automate the creation of a table of authorities. These programs can create tables based on user-marked citations. Even so, creating a table of authorities using Word has been said to "strike ... fear into the hearts of legal support staff" and has been called "intimidating". The process of formatting citations is called "confusing", "frustrating" and "time-consuming". The book "Legal Writing" calls the table of authorities "complicated" and says "it takes more time than you might imagine".

To simplify the process further, other applications and plug-ins for word processors provide similar functionality as well as additional features such as automatically finding and marking citations in the document. For example, Lexis for Microsoft Office integrates with the LexisNexis research platform and can check whether the citations conform to the rules of the jurisdiction and provide alerts that indicates when a cited case has been questioned or overruled by a later decision (known as "Shepardizing" the citation).

Other software products to assist with creating Tables of Authorities include:

- Best Authority, an add-in for Microsoft Word; as of 2019, it was touted as being used by 92 of the top 100 law firms
- Drafting Assistant, by Thomson Reuters, which integrates with Thomson's Westlaw research service
- Litigation Companion, by Litera
- TypeLaw, a standalone, AI-automated brief formatting platform that automatically builds TOAs and TOCs and hyperlinks citations without requiring any plug-ins.
- Legal eWrite, by Amiicuss LLC, a legal document formatting software that allows you to insert citations and automatically add them to the Table of Authorities.
- Clearbrief, an add-in for Microsoft Word that allows the user to generate an instant table of authorities with the click of a button. Save hours of time when Clearbrief compiles a perfectly formatted Table of Authorities in a single click and adds citation hyperlinks. No more tagging cases manually.
