= Trioctylamine =

Names
- Preferred IUPAC name N,N-Di(octyl)octan-1-amine

Identifiers
CAS Number	1116-76-3
3D model (JSmol)	Interactive image
ChEMBL	ChEMBL3222022
ChemSpider	13591
ECHA InfoCard	100.012.948
EC Number	214-242-1
PubChem CID	14227
UNII	I40965UY86
CompTox Dashboard (EPA)	DTXSID3047635
- InChI: InChI=1S/C24H51N/c1-4-7-10-13-16-19-22-25(23-20-17-14-11-8-5-2)24-21-18-15-12-9-6-3/h4-24H2,1-3H3 Key: XTAZYLNFDRKIHJ-UHFFFAOYSA-N
- SMILES: CCCCCCCCN(CCCCCCCC)CCCCCCCC

Properties
Chemical formula	C_{24}H_{51}N
Molar mass	353.679 g·mol^{−1}
Density	0.81 g/cm^{3}
Melting point	−34.6 °C (−30.3 °F; 238.6 K)
Solubility in water	0.050 mg/l
Viscosity	7.862 mPa.s

Hazards
- GHS labelling
Pictograms	(GHS07: Exclamation mark) (GHS08: Health hazard) (GHS09: Environmental hazard)
Signal word	Danger
Hazard statements	H315, H319, H335, H360, H372, H410, H411
Precautionary statements	P201, P202, P260, P264, P270, P271, P273, P280, P281, P302+P352, P304+P340, P305+P351+P338, P308+P313, P312, P314, P321, P332+P313, P337+P313, P362, P391, P403+P233, P405, P501
- Except where otherwise noted, data are given for materials in their standard state (at 25 °C [77 °F], 100 kPa). Infobox references

Trioctylamine is the organic compound with the formula N(C_{8}H_{17})_{3}. A colorless liquid, it is classififed as an aliphatic tertiary amine. It is highly soluble in chloroform but insoluble in water. There is a safety hazard for this chemical compound. A formulation containing metoxuron mixed with an emulsion containing trioctylamine 50%, atlox 4851 B 15%, and isopropanol 35% was active as a potato defoliant.

Trioctylamine has been used to extract monocarboxylic acid for equilibria and correlation of apparent reactive equilibrium constant. Liquid-liquid equilibria for aqueous solutions of carboxylic acids with trioctylamine in various diluents were determined at various trioctylamine concentrations. The loading of trioctylamine for a given carboxylic acid depends on the nature of the solute and its concentration. The apparent extraction equilibrium constants depend on the hydrophobicity and acidity of the carboxylic acid, as well as the specific basicity of trioctylamine. Trioctylamine production can be used as a mineral extraction reagent, an extractant for nuclear reprocessing, and its use as an extractant for identification of dyes may result in its release to the environment through various waste streams.
