= Ecalene =

Mixture of alcohols used as fuel

Ecalene is a trademarked mixture of alcohols, which may be used as fuel or as a fuel additive. The typical composition of Ecalene is as follows:

Composition of Ecalene
Component	Weight %
Ethanol	45%
Methanol	30%
Propanol	15%
Butanol	7%
Hexanol	2%
Other	1%
