= Toma (name) =

In European and Assyrian usage, the name Toma is a version of Thomas.

In the Russian language, it is a diminutive of the female given name Tamara.

In Japan, it is a male name of a different origin. The meaning will vary by which kanji are used to write this name. There is also a Japanese surname name Tōma.

== People with this surname ==
- Adrian Toma (born 1976), Romanian football player
- Alexandru Toma (1875–1954), Romanian poet, journalist and translator
- András Toma (1925–2004), Hungarian soldier, the last prisoner of WW2 to be repatriated
- Costică Toma (1928–2008), Romanian footballer
- Daniel Toma (born 2000), Romanian footballer
- Dorin Toma (born 1977), Romanian footballer
- Emile Toma (1919–1985), Palestinian political historian
- George Toma (born 1929), American groundskeeper
- HoSo Terra Toma, Korean American drag queen
- Loredana Toma (born 1995), Romanian weightlifter
- Miguel Ángel Toma (born 1949), Argentine politician
- Peter Toma, Hungarian-born computer scientist
- Sanda Toma (rower) (born 1956), Romanian female rower
- Sanda Toma (canoeist) (born 1970), Romanian female canoeist
- Svetlana Toma (born 1947), Moldovan-Russian actress
- Valer Toma (born 1957), Romanian rower
- Veresa Toma (born 1981), Fijian footballer
- Yumi Tōma (born 1966), Japanese voice actress

== People with this given name ==
- Russian-language diminutive for feminine name Tamara
- Toma bar Yacoub, 9th century Church of the East bishop
- Toma Bebić (1935–1990), Croatian musician and artist
- Toma Caragiu (1925–1977), Romanian actor
- Toma Ciorbă (1864–1936), Romanian physician
- Toma Enache (born 1970), Romanian film director
- Toma Ghițulescu (1902–1983), Romanian engineer, politician, and Olympic bobsledder
- Toma Hanlon (died 1929), American actress, singer, male impersonator
- Toma Ikuta (born 1984), Japanese actor and singer
- Toma Macovei (1911–2003), Romanian soldier and linguist
- Toma Ovici, Romanian tennis player
- Toma Prošev (1931–1996), Macedonian composer
- Toma Rosandić (1878–1959), Croatian sculptor
- Toma Sik (Toma Ŝik) (1939–2004), Hungarian-Israeli peace activist
- Toma Simionov (born 1955), Romanian canoer
- Toma Toke (born 1985), Tongan rugby union player
- Toma Tomov (born 1958), Bulgarian athlete
- Toma Zdravkov (born 1987), Bulgarian singer, winner of Music Idol song contest
- Toma Zdravković (1938–1991), Serbian folk singer

== Fictional characters ==
- Toma Kamijo, main protagonist of A Certain Magical Index

== See also ==
- Toma (disambiguation)
