= Tovar (surname) =

The coat of arms of the Tovar family of Spain and Portugal, as it appears in a 17th-century nobiliary record.

Tovar, usually preceded by the particle de (meaning from), is a surname that was adopted in the Middle-Ages by a Castilian noble house that received the lordship of the village of Tovar from Fernando III. It has since spread to several Spanish and a few Portuguese branches.

The Tovar surname in the Americas appears mainly as a toponymic derived from the many settlements of this name founded there by the Spanish, and therefore does not share the same genealogical origin.

== People ==
- Alonso Miguel de Tovar, a Spanish baroque painter
- Antonio Tovar, a Spanish philologist
- César Tovar, a Venezuelan Major League Baseball player
- Christian Tovar, a Mexican footballer
- Ezequiel Tovar, Venezuelan baseball player
- Fernando Sánchez de Tovar, a medieval Spanish nobleman and admiral
- Francisco de Paula Vieira da Silva de Tovar, 1st Viscount of Molelos, a Portuguese nobleman and general
- Jorge Tovar, a Mexican sculptor
- José de Guevara y Tovar, Spanish viceroy of Navarre
- Gustavo Tovar Arroyo, a Venezuelan poet
- Juan Sancho de Tovar, 1st Marquis of Berlanga
- Juan de Tovar y Toledo, a Spanish nobleman and military of the Reconquista
- Luis Felipe Tovar, a Mexican actor
- Lupita Tovar, Mexican-American actress
- Manuel Felipe Tovar, President of Venezuela from 1859 to 1861
- Martín Tovar Ponte, a Venezuelan politician
- Martín Tovar y Tovar, a Venezuelan painter
- Miguel Ángel Tovar, a Venezuelan actor and fashion model
- Rigo Tovar, a Mexican singer
- Rodrigo Tovar Pupo, a Colombian paramilitar
- Vicente López Tovar, a Republican soldier in the Spanish Civil War
- Virginia Tovar Martín, Spanish art historian, author, and professor; foremost scholar in the study of architecture and urban planning of Madrid during the Baroque period.
- Virgie Tovar
- Sancho de Tovar, a Castilian-born, Portuguese navigator and explorer
- Sancho de Tovar e Silva, grandson of the former, a Portuguese nobleman and military

== See also ==
- Tovar (disambiguation)
- Tova
