= Chief of the King's Guard (Portugal and Castile) =

Portuguese officer whose function was to protect the monarch and command his Guard

The Chief of the King's Guard, King's Chief Guard, or Chief of the King's Corps, (guarda-mor do rei, or guarda-mor do Corpo do Rei in Portuguese) was an officer of the Crown of Castile and of the Portuguese Royal Family whose function was to protect the monarch and command his guard.

== History ==
Some authors, when speaking of this position, state that it was more "honorific than effective", although Jaime de Salazar y Acha points out that this may have been the case during the last period of the Late Middle Ages, but not in its beginnings, since in the first instance the king's security was in the hands of his ensign, but the latter in turn would delegate this responsibility to the officer of lower rank who would possibly, over the centuries, evolve into, in the opinion of this historian, the officer known as the Chief of the King's Guard.

When the office of the king's ensign was monopolized by members of the high nobility in the 13th century, such as the Lara and the Haro, as well as by young members of the royalty, and even young boys, the protection of the king was left in the hands of his chief guard. The position is mentioned for the first time in the reign of Sancho IV of Castile. In the Crónica (chronicle) of this monarch, the Portuguese nobleman Esteban Pérez Florián is mentioned as "guard of the King", and in the document from 1290 Diego Gómez de Roa is mentioned as "guard-major of our Body" ("guarda-mor de nosso Corpo").

Around 1424, the position of chief guard was shared by two individuals, although it is not known whether this was because it had then become more of an "honorific than an effective" title, or because they alternated in holding it. However, it is certain that in 1447, during the reign of John II of Castile, and according to what is stated in one of the records of his reign, several individuals held the position, which had already become hereditary for several families of the kingdom, receiving 20,000 maravedis a year.

== Duties ==
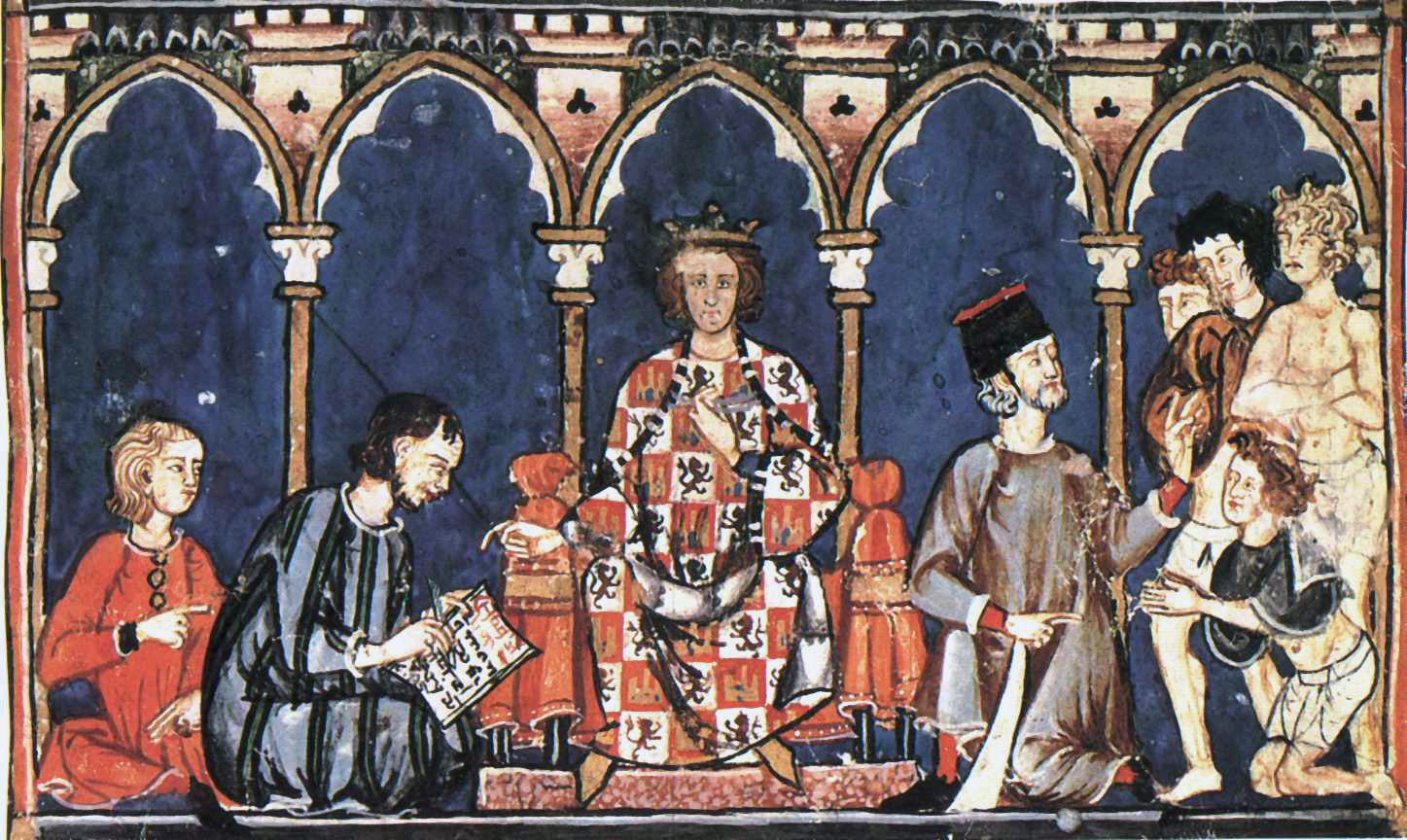
Medieval picture depicting King Afonso X and his court. Libro de los juegos

In the reign of Alfonso X of Castile, as Manuel González Jiménez has pointed out, the chief of the king's guard was responsible for the safety of the king and his family at court or in his palace, and a small group of men were at his command, including twenty infantry crossbowmen and ten on horseback, who protected the court or the place where the monarch was, although the twenty knights and a similar number of squires on foot were in charge of protecting the monarch and his family.

Other duties of the chief guard were:

- Commanding the personal guard that protected the king.
- Coordinate everything related to the monarch's security and take charge of its organization.
- Cooperate with other court officials such as the justiças-mores of the Royal House or the king's alguacis-mores, who were in charge of certain police and public order tasks within the court.

== List of chiefs of the king's guard ==
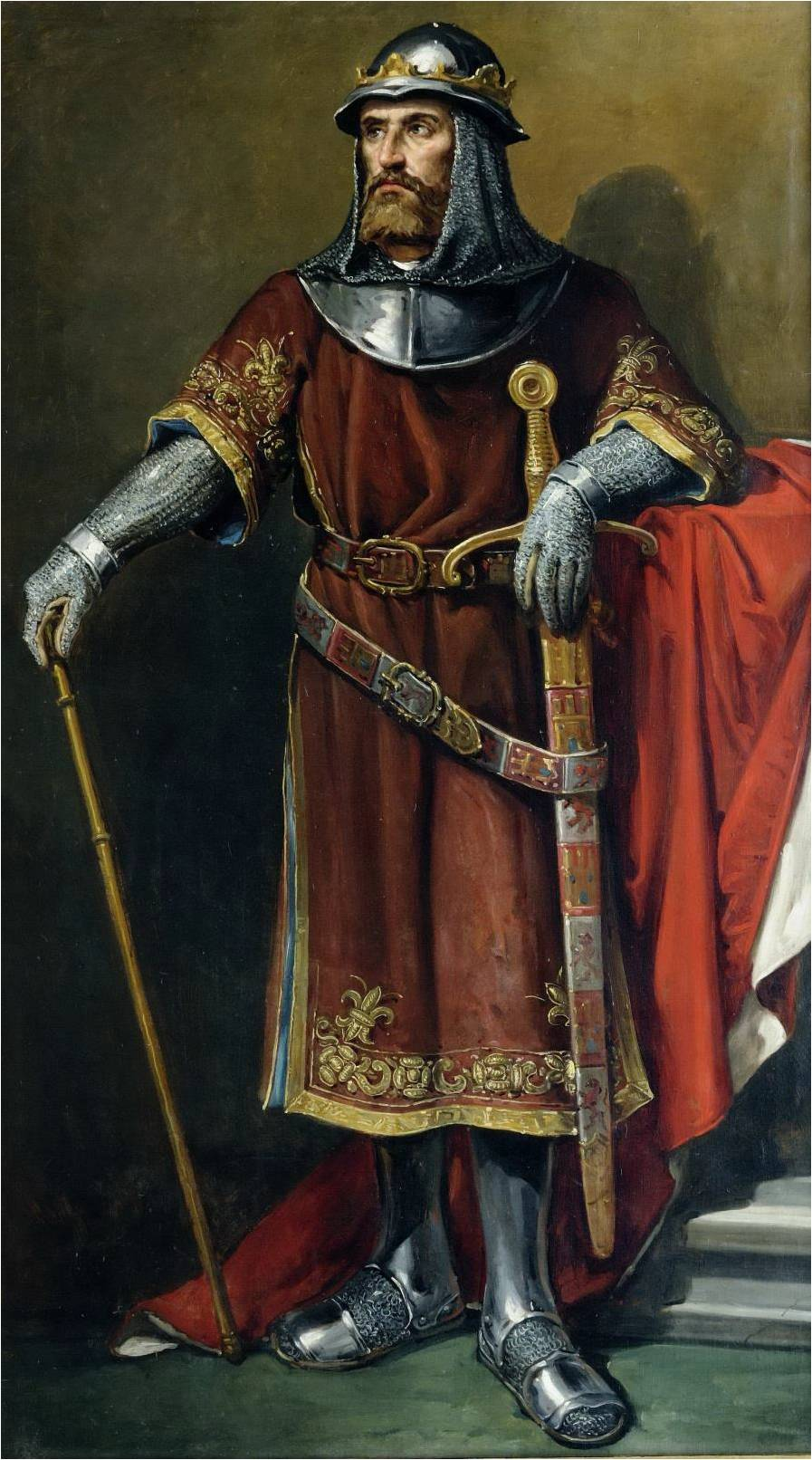
Speculative portrait of King Sancho IV of Castile. By José María Rodríguez de Losada (León City Council).

=== Sancho IV (1284-1295) ===
- (1286) Esteban Pérez Florián. He was also meirinho-mor (person applying justice and overseeing the application of justice on myearrial lands) of León and Asturias, alcalde of Serpa, and Mora and lieutenant of the fortresses of San Esteban de Gormaz, Castrojeriz, Fermoselle and Trastámara.
- (1290) Diego Gómez de Roa.
- (1291) Fernán Pérez de Andrade.
- (1293–1294) Sancho Sánchez de Ulloa. He was a Castilian nobleman of the Ulloa family, also lord of Ulloa and of Monterroso and reposteiro-mor of King Sancho IV of Castile. He was a member of the Order of St. John of Jerusalem.

=== Alfonso XI (1312-1350) ===
- (1327) Juan Martínez de Leiva. He was lord of Leiva, Banhos, A Coruña, and Valdescaray, meirinho-mor of Castile, guard and steward to King Alfonso XI of Castile, meirinho-mor of Biscay, knight of the Order of the Band (cavaleiro da Ordem da Banda), meirinho-mor of Biscay, notary (notário-mor das mordomias rodadas) and chamberlain to the Infanta Leonor of Castile, sister of Alfonso XI and later queen consort of Aragon by her marriage to King Alfonso IV of Aragon.
- (1327–1340) Alonso Jofré Tenorio. He was lord of Moguer, admiral of Castile, chief guard of the king, alcalde of Seville and alguacil-mor of Toledo. He was the son of Diego Alfonso Tenorio, chief treasurer of the king, and Aldonza Jofre de Loaysa. He died fighting against the Muslims in a naval battle in the Strait of Gibraltar in 1340.
- (1350) Lope Díaz de Cifuentes. Castilian rico homem (nobleman who fought for the king) and lord of Almansa. He was the son of Diego Ramírez de Cifuentes, adiantado-mor of León and Asturias and lord of Almanza and Cifuentes, and Leonor Fernández de Saldaña.

=== Peter I (1350-1369) ===
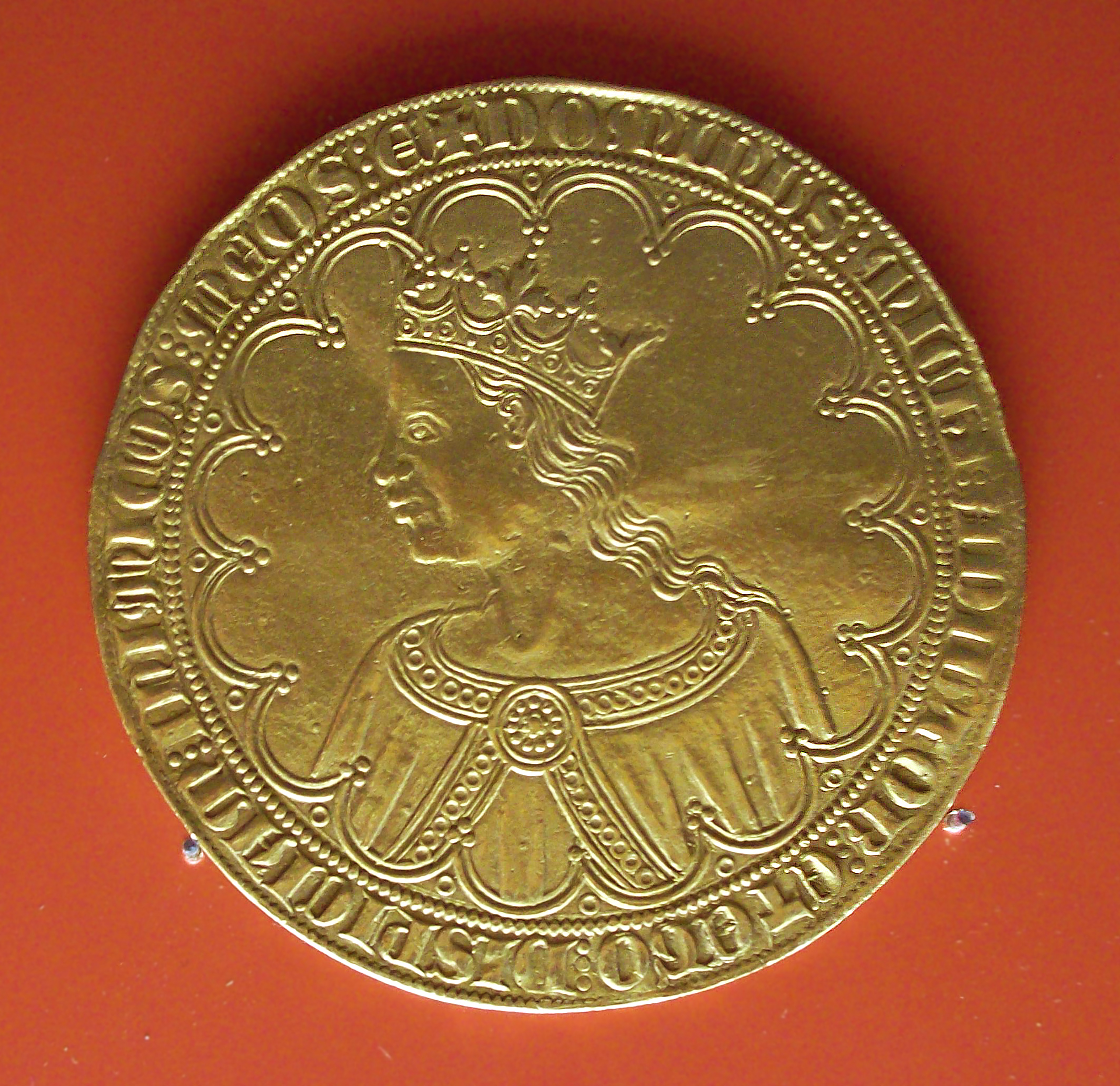
Gran dobla or dobla de a diez of Peter I of Castile, son and successor of Alfonso XI, minted Gran dobla de Pedro I de Castilla 1360 (M.A.N. 1867-21-2) 01.jpg in Seville in 1360. (M.A.N., Madrid)

- (1350) Gutier Fernández de Toledo. He was lord of Anamella, steward of Peter I of Castile and also his chief guard.
- (1351) Fernán Pérez Calvillo. He was lord of Cotillas, alcalde das sacas of the kingdom of Murcia in the territories from Vejas to Ontur, alcalde of the king and his chief guard, and tenente (lieutenant) do adiantado-mor deste reino in the name of Martín López de Córdoba, master of the orders of Alcántara and Calatrava. He was the son of Hernán Calvillo, lord of Cotillas, and Teresa García.
- (1352) According to Díaz Martín, in February 1352, Gómez Pérez de Toledo, who was alguacil-mor of Toledo, was chief guard, although Jaime de Salazar y Acha points out that this author may have confused the father with the son and that in reality the king's guard at that time was Díaz Gómez de Toledo, son of Gómez Pérez and lord of Casarrubios, Valdepusa and Malpica, notário-mor (notary major) of the kingdom of Toledo and alcalde-mor of said city.
- (1353) Pedro González de Mendoza. He was a Castilian nobleman of the House of Mendoza, son of Gonzalo Yáñez de Mendoza and Juana de Orozco. He was lord of Hita and Buitrago, among many other towns, chamberlain to King John I of Castile, and held the position of adiantado-mor of Castile between late 1365 and early 1366.
- (1354) Juan Rodríguez de Cisneros. He was a Castilian rico homem, lord of the House of Viduerna, Castrillo and Guardo, chief guard of the king, and adiantado and meirinho-mor of León and Asturias. Cisneros was the son of Arias González de Cisneros, rico homem of Castile, and Mencía de Manzanedo.
- (1355–1356) Fernán Pérez Portocarrero. By early October 1355 he was already the king's chief guard and held the post until at least mid-October 1356. He was lord of Pinto, adiantado-mor of Castile, officer of the king's squadron, and was the son of Martín Fernández Portocarrero and Inés Pardo.
- (1361–1368) Men Rodríguez de Biedma. He adopted the name Men Rodríguez de Benavides after being appointed heir to the estate of the House of Benavides by his cousin, Juan Alfonso de Benavides, who was the son of Juan Alfonso de Benavides and Teresa Alonso Godínez. Biedma was chief steward to Queen Blanche of Bourbon and justiça-mor of the king's household, among many other posts, and was also lord of Santisteban del Puerto, La Mota, Tenorio, Mayela, Estivella and Ardiles, caudilho-mor of the Bishopric of Jaén and captain-general of the border in 1360.
- (1368) Gonzalo González Dávila. In 1368 he was the king's chief guard, according to a grant (privilégio rodado) issued on May 26 of the same year. Luis Vicente Díaz Martín points out that this was the only occasion on which a king's chief guard was among the confirmants of a document of this kind.
- (1368–1369) Men Rodríguez de Biedma.

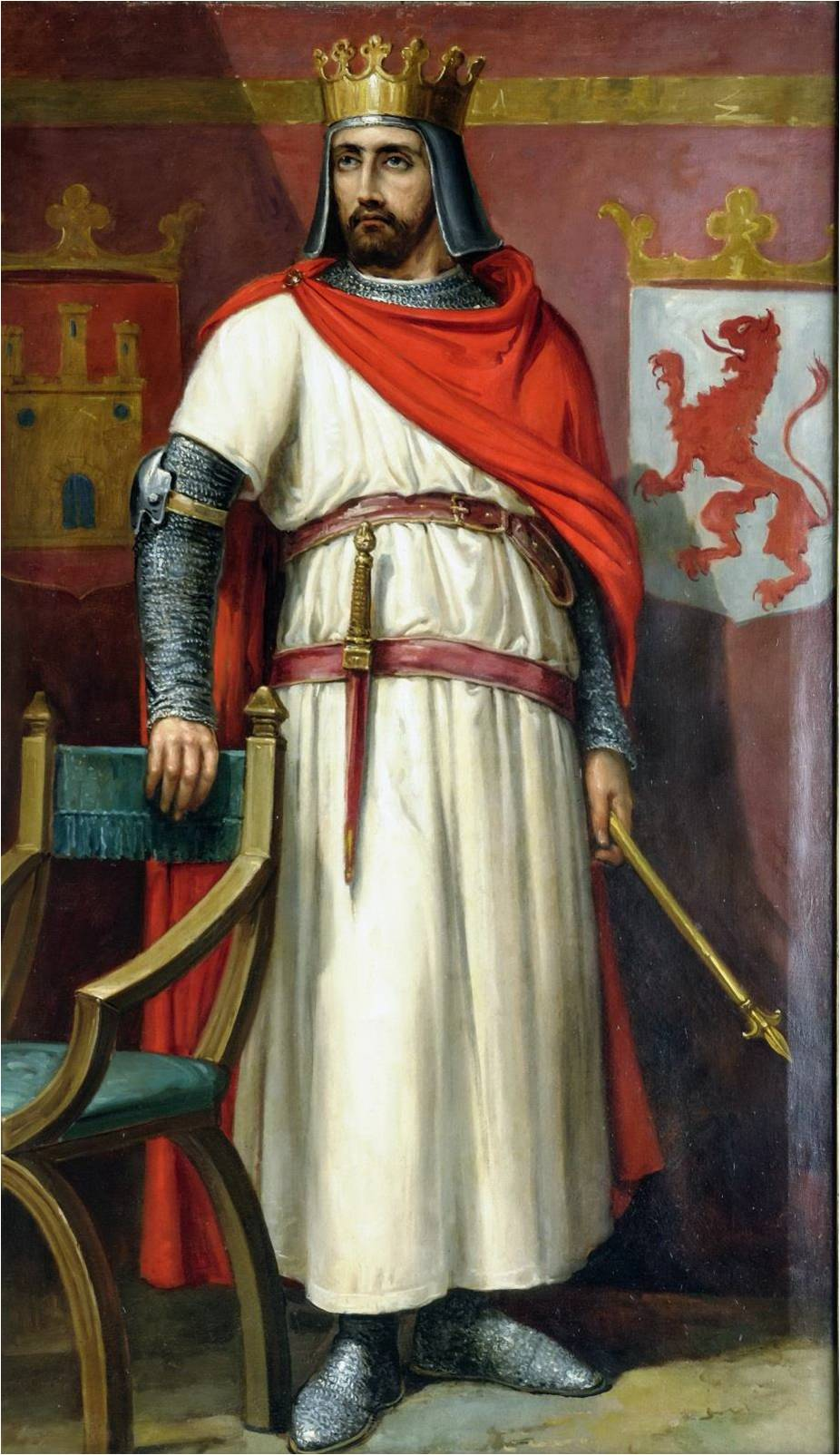
Fictional portrait of Henry II of Castile. By José María Rodríguez de Losada (Municipality of León)

=== Henry II (1369-1379) ===
- (1369–1379) Men Rodríguez de Biedma.
- (1370–1374) Fernando Sánchez de Tovar. He was lord of Astudillo, Castroponce, Los Gelves and the Aljarafe. He held the offices of adiantado-mor of Castile, admiral of Castile, chief guard of the king and alcaide entregador da Mesta. He died of plague in 1384 during the siege of Lisbon, and was the son of Ruy Fernández de Tovar and Elvira Ruiz Cabeza de Vaca.
- (1375–1379) Sancho Fernández de Tovar. He was the son of the previous one and of Isabel de Padilla, having married Teresa de Toledo. He was lord of Cevico de la Torre and chief guard of kings Henry II, John II and Henry III of Castile.

=== John I (1379-1390) ===
- (1379–1381) Men Rodríguez de Biedma. According to Jaime de Salazar y Acha, he held the post of chief guard of the king throughout several reigns and until 1381. However, Francisco de Paula Canas Gálvez states that he did so only until 1380.
- (1379–1390) Sancho Fernández de Tovar.
- (1380) Íñigo Ortiz de Zúñiga. He was lord of Alesanco, chief steward to Queen Blanche of Bourbon and alcalde-mor of Seville, and was the son of Diego López de Zúñiga, lord of Alesanco, and Teresa Hurtado de Mendoza. Salazar and Acha, based on the Crónica do rei Dom Pedro ("Chronicle of King Peter"), states that he was chief guard to Queen Blanche in 1361.
- (1386) Pedro Rodríguez de Fonseca. He held the lordships of Mora, Casiyear and Condacunto in Portugal, among others, and was also alcalde of Castelo de Olivença, chief innkeeper (estalajadeiro-mor) to King John I of Castile and his son Henry III, chief guard to King John I of Castile, and selador-mor to the same monarch. He was also the son of the Portuguese knight Rui Pires da Fonseca and Inés de Acuña.

=== Henry III (1390-1406) ===
- (1390–1394) Sancho Fernández de Tovar.

=== Chiefs of the King's guard from the 15th century ===
From this century several families held the position hereditarily and simultaneously:

- The Tovars, lords of Cevico de la Torre.
- The Mendozas, lords of Almazán.
- The Fonseca, lords of Badajoz.
- The Zúñiga, lords of Alesanco.
- Osorio, counts of Trastámara.
- The Acuña, counts of Buendía.
- The Manuel, lords of Belmonte de Campos and descendants of King Ferdinand III of Castile.

== Chiefs of the queen's guard ==
- (1361) Íñigo Ortiz de Zúñiga, mentioned above. In 1361 he was chief guard to Queen Blanche of Bourbon, wife of Pedro I of Castile.

== Bibliography ==
- Cañas Gálvez, Francisco de Paula (2011), "La Casa de Juan I de Castilla: aspectos domésticos y ámbitos privados de la realeza castellana a finales del siglo XIV (ca. 1370-1390)", En la España medieval (in Spanish) (34), Madrid: Universidad Complutense: Servicio de Publicaciones y Departamento de Historia Medieval: 133–180, ISSN 0214-3038
- Díaz Martín, Luis Vicente (1987), Los oficiales de Pedro I de Castilla (in Spanish) (2nd ed.), Valladolid: Secretariado de Publicaciones de la Universidad de Valladolid
- González Jiménez, Manuel (2006–2007), "La corte de Alfonso X el Sabio" (PDF), Alcanate: Revista de estudios Alfonsíes (in Spanish) (5), El Puerto de Santa María: Cátedra Alfonso X el Sabio: 13–130, ISSN 1579-0576
- Jular Pérez-Alfaro, Cristina (1990), Servicio de Publicaciones de la Universidad de León y Consejería de Cultura y Turismo de la Junta de Castilla y León (ed.), Los adelantados y merinos mayores de León (siglos XIII-XV), Biblioteca de Castilla y León: nº 12 de la Serie Historia (in Spanish) (1st ed.), León: Gráficas Celarayn S.A., ISBN 84-7719-225-1
- Orella Unzué, José Luis (1984), "Los orígenes de la Hermandad de Guipúzcoa (las relaciones Guipúzcoa-Navarra en los siglos XIII-XIV)" (PDF), Cuadernos de Sección. Historia-Geografía (in Spanish), San Sebastián: Sociedad de Estudios Vascos: 25–100, ISSN 0212-6397, archived from the original (PDF) on 27 December 2013
- Pardo de Guevara y Valdés, Eduardo (2005), "De las viejas estirpes a las nuevas hidalguías. El entramado nobiliario gallego al fin de la Edad Media" (PDF), Nalgures (in Spanish) (3), La Coruña: Asociación cultural de Estudios históricos de Galicia: 263–278, ISSN 1885-6349
- Pardo de Guevara y Valdés, Eduardo (2012), Fundación cultural de la Nobleza Española y Consejo Superior de Investigaciones Científicas (ed.), De linajes, parentelas y grupos de poder: aportaciones a la historia social de la nobleza bajomedieval gallega (PDF) (in Spanish) (1st ed.), Madrid: Gráficas Alberdi, ISBN 978-84-939737-2-8
- Salazar y Acha, Jaime de (2000), Centro de Estudios Políticos y Constitucionales (ed.), La casa del Rey de Castilla y León en la Edad Media, Colección Historia de la Sociedad Política, dirigida por Bartolomé Clavero Salvador (in Spanish) (1st ed.), Madrid: Rumagraf S.A., ISBN 978-84-259-1128-6
