= Juan de Tovar =

15th century Castilian nobleman

Juan Fernández de Tovar
- King's Guard
- Other titles: Chief-guard to Henry IV of Castile, lord of Cevico de La Torre and Caracena
- Other names: Martin Fernández de Tovar Martim Fernandes de Tovar
- Known for: Ally of Afonso V of Portugal in favor of Joanna, the Beltraneja; Lord of Cevico and Caracena; Head of the Tovares of Portugal; Father of the navigator Sancho de Tovar.
- Born: 15th century Kingdom of Castile
- Died: 1500
- Noble family: House of Tovar
- Spouse: Leonor de Vilhena
- Issue: Francisco de Tovar Sancho de Tovar Margarida Manuel
- Parents: Father: Sancho de Tovar

Juan de Tovar or Juan Fernández de Tovar, later known as Martín Fernández de Tovar (- 1500), was a Castilian nobleman, belonging to the House of Tovar, Lord of the villages of Cevico de la Torre and Caracena, and Chief-guard to King Henry IV of Castile.

After the monarch's death, he did not recognize the king's half-sister, Princess Isabella, as sovereign, thus joining the party of the Marquis of Vilhena, Juan Pacheco, and the Archbishop of Toledo, Alfonso Carrillo, in support of the king's alleged daughter, Joanna la Beltraneja, and her husband Afonso V, King of Portugal. For this reason, Tovar had the lordships of Cevico and Caracena confiscated in 1489 by the Catholic Monarchs, who sentenced him to death, and fled to France the following year.

In Portugal, he was known by the name Martim Fernandes de Tovar, for having aligned himself with King Afonso V against the Catholic Monarchs and in favour of Joanna la Beltraneja. He was also known as the father of the navigator Sancho de Tovar and as the head of the Tovar family in the country.

== Family ==
Tovar was born under the name Juan, son of Sancho Fernández de Tovar, Lord of Cevico, and Chief-guard to John II of Castile, a cadet branch of the House of Tovar. His father, Sancho de Tovar, is documented as early as 1432 in possession of the Lordship of Cevico. (Note: A diploma given in Ciudad Rodrigo on 2 October 1432, confirms him as Sancho de Tovar, Señor de Cevico, Guarda Mayor del Rey Salazar y Castro (1694, p. 81) Likewise it confirms the creation of the morgadio of D. Álvaro de Luna, on 26 February 1438: Sancho de Tovar, Señor de Cevico, Guarda Mayor del Rey confirma de Flores, D. José MiguelCrónica de D. Álvaro de Luna (1784). Crónica de D. Álvaro de Luna (in Spanish). p. 411.). In 1449, Sancho de Tovar, "son of Juan de Tovar", renounced to the Count of Urueña, Juan Téllez-Girón, all the rights he had in the majorat of the House of Tovar. Juan de Tovar, his paternal grandfather, was also Lord of the towns of Cevico and Caracena, and Chief-guard to John II of Castile. He married Catarina Manuel, daughter of Pedro Manuel (Rico-Homem and Lord of the towns of Montealegre and Meneses) and Juana Manrique. According to Salazar y Castro, Juan de Tovar was also the paternal great-grandson of Sancho de Tovar, Lord of Cevico and Keeper of the Kingdom, and Teresa de Toledo.

In 1460, Juan de Tovar married Leonor de Vilhena, receiving from his future wife a dowry of 700 thousand maravedis, promising her, in return, 200 thousand maravedis. Leonor was Portuguese and from a noble family: Sister of Rodrigo Afonso de Melo, Count of Olivença, both part of the numerous offspring of Martim Afonso de Melo, Chief-guard to the King Edward, alcalde and frontier of Olivença, and Lord of Ferreira de Aves (deceased before 1469), and Margarida de Vilhena. On her father's side, she was the granddaughter of another Martim Afonso de Melo (Chief-guard to John I and alcalde of Évora) and Beatriz Pimentel, daughter of João Afonso, Lord of Bragança. On the maternal side, she was the granddaughter of Rui Vaz Coutinho.

== Lord of Cevico de la Torre and Caracena ==
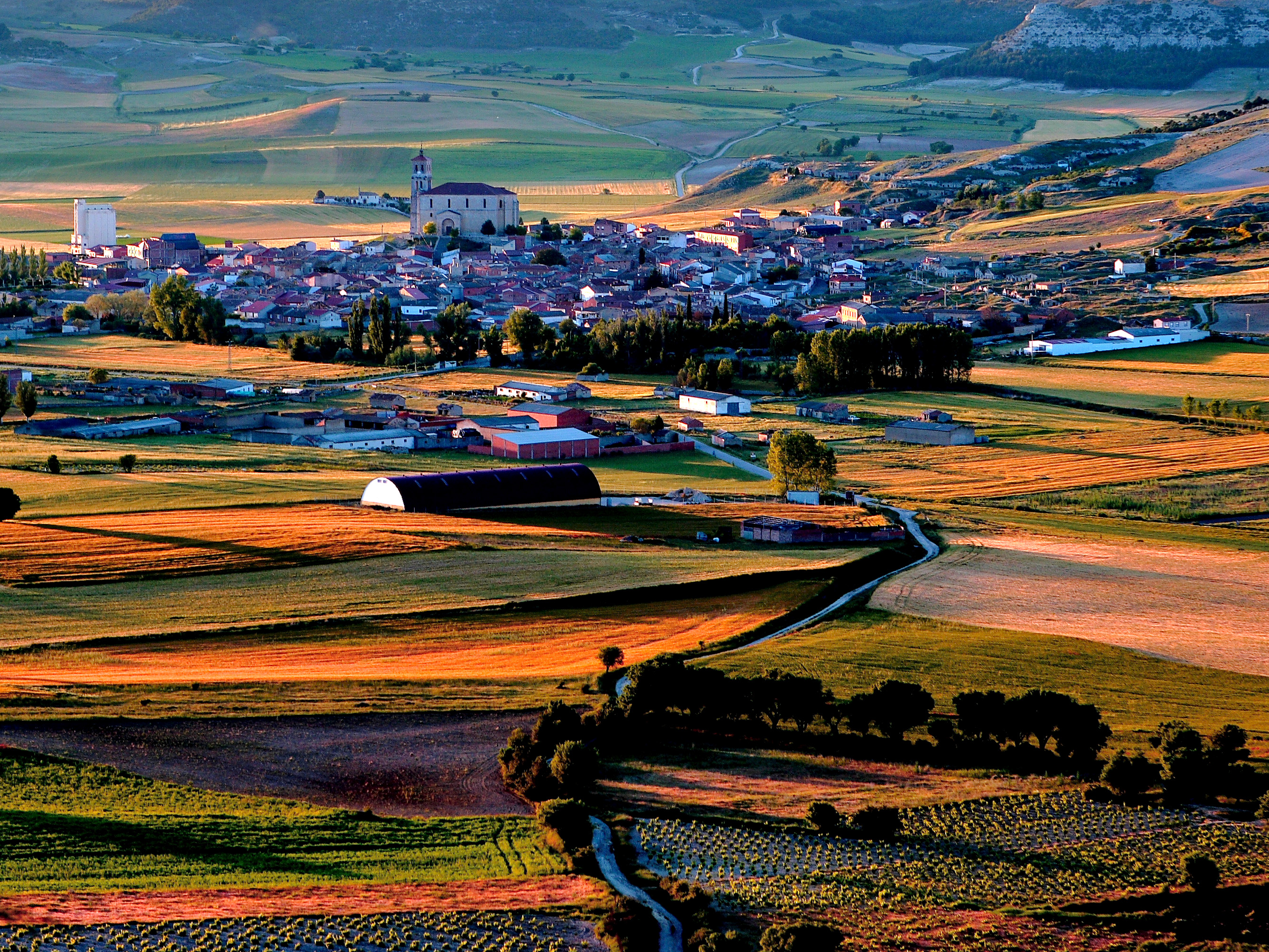
View of Cevico de la Torre, in the Province of Palencia, Castile and León.

In 1465, Tovar was already Lord of the villages of Cevico de la Torre and Caracena, as is attested on April 2 of that year, when Henry IV of Castile grants Juan Fernández de Tovar, Lord of Cevico de la Torre and Caracena, son and successor of Sancho de Tovar (already deceased), 40,000 maravedis per year of tenace to maintain 20 spears (Note: To be read: 20 lancers) in his service. The lordships of Cevico de la Torre and Caracena had been in the Tovar lineage since 8 June 1368, when Henry II of Castile, by charter passed in Real regarding Toledo, granted them to his Chief-guard Sancho Fernández de Tovar, Juan's great-grandfather and brother of the Lord Admiral of Castile Fernando Sánchez de Tovar. The Lordship of Cevico might have initially been part of the Lordship of Berlanga, owned by the main branch of the Tovar. This main branch was dismembered in order to favor a secondary branch of the lineage.

Although he only documented himself in possession of the lordship in 1465, Juan was already involved in the administration of the lordship before that date. In 1460, he delivered in perpetual census the mill of Rebollosa de Pedro to the municipalities of Manzanares, Sabero and Termantia, places belonging to the jurisdiction of Caracena. The condition for this was that the inhabitants pay Tovar 75 bushels of bread, namely: 50 of wheat and 25 of rye, per day of San Miguel further authorizing the inhabitants of these three villages the cutting of wood from all the hills of Caracena whenever its destination was for the use of the mill. The inhabitants of the three counties were obliged to give the peons that were necessary for the mill's work, preventing them from using the mill's water to water their vegetable gardens, meadows and bread lands, except on Saturdays and Sundays.

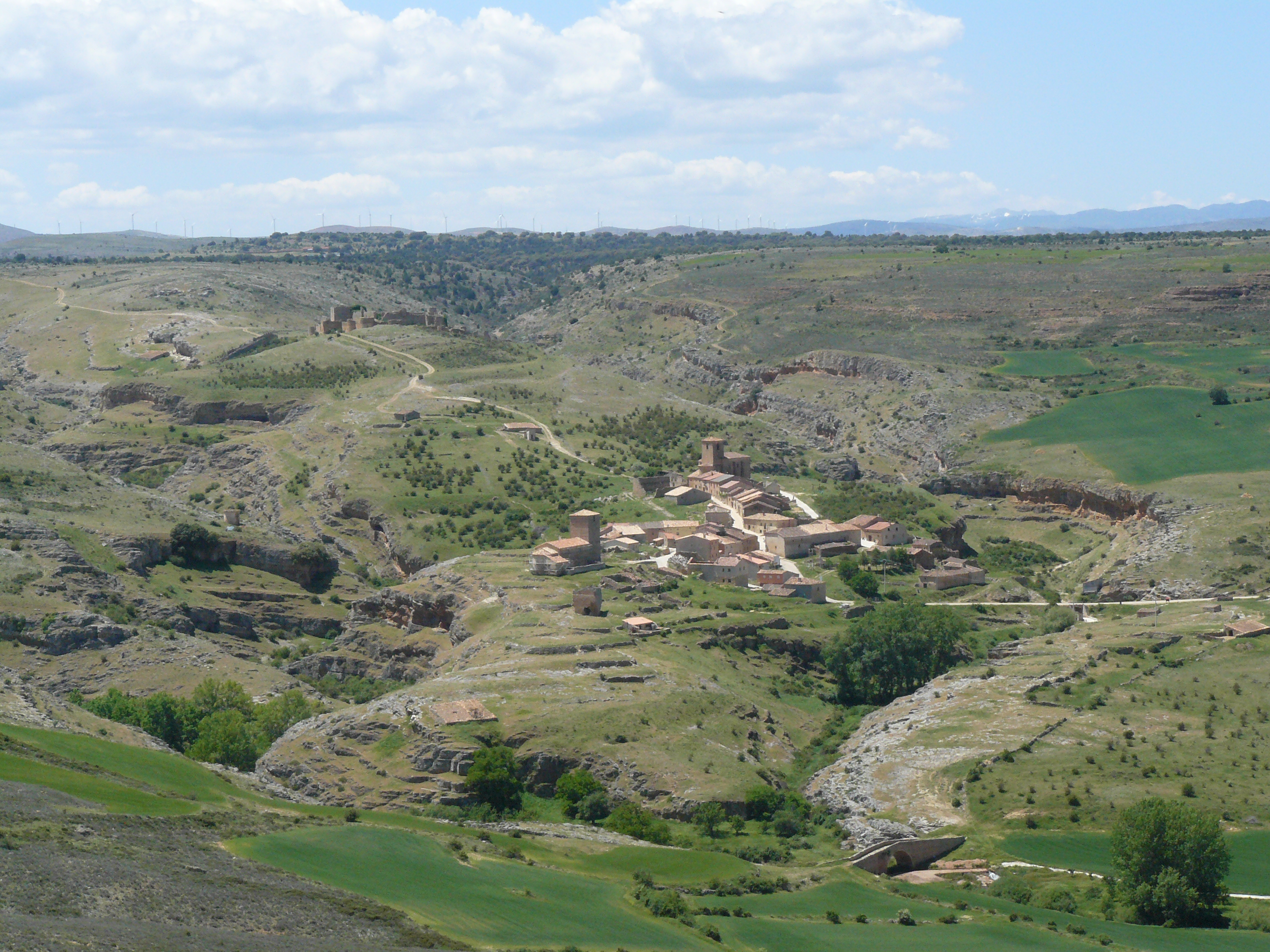
The small town of Caracena, in the Province of Soria. In the background, at a short distance from the village, the castle of Caracena (belonging to the landlord).

The relations of the lord of Caracena with the manorial villages near his lands were not always cordial. In the 1460s, taking advantage of the bad relations between Juana Pimentel (widow of Álvaro de Luna) and Henry IV, Juan de Tovar invaded several times the lands of San Esteban de Gormaz, robbing and plundering the humble peasants of the county. This continued until Juana de Luna, heiress to Don Alvaro's lineage, married Diégo Lopez Pacheco, firstborn of the Marquis of Vilhena Juan Pacheco. The latter, acting on behalf of his daughter-in-law, responded to the violence initiated by Tovar with more violence, invading his lands and seizing the village of Inés, thus forcing him to sign the peace. On 20 April 1468 Juan de Tovar was forced to accept the conditions imposed by Juan Pacheco: the village of Inés, and Francisco de Tovar, firstborn of the lord of Caracena, would remain in the possession of his cousin Juan de Tovar, Lord of Berlanga, for one year. This served as guarantee that the peace signed between them would not be violated, after which time they would return to the possession and company of Tovar.

== Loss of the Lordship of Caracena ==
A few years later, Juan de Tovar, then Chief-guard of Henry IV, would eventually lose his Lordship of Caracena. After the death of the sovereign, Juan de Tovar not only did not recognize Princess Isabella as queen of Castile, but he joined the group of the Marquis of Vilhena and the Archbishop of Toledo, Alfonso Carrillo, who supported Joanna la Beltraneja as queen. After the defeat of the marquis of Vilhena at the Battle of Toro, the Catholic Monarchs made peace with Tovar and other knights who had followed the fate of Diego López Pacheco, deciding to be lenient with the uprisings. Juan de Tovar was pardoned by diploma given at Toro on 10 December 1476. Hostilities, however, did not cease. Instead, many of the knights pardoned, and momentarily reintegrated into royal obedience, turned against the monarchs again. Thus, in 1478, when Archbishop Alfonso Carrillo's second attempt to resurrect the Beltraneja party occurred, Juan de Tovar, who was then already called Martín Fernández de Tovar, was one of the conjurors. He provided cover for a new invasion of Castile by Afonso V of Portugal, and occupied the town of Alcalá de Henares in the name of la Beltraneja.' (Note: As explained in full detail in the decree of confiscation of goods of 20 June 1489: "Juan de Tovar, who is now called Martín Fernández de Tovar, (...) gathered all the people he could in the town of Alcalá, strengthening it and making there great war equipment. He joined with the archbishop and requested favor and support for him so that the king of Portugal would again enter these, our kingdoms, persevering in the crime of lèse-majesté."Franco Silva (1987, p. 520))

The final defeat of the Portuguese army and its partisans brought harsh punishments for the latter: Diego López Pacheco lost a large part of the towns and lands of the Marquesado de Vilhena, Juan de Tovar was sentenced to death, and the total loss of his landholdings, confiscated by the Spanish Crown. Tovar's protests were to no avail, deciding to sell Cevico de la Torre and Caracena. On 26 January 1486 the Catholic Monarchs issued a decree to the municipalities of Medina del Campo, Tordesillas and Dueñas forbidding the purchase of places and lands from these, under penalty of losing the properties. Their definitive confiscation took place by a decree dated 20 June 1489.

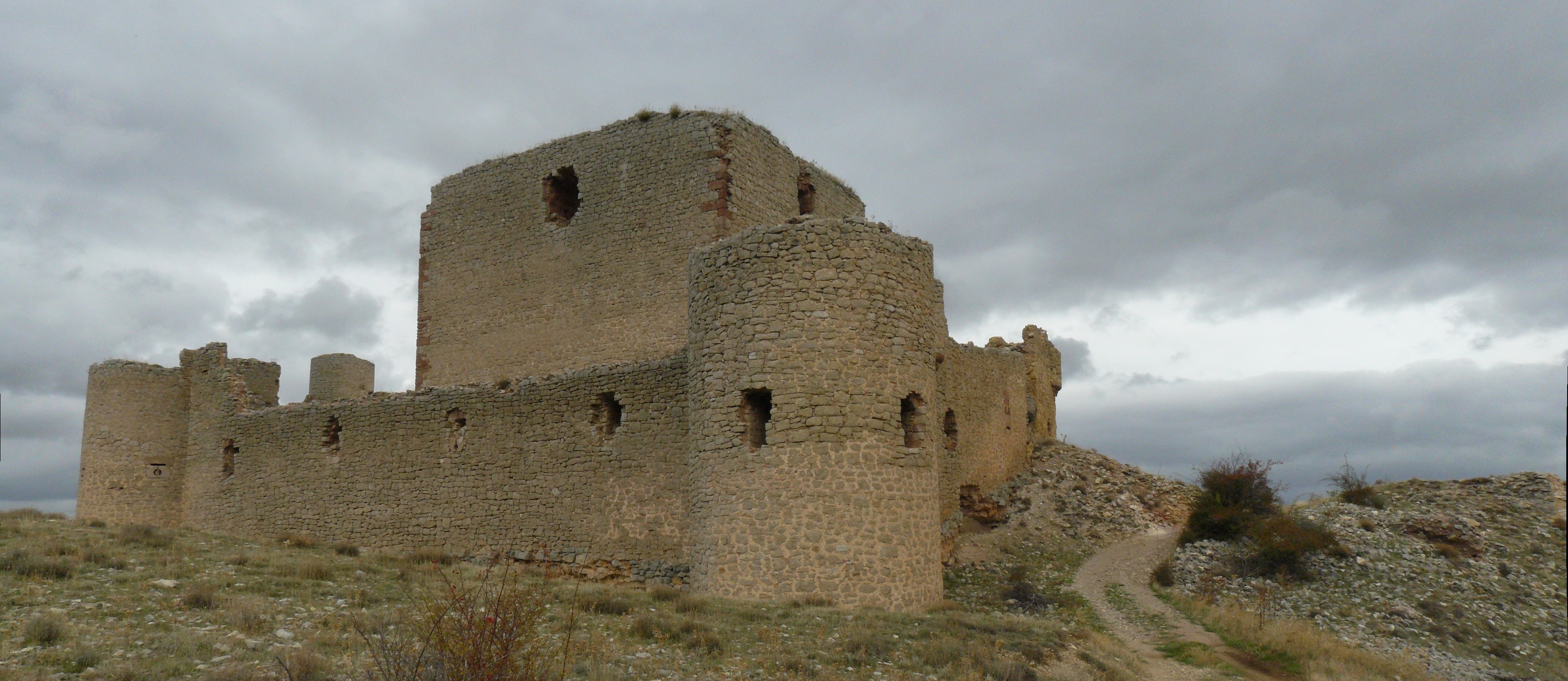
The medieval castle of Caracena was one of the stages of the fights between the Tovar and the Acuña in the 15th century. It was seized and confiscated by Pedro de Acuña, Count of Buendía, who agreed with Fernando de Tovar, lord of Caracena, to demolish it. After the acquisition of the lordship in 1491 by Alfonso Carrillo, lord of Maqueda, the castle was rebuilt according to the techniques of the time, adapting it to the use of artillery.

The town of Caracena and the village of Inés were later sold by the Catholic Monarchs to their Chief-guard, Alfonso Carrillo de Acuña, Lord of Maqueda, a relative of his namesake Archbishop of Toledo, who had taken part in the fighting against Tovar and helped his relatives from the House of Buendía to settle in the Valle de Cerrato region. For this and other reasons, a fierce rivalry was born between the Acuña/Carrillo and the Tovar, which would take place in Palencia as well as in Andalusia. Ferdinand and Isabella ended up condemning Juan de Tovar, confiscating his property, and thus favoring his enemies. The sale of Caracena and Inés took place on 26 March 1491. It was in reality a compensation for the sixteen million maravedis that the Major Commendator of León, Gutierre de Cárdenas, had given to Alfonso Carrillo for the sale of the Toledo village of Maqueda. This amount never reached Carrilho's hands since the Catholic Monarchs requested him to hand over the amounts to finance the last assault on the Kingdom of Granada. In exchange, the monarchs had promised Carrillo they would provide him 1,000 vassals in Soria, and an annual interest of 600,000 maravedis;. Until the vassals were delivered, they would grant him the rents of the town of Molina and the interest of 600,000 maravedis coming from estates in Seville and its borders. Shortly thereafter, Isabella and Ferdinand granted Carrillo the town of Caracena and the village of Inés, (Note: The site of Inés had not been confiscated from Juan de Tovar, since he had given it to his wife Leonor de Vilhena. The Catholic Monarchs acquired it from Francisco and Sancho de Tovar, sons of Juan de Tovar, on 29 November 1488. The document does not show the price of the sale.Franco Silva (1987, p. 520)) as well as the villages of Madruédano, Santa Maria de Val, and Adanta (lands confiscated from Juan de Tovar a few years earlier). In addition to the mentioned places, the Catholic Monarchs also compensated Carillo with one million three hundred thousand maravedis in cash, and an interest of 675,000 maravedis in annual rent, coming from the alcavalas of Alcalá de Guadaira, and other towns and places in the terms of Seville. Thus, from 1491, Caracena and Inés became part of the dominions of Alfonso Carrillo, who soon rebuilt the demolished castle of Caracena, in the dominions of such lordship, following the techniques of the time and adapting it to the use of artillery.

== Further developments ==
Differently from what happened with Caracena, the family managed to keep the Lordship of Cevico. In 1480, Juan de Tovar, Señor of Cevico de la Torre, is mentioned in an execution given in Toledo on March 8 of that year, in favor of him and his wife Leonor de Vilhena, in a plea for the possession of the said village of Cevico they sustained with Diego Manrique and his wife Maria de Tovar. (Note: According to Salazar y Castro, she is a paternal aunt of Juan, sister of his father (according to Salazar y Castro, his grandfather) Sancho de Tovar, both sons of Juan de Tovar, lord of the towns of Cevico and Caracena and chief-guard to John II of Castile and Catarina Manuel.Salazar y Castro (1696, pp. 451–455), "Tabla genealógica de la familia de Tovar, señores de Cevico. [25, fº 115 (2ª foliación)". Biblioteca Digital - Real Academia de la Historia.) The firstborn of the couple, Francisco de Tovar, inherited the Lordship of Cevisco, and married Catalina Enríquez, daughter of Alonso de Monroy and Beatriz de Zuñiga, lords of Velbis. From the union was born Francisco de Tovar (married to Antonia de Vilhena, Queen Leonor of France's Lady), alcalde and captain of La Goleta, in Tunisia, the last Lord of Cevisco in the Tovar line. After his death, for lack of heirs, the landlord was sold to Juan Manuel (married to D. Catarina de Castela) who died between 1535 and 1543. He was also the son of Francisco and Catalina, Alonso de Tovar, Commander of Lobon and Villanueba de la Fuente, in the Order of Santiago, and ambassador in Portugal at the time of Philip II.

Juan de Tovar fled to France in 1490, not before having renounced his patrimonial rights in Bernardino Fernández de Velasco, Constable of Castile, brother-in-law of his cousin, Maria de Tovar, (daughter of the lord of Berlanga, and heiress of the main branch of the Houses of Tovar and Berlanga). His sons Francisco and Sancho de Tovar later protested for the stone of Caracena, with the former even initiating a demand in 1522 to the successor of Alfonso Carrillo, without obtaining any result. In October 1493, his son Francisco Tovar becomes Lord of Cevico de la Torre.

Almost two centuries after these events, Cristóvão Alão de Morais refers to them in his Pedatura Lusitana, published in 1667. Alão begins his work Tobares with Martim Fernandes de Tovar, Lord of Cevico and Caracena: "Castilian nobleman who through murder came to this kingdom", adding in a note: "followed the parts of the King D. A. against the King D. Fr. of Castella, by whose order he was beheaded." Next, regarding his son Sancho de Tovar, whom he says passed to India in the armada of Pedro Álvares Cabral (and who sent him to Sofala), he adds in a note that "he killed the lettered man who ordered his father's beheading because he wanted to lose the Lordship of Cevico". This last information contradicts both the documentation and Salazar y Castro's statement that the Lordship of Cevico did not belong to Sancho, but to his brother Francisco, firstborn of Juan de Tovar, in whose line he followed, and in whose possession, in fact, is documented.

== Descendants ==
According to Salazar y Castro, in his Historia Genealogica de la casa de Lara, Juan de Tovar, there named as Martin Fernandez de Tovar, had, from his wife Leonor de Vilhena:

- Francisco de Tovar, Lord of Cevico, "whose illustrious succession was soon extinguished," entering the village of Cevico by purchase into Casa Manuel;
- Sancho de Tovar, governor of Sofala, with illustrious descent in Portugal, with succession in Castile in the house of the Marquises of Castro-Fuerte and Orellana, and in Portugal in the Counts of Galveias;
- Margarida Manuel, who was Lady of Isabellal I of Castile, and married Inigo López Carrillo de Mendonza, Viceroy of Sardinia, and second son of the lords of Torralva and Beteta. They had Gomez Carrillo, Lord of Ocentejo; and Teresa Carrillo de Mendonza, who married Gomez Davila, first Marquis of Velada, Lord of San Romàn, Villanueva, Guadamora, and Ventosa.

== Bibliography ==
- Ara Gil, Clementina Julia (1985). "Una casa-fuerte medieval en Cevico de la Torre (Palencia)". Boletín del Seminario de Estudios de Arte y Arqueología. 51. Universidad de Valladolid: Servicio de Publicaciones. ISSN 0210-9573.
- Baquero Moreno, Humberto (1980). A Batalha de Alfarrobeira - Antecedentes e Significado Histórico (in Spanish) (2nd ed.). [S.l.]: Biblioteca Geral da Universidade.
- Franco Silva, Alfonso (1987). "Señores y campesinos en tierras de Soria a fines del siglo XV". Homenaje al profesor Juan Torres Fontes (in Spanish). I. [S.l.]: Universidad de Murcia, Secretariado de Publicaciones e Intercambio Científico. pp. 515–531. ISBN 84-7684-053-5.
- Franco Silva, Alfonso (1997). Señores y señoríos: (siglos XIV-XVI) (in Spanish). [S.l.]: Universidad de Jaén. ISBN 9788488942944.
- Salazar y Castro, Luís de (1696). Historia Genealogica de la casa de Lara (in Spanish). I.
- Salazar y Castro, Luís de (1694). Pruebas de la historia de la Casa de Lara (in Spanish). II. [S.l.]: Imprenta Real.
- Suárez Fernández, Luis (1989). Fundamentos de la monarquía (in Spanish). II (2 ed.). [S.l.]: Ediciones Rialp. ISBN 9788432125119.

Preceded by Sancho Fernández de Tovar	House of Tovar; 1500	Succeeded by Sancho de Tovar
Preceded by Sancho Fernández de Tovar	Lordship of Cevico de la Torre; 1465–1489	Succeeded by Confiscated by the Catholic Monarchy
Preceded by Sancho Fernández de Tovar	Lordship of Caracena; 1465–1489	Succeeded by Confiscated by the Catholic Monarchy
