= Manuel Tovar (cartoonist) =

Spanish cartoonist and caricaturist (1875–1935)

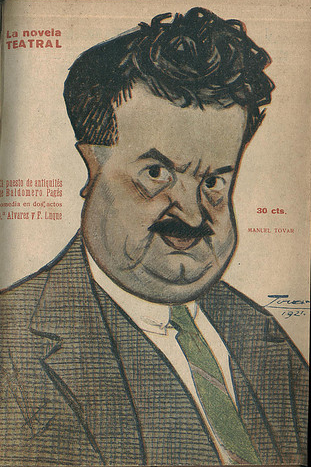
- Self-portrait, 1921
- Born: Manuel Tovar Siles; 10 August 1875; Granada, Spain
- Died: 10 April 1935 (aged 59)
- Occupation: Cartoonist
- Spouse: Concepción Rodríguez
- Children: 2

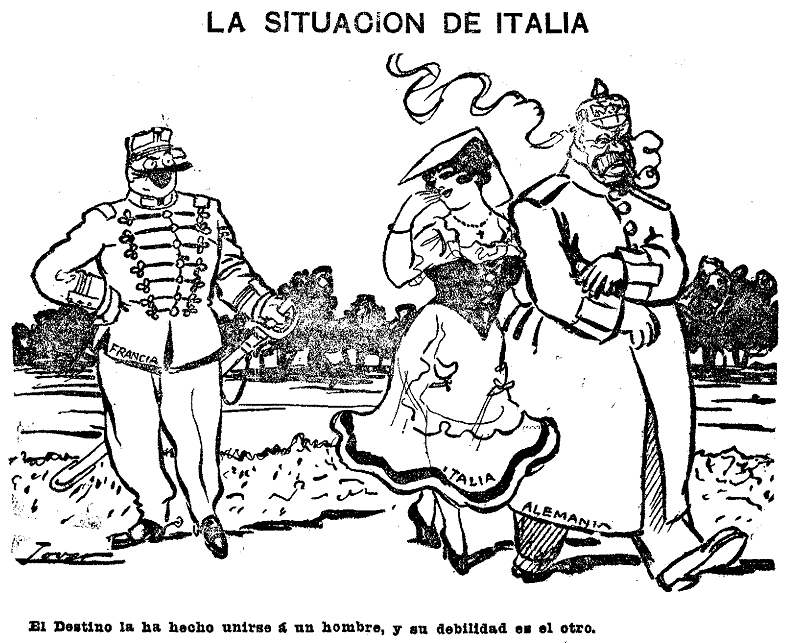
"La situación de Italia", in El Imparcial, 1914.

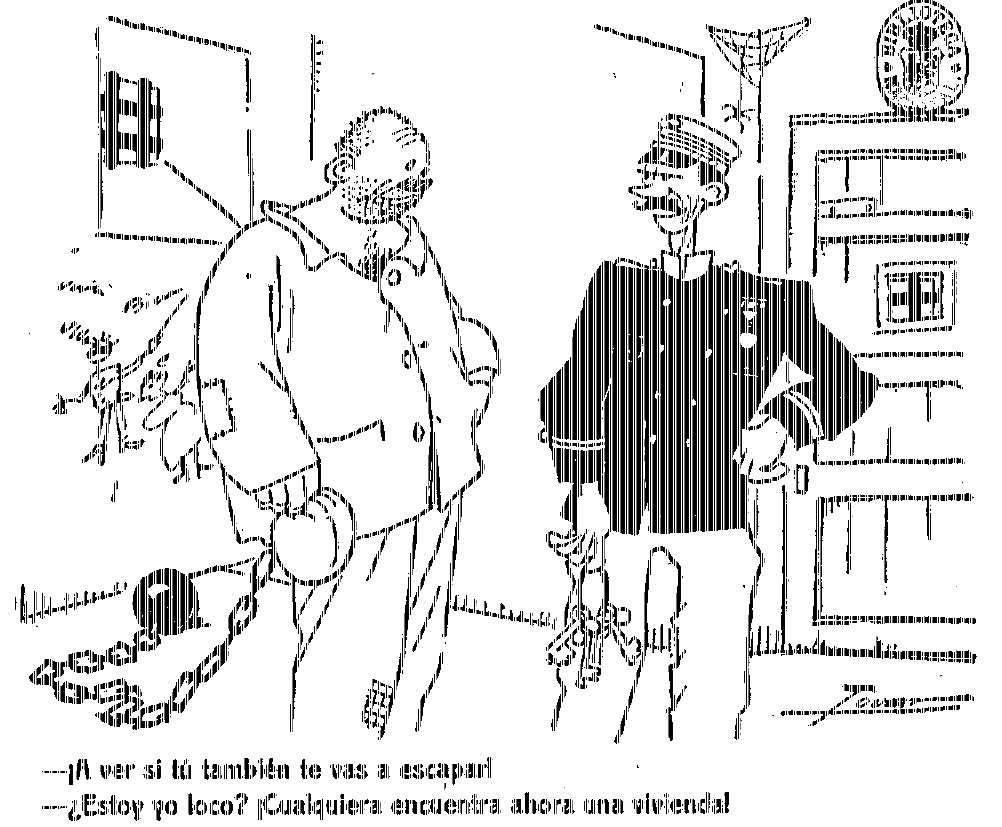
Caricature in La Voz, 1920.

Manuel Tovar Siles (Note: In this Spanish name, the first or paternal surname is Tovar and the second or maternal family name is Siles.) (10 August 1875 – 10 April 1935) was a Spanish cartoonist and caricaturist. In addition to "Tovar", he also signed with the pseudonym "Don Hermógenes".

== Biography ==
Born in Granada, Manuel Tovar was self-taught and was influenced by the artist Ramón Cilla. Despite some early collaborations for magazines in Valencia and Barcelona, he soon moved to Madrid. Tovar drew caricature portraits, political satire, and costumbrismo. He also worked in oil and watercolor painting, though he was less well known in those techniques. His illustrations were published in periodicals like Madrid Cómico, Gedeón, La Correspondencia de España, El Liberal, ABC, El Sol, La Voz, La Esfera, Blanco y Negro, Nuevo Mundo, Mundo Gráfico, Buen Humor, El Imparcial, La Hoja de Parra, Gutiérrez, La Risa, ¡Oiga usted...!, Heraldo de Madrid, España Nueva, La Bandera Federal and Don Quijote, .

== Personal life ==
He married Concepción Rodríguez and had two children, Manuel and Conchita. Tovar is buried in the cemetery of La Almudena.

== Legacy ==
Tovar was described by Mariano Sánchez de Palacios as "one of the most representative figures of the journalistic Madrid of the first quarter-century". The newspaper La Libertad tagged him as "the most popular cartoonist in Madrid".

== Bibliography ==
- García Mínguez, Tana (2007). "Un año de ilustración en 'El Cuento Semanal' (1907) y su posterior influencia". Monteagudo: Revista de literatura española, hispanoamericana y teoría de la literatura (in Spanish) (12). University of Murcia: 67–90. ISSN 0580-6712.
- Pérez Bowie, José Antonio (1996). La novela teatral. Madrid: CSIC. ISBN 84-00-07605-2.
- Pijoán, José; Carrete Parrondo, Juan; Fontbona, Francesc; Bozal, Valeriano; Vega González, Jesusa (1988). Summa Artis: Historia General del Arte. El grabado en España. Espasa-Calpe. ISBN 9788423952748.
- Rodríguez de la Flor, José Luis (1990). El Negociado de incobrables: la vanguardia del humor español en los años veinte. Ediciones de la Torre. ISBN 9788486587536.
- Sánchez de Palacios, Mariano (17 July 1965). "Los que se fueron: Manuel Tovar". ABC (in Spanish): 14.
- Sánchez de Palacios, Mariano (17 October 1969). "Recordando a Tovar". ABC (in Spanish): 131.
- Vegue y Goldoni, Ángel (10 April 1935). "La Voz, de luto". La Voz (in Spanish) (4.446). Madrid: 1. ISSN 2171-2506.
