= Tovar =

Tovar may refer to:

== People ==
- Tovar (surname)
- Tovar, a fictional character from The Strangerhood
- Tovar Perri

== Places ==
- Tobar or Tovar, a Spanish village ruled by the Tovar family in the Middle-Ages, place of origin of the Tovar surname
- Tovar Municipality, Mérida, Mérida (state), Venezuela
- Tovar Municipality, Aragua, Venezuela
  - Colonia Tovar in Tovar Municipality, Aragua
- El Tovar Hotel in Arizona, United States

== See also ==
- Operation Tovar, international operation against computer fraud
- Tova (disambiguation)
