= Jemma Siles =

Australian singer and songwriter

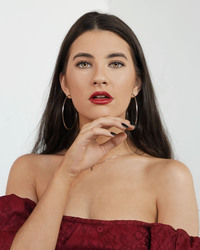
- Jemma Siles in February 2020

Background information
- Born: 8 July 1997 (age 29); Melbourne, Victoria, Australia
- Genres: Pop
- Occupations: Singer; songwriter
- Years active: 2017–present
- Label: Independent
- Website: jemmasiles.com

Jemma Mary Siles (born 8 July 1997) is an Australian singer and songwriter. She won Australian Pop Songwriter of the Year in 2018 and 2019 and Australian Ballad Songwriter of the Year in 2020, which was awarded by APRA AMCOS. In 2017, Siles was featured on the Nervo and Wolfpack track, "Like Air", which has over 3.5 million streams on Spotify. Siles was also a finalist in the Vanda and Young songwriting competition and semi-finalist in the International songwriting competition in 2020.

== Early life ==
Siles was born in 1997 in Melbourne, Victoria. She has been singing since she was six years old and taught herself piano. She has been songwriting since she was 13. Siles attended a few performing arts schools and by the age of 8 she landed the title role in the musical Annie, singing hit songs "Tomorrow" as a solo artist and "I think i'm gonna like it here" alongside Australian-Italian soprano singer Giuseppina Grech at the National Theatre, Melbourne. She continued performing as a solo artist and alongside other artists in front of hundreds of people at festivals and competitions. Siles went on to audition for an elite performing arts company. Her attendance at Patrick Studios Australia allowed her to not only continue to perform in front of these large audiences but also train with professional performers from all over Australia who taught her skills including multiple dance styles, singing and acting.

She landed the role of Dance captain at her Performing Arts High School in 2015 after performing Lead in Godspell as Robin singing the hit song "day by day" in 2014. Siles later had difficult personal battles to overcome which caused her to put a pause on her performance career until late 2016 to early 2017.

== Career ==
Siles initially gained attention after posting a cover on Facebook of Anne-Marie and Clean Bandit's "Rockabye" in January 2017, which was reposted by the Facebook page Radio One Lebanon and reached over half a million views in just a few weeks. She later posted a multitude of videos and reached almost 200,000 views on her own post of "Symphony" by Zara Larsson and Clean Bandit. Siles then went onto work with DJs Olivia Nervo and Miriam Nervo on the track "Like Air", which was released in December 2017. "Like Air" reached over 1.8 million streams on Spotify alone by April 2018.

In May 2018, Siles released her debut single, "D.A.M.N.", which takes influence from Taylor Swift, Tove Lo and George Maple. Siles went on to win Australian Songwriter of the Year 2018 (Contemporary/Pop Dance Category), judged by APRA AMCOS and presented by the ASA.

In late 2018 Siles supported Indiana Massara, Tayler Holder and Zach Clayton on their tour of Australia. They performed at 170 Russel in Melbourne, Royal on the Park Hotel in Brisbane and Astor Theatre in Perth.

Siles released her second single "Light Me Up" in early 2019 and "Out of My Head" near the end of 2019.

She followed this in 2025 with three more singles: "Never Loved", "Nothing to Fear", and "Tell Me All Your Lies". The tracks were included on her debut EP Scripts of Fate, which was released independently on 28 November 2025. The EP consists of six tracks.

== Discography ==
=== Extended plays ===
List of EPs, with selected details and peak chart positions shown
Title	EP details	Peak chart positions
Title	EP details	AUS
Scripts of Fate	Released: 28 November 2025; Label: Jemma Siles	18

== Awards and nominations ==
=== Australian Songwriter of the Year Award ===
Year	Title	Release date	Artist	Awards	Result	Writer/(s)	Producer
2018	"D.A.M.N."	18 May 2018	Jemma Siles	Australian Pop Songwriter of the Year Judged by APRA AMCOS	Won	Jemma Siles	Curtis Hatton & Hamish Keen
2019	"Light Me Up"	31 May 2019	Jemma Siles	Australian Pop Songwriter of the Year Judged by APRA AMCOS	Won	Jemma Siles	Benjamin Oldland
2019	"Out of My Head"	22 November 2019	Jemma Siles	Australian Pop Songwriter of the Year Judged by APRA AMCOS	Finalist Top 5	Jemma Siles	Rob Amoruso & Benjamin Oldland
2020	"Never Loved"	2025	Jemma Siles	Australian Ballad Songwriter of the Year Judged by APRA AMCOS	Won	Jemma Siles & Cyrus Villanueva	Cyrus Villanueva

=== International Songwriting Competition ===
The International Songwriting Competition (ISC) is an annual song contest for both aspiring and established songwriters. The judging panel is made up of musicians, songwriters and industry experts, and songs are judged on creativity, originality, lyrics, melody, arrangement and overall likeability

Year	Title	Artist	Award	Result	Writer/(s)	Producer/(s)	Release date	Ref.
2020	"Merlot"	Jemma Siles	Pop/Top 40	Shortlisted	Jemma Siles & Cam Nacson	Cam Nacson	Unreleased	

=== Vanda and Young Songwriting Competition ===
The Vanda & Young Global Songwriting Competition is an annual competition that "acknowledges great songwriting whilst supporting and raising money for Nordoff-Robbins" and is coordinated by Albert Music and APRA AMCOS.

Year	Title	Artist	Award	Result	Writer/(s)	Producer/(s)	Release date	Ref.
2020	"Merlot"	Jemma Siles	Top 40	Finalist	Jemma Siles & Cam Nacson	Cam Nacson	Unreleased	

=== Personal awards ===
==== APRA AMCOS Professional Development Award ====
Year	Nominee	Award	Result
2021	Jemma Siles	Top 40	Longlisted
