= Alesanco =

- Municipality
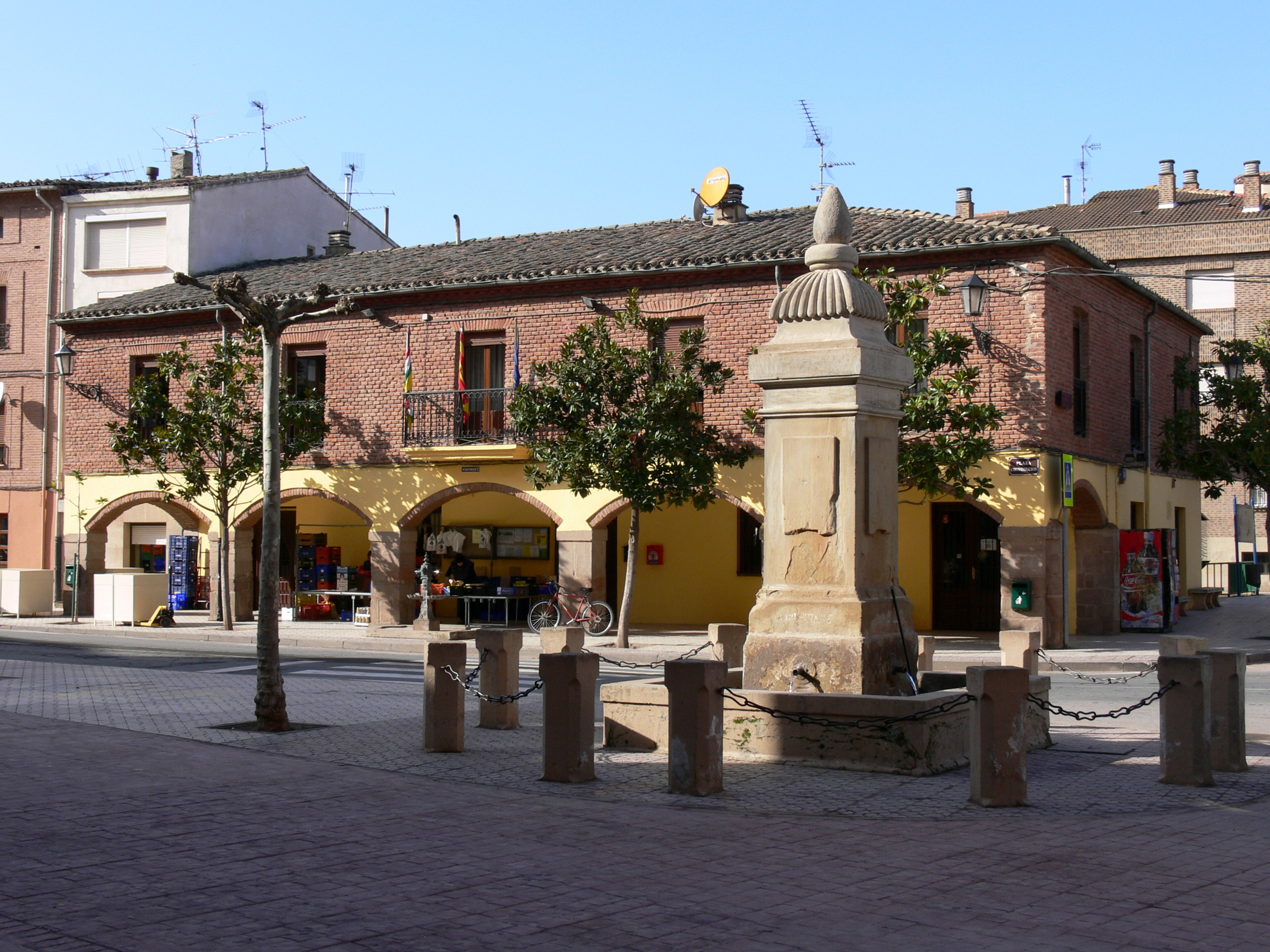
- Constitución square

- Coat of arms

- Location within La Rioja, Spain Location within Spain
- Coordinates: 42°24′51″N 2°49′00″W
- Country: Spain
- Autonomous community: La Rioja
- Comarca: Nájera

Government
  - Mayor: José Antonio Reinares Martínez (PSOE)

Area
  - Total: 17.17 km^{2} (6.63 sq mi)
- Elevation: 565 m (1,854 ft)

Population (2025-01-01)
  - Total: 486
- Demonyms: alesanquino, na
- Postal code: 26324
- Website: Official website

Alesanco is a village in the province and autonomous community of La Rioja, Spain. The municipality covers an area of 17.17 square kilometres (6.63 sq mi) and as of 2011 had a population of 562 people.
