= Sancho de Tovar =

Portuguese explorer (1465–1547)

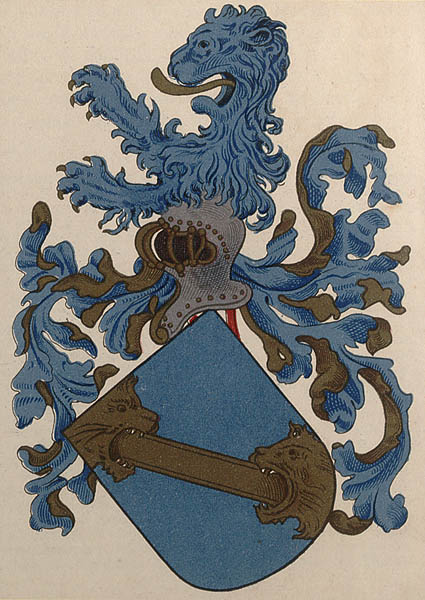
Coat-of-arms of Sancho de Tovar, as it appears in a contemporary nobiliary record.

Sancho de Tovar, 6th Lord of Cevico, Caracena and Boca de Huérgano (c. 1465–1547) was a Portuguese nobleman of Castilian birth, best known as a navigator and explorer during the Portuguese age of discoveries. He was the vice-admiral (soto-capitão) of the fleet that discovered Brazil in 1500, and was later appointed Governor of the East African port-city of Sofala by king Manuel I (List of colonial governors of Mozambique). In this post, he conducted several exploratory missions in the interior regions of present-day Mozambique.

== Early life ==
Sancho de Tovar was born in Cevico (now Cevico de la Torre), Castile, to an old noble house of Visigothic ancestry dating back to the first centuries of the Iberian Reconquista. He was the eldest son of Martín Fernandez de Tovar, 5th Lord of Cevico and Boca de Huérgano, and his wife Leonor de Vilhena, a Portuguese lady of the house of the counts of Olivença. His father's open support for Afonso V of Portugal in his claim to the Castilian throne made him an enemy of Ferdinand and Isabella I of Castile, and he was convicted of high treason and beheaded around 1480, after a long imprisonment. At the age of 20, Sancho avenged the memory of his father by riding to Burgos and stabbing (or, according to some records, mutilating) the judge who had sentenced him to death. He subsequently fled to Portugal, where he was well received by Afonso's successor, king John II. He lived in Lisbon and attended the royal court, where he stood out as a gifted musician and poet (Garcia de Resende collected a few of his songs in his famous Cancioneiro Geral).

== Departure from Lisbon and life as a navigator ==
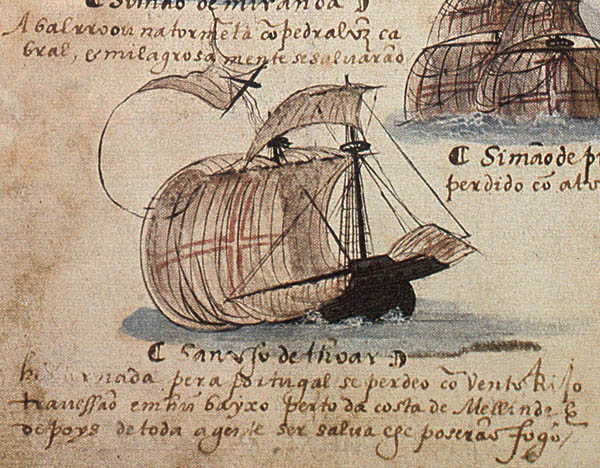
Contemporary depiction of Sancho de Tovar's ship at the time of his voyage to Brazil. It was named El-Rey in honour of king Manuel I, and was stranded during a stom off the coast of Malindi.

After the death of John II, Manuel I succeeded to the throne. The Portuguese effort towards maritime expansion was at its peak, and in 1499 Tovar was appointed by the king himself subcaptain of a large fleet led by Pedro Álvares Cabral, made famous by its discovery of Brazil. The original intentions behind this enterprise are still a matter of speculation: some say it was merely meant as an expedition to India (which had been discovered the year before by Vasco da Gama) and the discovery of Brazil was accidental, but others claim the voyage was carefully pondered and that the existence of Brazil was more or less suspected of (see Controversies about the European discovery of Brazil).

Sancho's ship during this voyage was a nau redonda, a large vessel of 200 tons with a crew of 160 men. These ships were so called because when viewed from the front or rear they appeared round on account of their wide beam and bulging sails (most of the other ships in Cabral's fleet were caravels, and considerably smaller) .

In Brazil, Sancho's fascination with the beauty of the land and his interest in the natives' way of life became apparent to Pero Vaz de Caminha, the fleet's secretary and chronicler, who recorded these impressions in his famous Chronicle of the Discovery of Brazil. He also writes of Sancho's attempt to give wine to the natives, and of their negative reaction to the beverage, and mentions his gift of a boar's tusk to a young Indian . Curiously, Caminha's elder brother Afonso eventually married Sancho's sister Maria de Tovar, giving origin to the Tovar-Caminha family, a secondary branch of the house of Tovar.

As the fleet resumed its supposedly programmed route to India, Sancho de Tovar played an important role on the occupation of the important East African port of Sofala, where his ship eventually stranded. It was then set on fire, in order to prevent its contents from falling into the hands of Muslim pirates. Upon his return to Lisbon, he was put in charge of that city and its surrounding region by the king, a duty that he only performed de facto after his return to Africa in 1515. During his stay in there, Sancho improved and expanded the Portuguese fortress of São Caetano, which had been started by Pero de Anaia in 1505, and organized and led a great number of exploratory missions around the area of present-day Mozambique, Zimbabwe and Madagascar. Although these missions are poorly documented, he is supposed to have been one of the first Europeans ever to contemplate the ruins of Great Zimbabwe (then referred to by the Portuguese as Monomotapa).

He died in Lisbon around the age of 75, and was buried next to his wife in the church of the monastery of Xabregas.

== Marriage and children ==
Sancho de Tovar married Guiomar da Silva, daughter of the Alcaide-Mor (Governor) of Porto de Mós, and had three children.

- Pedro de Tovar, who married Brites de Oliveira e Silva, daughter of Senhores (Lords) de Oliveira. Their son was Sancho de Tovar e Silva (1540–1598), who became Lord of the Honra of Molelos by marriage, was also a navigator. The country's policy, however, had changed towards terrestrial expansion and he eventually embraced military life, having fought at the disastrous battle of Alcácer Quibir alongside king Sebastian I.
- María de Vilhena, who married twice, her first marriage was to the explorer Cristóvão de Mendonça capitão of Ormuz, and her second marriage was to Simão da Silveira, (born 1510) capitão of Ormuz, Diu, and Sofala, and brother of Conde de la Sortella. D. Maria was left a widow by Simão, and she was a major slave owner, possessing the most slaves in Évora, with her testament recording fifteen slaves. Maria's owning a Chinese, 3 Indians, and 3 Mouriscos among her fifteen slaves reflected on her high social status, since Chinese, Mouriscos, and Indians were among the ethnicities of prized slaves and were very expensive compared to blacks, and it was because her husband Simão was involved in the slave trade in the east that she owned slaves of many different ethnicities. She freed twelve of her slaves in her 23 October 1562 testament who were recorded as: a Chinese man named António, three Indian women named Maria Fialha, Genebra, and Catarina, a white woman named Mécia de Abreu, a mulato man named Miguel, a parda woman named Guiomar, a black woman named Margarida, a mourisco woman named Isabel, a mourisco man named Salvador, and the testament does not mention the ethnicities of the men Diogo and Heitor. Her sister D. Leonor was given two of the remaining slaves, Maria and Luís, while the Priests of Our Lady of Mount Carmel (Nossa Senhora do Carmo) were given the slave André. She left the freed slaves sums from 20,000 to 10,000 réis in money. D. Maria owned one of the only two Chinese slaves in Evora and she used him from among the slaves she owned to drive her mules for her since rigorous and demanding tasks were assigned to Mourisco, Chinese, and Indian slaves. She also left her nephews as heirs in her testament, her brother Pedro de Tovar's son Sancho de Tovar and her sister D. Leonor de Vilhena's son, Sancho de Faria. She had no children from her marriage to Cristóvão de Mendonça. The Convent of Carmo (Convento do Carmo (Évora)) was a beneficiary of instructions in the testament of Maria de Vilhena. Francisco de Faria was the paternal nephew of Maria de Vilhena. Foundation guides were left in her testament for the Convent. The presbytery of Our Lady of Mount Carmel (Nossa Senhora do Carmo) in 1562 received funds from Maria de Vilhena.
- Leonor de Vilhena, (born 1540) who married Antão de Faria (born 1530), alcaide-mór of Palmela (son de Francisco de Faria, Alcaide-mor de Palmela and Senhor de Evoramonte, and Joana de Silva e Castro). They had a son, Sancho de Faria (born 1560).

== See also ==
- Carreira da Índia
- 2nd Portuguese India Armada (Cabral, 1500)
- Age of Discoveries
- Portuguese Empire
- Controversies about the European discovery of Brazil
- Pero Vaz de Caminha
- Pedro Álvares Cabral
- Juan de Tovar y Toledo
- Juan de Tovar
- Sancho de Tovar e Silva
- Villamartín de Don Sancho
