= Alonso Miguel de Tovar =

Spanish painter (1678–1752)

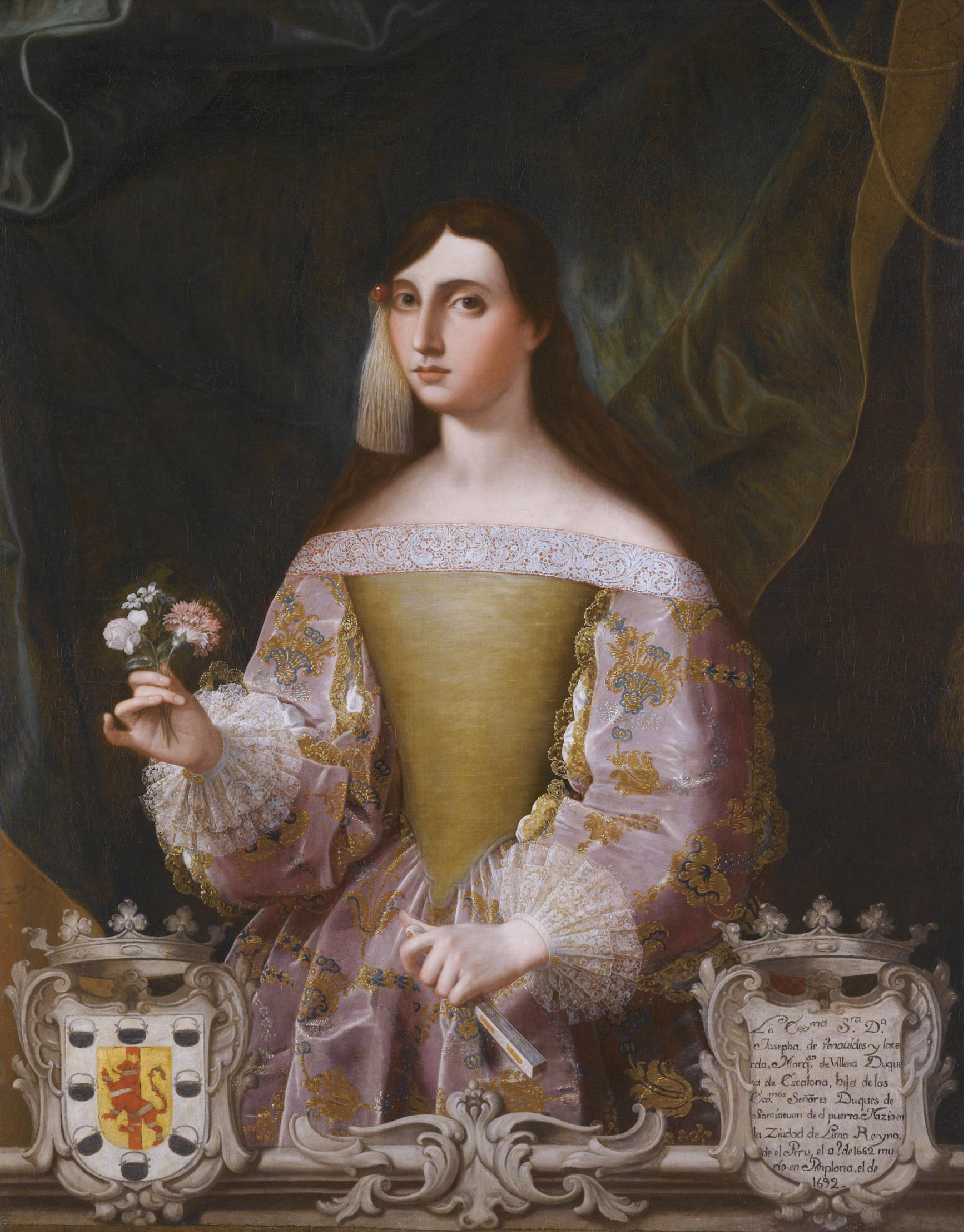
Doña Josepha Benavides, Marquise of Villena, by Alonso Miguel de Tovar

Alonso Miguel de Tovar, sometimes (less correctly) called Tobar (1678–1752) was a Spanish baroque painter, appointed court painter by Philip V in 1723.

== Early career ==
Alonso Miguel de Tovar was born in Higuera de la Sierra, near Aracena. in 1678, to a secondary and empoverished branch of the illustrious Tovar family, of the Lords of Tovar, later Marquesses of Berlanga. He trained in Seville under Juan Antonio Ossorio and Juan Antonio Fajardo, having executed numerous religious paintings, including Our Lady of Consolation with Saints Francis, James and a Clerical Donor (1720), in the Seville Cathedral, and St Francis Receiving the Stigmata (c. 1720), in the Royal Academy of San Fernando, Madrid. He was named pintor de cámara to King Felipe V in April 1729, taking the place of Teodoro Ardemans. In both of these the influence of Murillo is discernible: the colouring is vivid and the drawing precise, if slightly rigid, and both works show what has been called a gentle and uncomplicated piety, differing to some extent from the tradition of Spanish religious painting.

He painted a canvas of Nuestra Señora del Consuelo in 1720 for a church in Seville. He returned to Madrid in 1734, where he died.

== Career as court painter ==
Tovar was appointed court painter in 1729, when the Spanish court moved to Seville, taking the place of Teodoro Ardemans. There he collaborated with Jean Ranc, probably painting replicas of the latter's portraits. His own portraits include Portrait of a Young Girl (1732), now in Meiningen, at Schloss Elisabethenburg. In 1733 he travelled with the court when it returned to Madrid, and he may have worked as an assistant to Louis-Michel van Loo. Tovar also probably painted the theme of the Holy Shepherd, popular with Sevillian artists of his time. Of the paintings of the subject attributed to him, however, only the one in the church at Cortelazor, near Aracena, signed in 1748, is considered authentic.
