= Juan de Tovar y Toledo =

Spanish aristocrat

Don Juan de Tovar y Toledo, 3rd Lord of Cevico and Boca de Huérgano and later 1st Lord of Caracena (c.1370-1415) was a Castilian nobleman and military leader, the eldest son of Fernán Sancho de Tovar, 2nd Lord of Cevico, and his wife Teresa de Toledo, and great-grandfather of Portuguese-naturalized navigator and explorer Sancho de Tovar.

Ruins of Juan de Tovar's castle at Boca de Huérgano, known as Torreón de los Tovar

== Military career ==
At the age of 20, Juan de Tovar y Toledo joined the army of Henry III of Castile and took part in the Reconquista, having fought at the Battle of Collejares. He is also likely to have participated in most of the king's unsuccessful attempts to seize Granada. Because of his deeds in battle he was offered the domains of Caracena and appointed Guarda Mayor (chief of the king's personal guard) by Henry's successor, John II of Castile.

He also built the fortification that came to be known as Torreón de los Tovar, at Boca de Huérgano.

== Marriage and children ==
Around 1390 Juan de Tovar y Toledo married Sancha Manoel, daughter of the 1st Count of Seia. He married Constanza Henriquez after she died. Juan de Tovar, their son, was the 4th Lord of Cevico and Boca de Huérgano.

== See also ==
- Sancho de Tovar
