= Battle of Collejares =

Battle in 1406

- Part of the Reconquista
- Map of the Reino Nazari de Granada.
Date	1406
Location	Collejares, Úbeda and Baeza, Granada, Spain
Result	Castilian victory

Belligerents
Crown of Castile	Emirate of Granada

Commanders and leaders
Henry III of Castile	Muhammad VII

The Battle of Collejares also known as the Battle of los Collejares was a battle of the Spanish Reconquista that took place in 1406 at Collejares nearby the towns of Úbeda and Baeza in Granada, Spain. The battle was fought between the Kingdom of Castile, whose forces were commanded by Henry III of Castile, and the Emirate of Granada, whose troops were commanded by Sultan Muhammad VII.

== Battle ==
The Kingdom of Castile had signed a peace treaty with the Nasrid dynasty who controlled the Emirate of Granada. Power struggles and changes in the court of the Emirate of Granada prompted them to break the cease fire. Muhammad VII, encouraged and aided by the Marinid Dynasty of Morocco, invaded the territory of Murcia. Henry III of Castile, who had completed a series of battles against Portugal, saw his opportunity to counter the Granadan threat after signing a peace treaty with the Portuguese in 1402. One of the more famous Castilian knights that participated in this campaign was Juan de Tovar y Toledo, who was given land and title in part for his actions at Collejares. Henry III moved against Granada, the last Muslim stronghold on the Iberian Peninsula after centuries of Reconquista. The two armies met in the area around Collejares, localized near the towns of Úbeda and Baeza. The Castilian forces were able to rout the forces of the Emirate of Granada. Henry III would die a few months later in December 1406.
