= Siles =

Siles may refer to:

== People ==
- Jemma Siles (b. 1997), Australian singer/songwriter
- Hernando Siles Reyes (b. 1882), 31st President of Bolivia, 27th Vice President of Bolivia
- Hernán Siles Zuazo (b. 1914), 46th President of Bolivia, 31st Vice President of Bolivia
- Luis Adolfo Siles Salinas (b. 1925), 49th President of Bolivia
- Gome de Siles, Spanish noble and knight during the reign of Charles V, Holy Roman Emperor

== Places ==
- Estadio Hernando Siles, a sports stadium in La Paz, Bolivia
- Hernando Siles Province, in the Chuquisaca Department, Bolivia
- Puerto Siles, a town and municipality in Yacuma Province in the Beni Department of northern Bolivia
- Siles, Jaén, a town in Andalusia, Spain
