= Comarca de Nájera =

Nájera
- Comarca
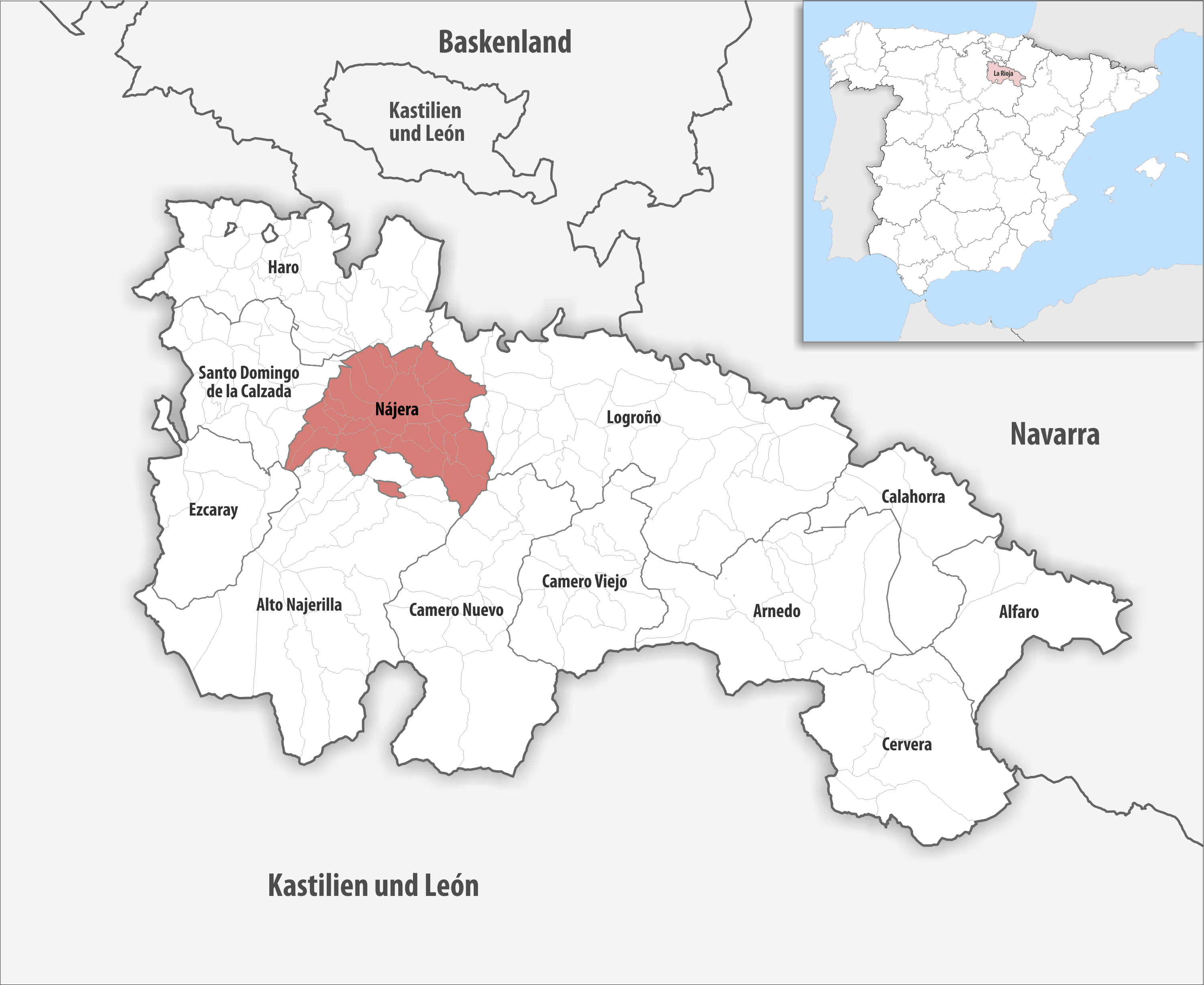
- Nájera in Map
- Interactive map of Nájera
- Coordinates: 42.391167°N 2.7555°W
- Country: Spain

Nájera is a comarca in La Rioja province in Spain.
