= Radio One (Lebanon) =

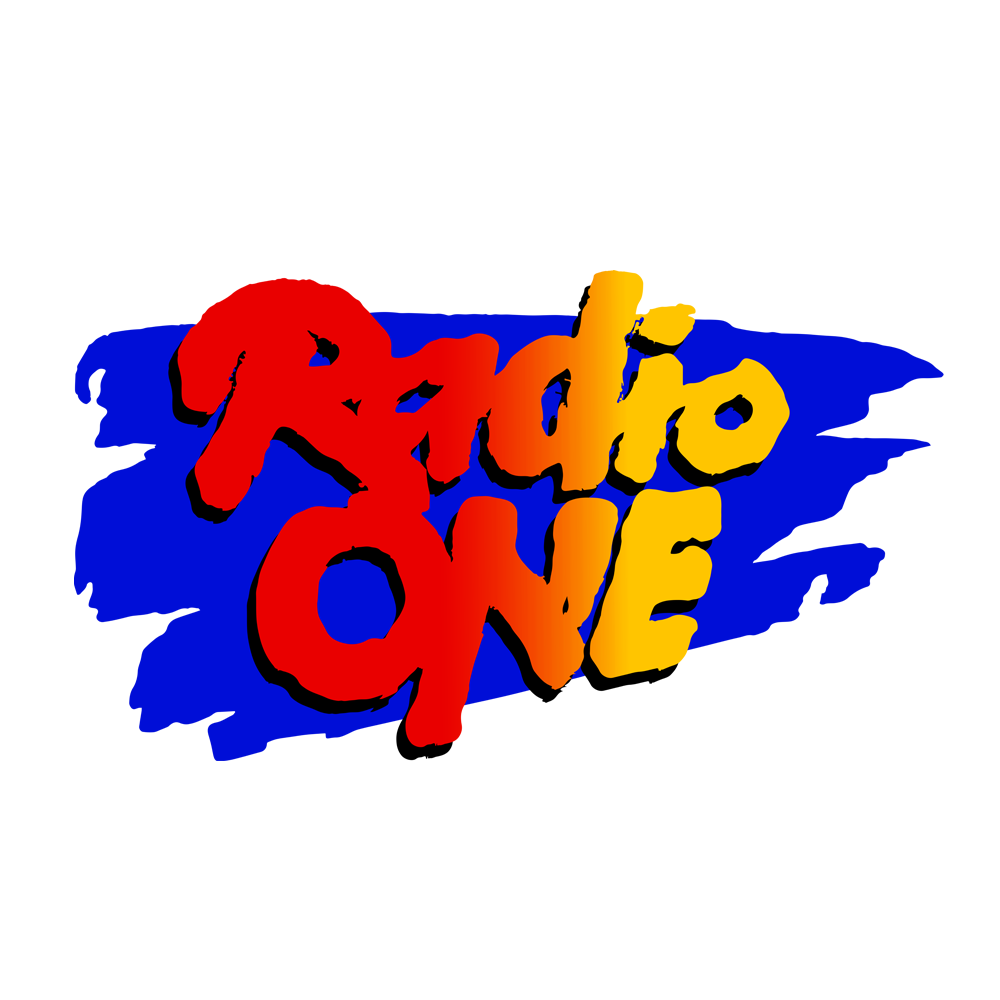

Lebanon
- Broadcast area: Lebanon
- Frequencies: 105.1 & 105.5 MHz
- RDS: [RADIOONE]
- Branding: Radio One

Programming
- Language: English
- Format: Top 40

Ownership
- Owner: Raymond Gaspar

History
- First air date: 1983
- Last air date: February 1, 2020

Technical information
- ERP: 25 kW

Radio One was a radio station that served Lebanon, broadcasting on the FM band before it closed down on 1 February 2020 as a result of the Lebanese liquidity crisis. The station was licensed to broadcast all over Lebanon, from studios in Beit Meri. It was one of the many FM stations that launched during the civil war in Lebanon playing international pop music, as well as oldies.

== History ==
Radio One was founded in 1983 by Raymond Gaspar as CEO and Roger Gaspar as program director. The station played international music 24 hours a day, 7 days a week.

Longtime host Gavin Ford, a British national, died at age 53 on 27 November 2018, after he had been tied up, beaten and fatally strangled inside his Beit Meri home. Two Syrian men were arrested on 28 November after some of Ford's belongings were found in their Beirut apartment. One suspect confessed to Ford's murder and both men having targeted his house beforehand for a robbery attempt. Ford had been an on-air personality for Radio One since 1996.

The station closed down on 1 February 2020 following the Lebanese financial crisis. The radio faced financial difficulties that led to its discontinuing and to stopping the broadcast of its programs.

== Air personalities ==
- Gavin Ford
- Olga Habre
- Clint Maximus
- Stephanie Andriotis

== Shows ==
- Gavin ford in the morning
- The Maximus Experience
- Monday night love songs
- Radio One Classics
- Remember Yesterday with Kevin
- The Chillout Lounge with Alan
- Rockin' on Radio One with Randi
