= Boca de Huérgano =

Boca de Huérgano Boca de Güérganu
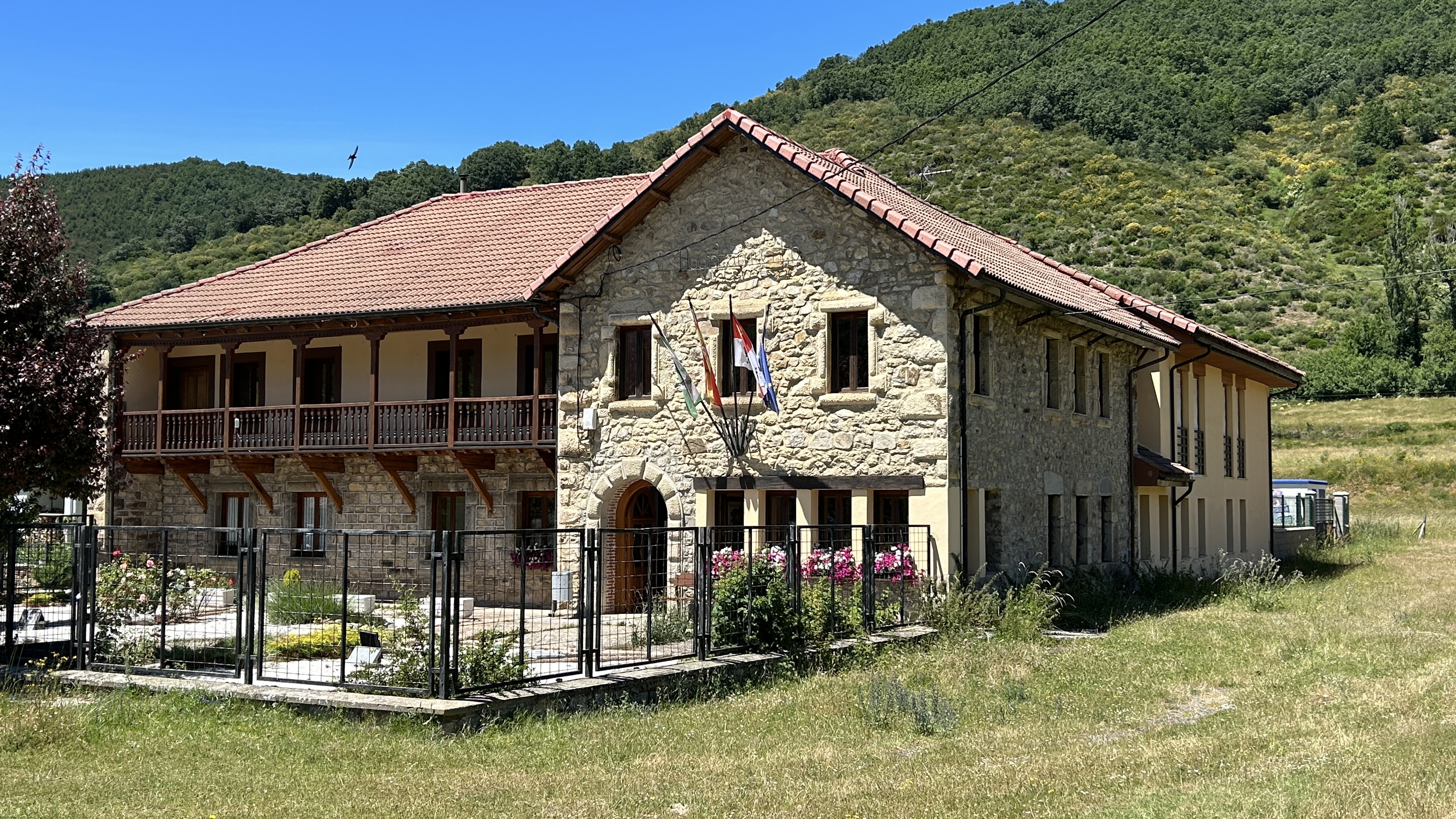
- Town hall

- Flag Coat of arms

- Location within Spain
- Coordinates: 42°58′25″N 4°55′39″W
- Country: Spain
- Autonomous community: Castile and León
- Province: León
- Municipality: Boca de Huérgano

Government
  - Mayor: Tomás de la Sierra González (PP)

Area
  - Total: 291.84 km^{2} (112.68 sq mi)
- Elevation: 1,111 m (3,645 ft)

Population (2025-01-01)
  - Total: 412
  - Density: 1.41/km^{2} (3.66/sq mi)
- Time zone: UTC+1 (CET)
  - Summer (DST): UTC+2 (CEST)
- Postal Code: 24911
- Telephone prefix: 987
- Website: Boca de Huérgano

Boca de Huérgano (Spanish: [ˈboka ðe ˈweɾɣano]; Leonese: Boca de Güérganu) is a village and municipality located in the Montaña Leonesa of province of León, Castile and León, Spain. According to the 2010 census (INE), the municipality has a population of 531 inhabitants.
