= House of Tovar =

House of medieval Castilian nobility

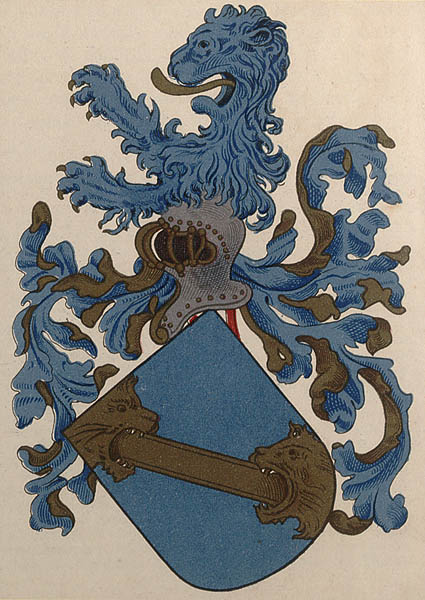
Tovar coat of arms.

The House of Tovar is a lineage of medieval Castilian nobility, with origins traditionally associated with the time of Ferdinand III of Castile and traced back to Fernão Sanches de Tovar.

== Origin ==
According to Josep Pellicer de Tovar, chief chronicler to Charles II of Spain, (Note: One of the few sources on the history of this house is Josep Pellicer de Tovar, chief chronicler to Charles II of Spain. He describes it in his work Memorial de la Calidad y servicios de las casas que posee D. Fernando de Tovar Enriquez de Castilla, written on behalf of D. Fernando de Tovar. The purpose of the work was to demonstrate to the monarch the distinction of Fernando and the house to which he belonged, in support of his request for the title of Marquis of Villamartín.) the history of the House of Tovar dates back to the early 13th century when a knight named Sancho Fernández de Tovar was granted the town of Tovar by Ferdinand III of Castile in 1218. His grandson, also named Sancho Fernández de Tovar, served as chief chamberlain to Sancho IV of Castile.

== 14th century ==
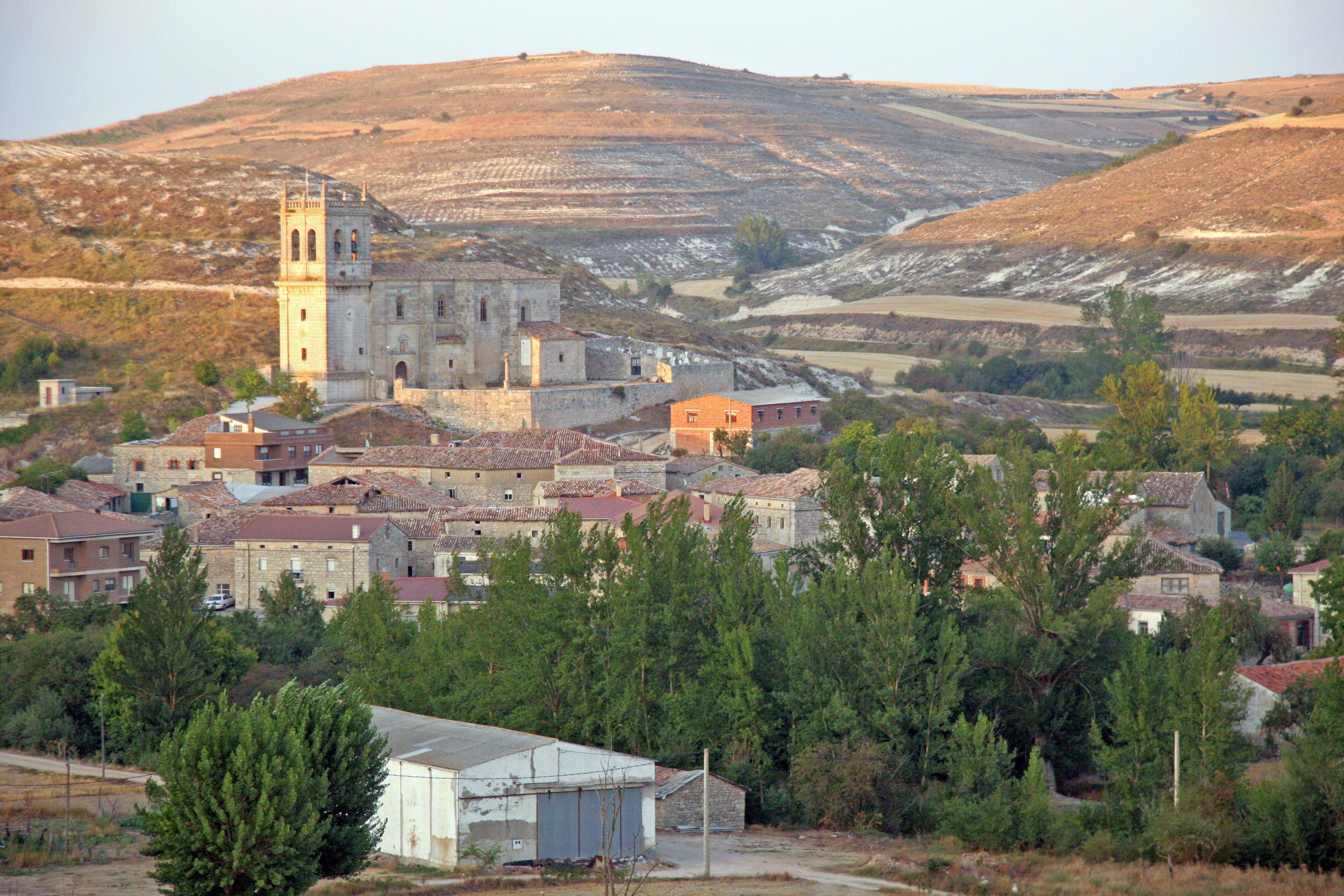
View of the town of Tobar, landlord of the Tovars.

Although Pellicer traces the origins of the House to the 13th century, the first documented member appears only a century and a half later, with Fernão Sanches de Tovar, Admiral Major of Castile. His fate, like that of his family, is closely tied to the claims to the throne by Henry of Trastámara.

Until 1364, Fernão Sanches de Tovar was a staunch supporter of Pedro I of Castile, who entrusted him with significant positions, such as Advance-Major of Castile in 1360 and Frontier-Major of Murcia in 1364. However, from that year onward, he switched allegiance to Henry of Trastámara, abandoning Pedro I. In 1366, Henry rewarded him with the town of Astudillo for his support. After defeating Pedro I, Henry appointed Fernão as his chief guard and, in 1370, granted him the town of Gelves in the Guadalquivir valley. Fernão became one of Henry II's most trusted figures, eventually being entrusted with the supreme command of the Castilian fleet in 1377 and later named his executor.

As an admiral, Fernão achieved significant victories in Flanders and along the British coast, delivering notable defeats to England in its ports and the English Channel. Following Henry II's death, he sailed up the Thames, setting fire to Gravesend, now a district of London. The following year, he served John I of Castile during the third war with Portugal since the previous reign. In the summer of 1381, he defeated the Portuguese fleet at Saltes, later blocking the mouth of the Tagus River and preventing English reinforcements from arriving. This action played a key role in the peace agreement of 1382 between John I of Castile and Ferdinand I of Portugal.

After the death of Ferdinand I of Portugal, Fernão supported John I of Castile's claim to the Portuguese throne as the husband of Beatriz, Ferdinand I's only daughter and heir. During the Siege of Lisbon in 1384, while commanding the Castilian fleet, he succumbed to the plague. His son, Juan Fernández de Tovar, inherited the position of Admiral Major as well as the lordships of Astudillo and Gelves. However, he survived only a year, dying in the Battle of Aljubarrota.

== Landlord of Berlanga ==
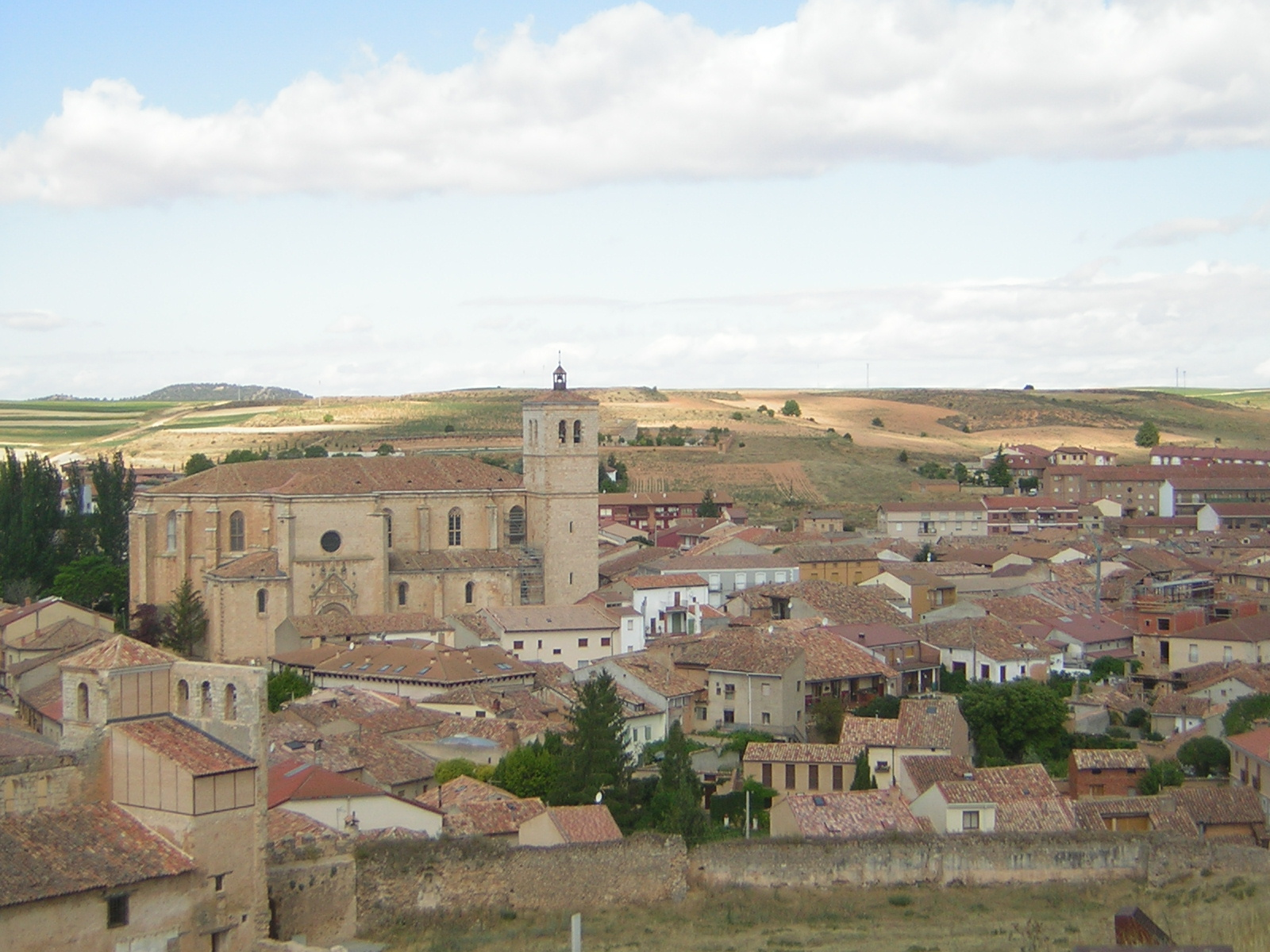
View of Berlanga de Duero.

The history of Berlanga de Duero, in the Bishopric of Osma, is closely tied to that of the House of Tovar. In 1380, John I of Castile ordered the return of this town to Juan Fernández de Tovar, son of Admiral Major Fernão Sanches de Tovar, and his wife Leonor of Castile. Previously, the town had been part of the extensive domains of Henry II of Castile's brother, Count Telo, lord of Biscay and the House of Lara, who died in 1370 without legitimate heirs. This allowed the monarch to incorporate the domains into the Castilian Crown, ceding them to his firstborn, the future John I.

One of Count Telo's illegitimate daughters, Leonor de Castilla, married to Juan Fernández de Tovar, was named along with her sister Constança as heir to the towns of Berlanga, Aranda, and Peñaranda de Duero in her father's will. Her half-brother, Henry II, was charged with executing the will. Initially, the monarch confirmed Berlanga's possession to Leonor and her husband. However, shortly before his death, he took control of the town, citing the lack of legitimate descendants of Count Telo, and gave it to Henry of Castile, the first Duke of Medina-Sidonia. He promised Leonor compensation with another town.

After Henry II's death, Juan Fernández de Tovar filed a case with the Royal Audiencia against Henry of Castile, demanding the return of Berlanga and compensation of 40,000 maravedis for the rents Henry had received during his tenure as lord of the town. Seeking to maintain good relations with the Tovars, who had provided valuable services to the Crown, John I returned Berlanga to the family.

Upon Juan's death, the towns of Berlanga (acquired through marriage) and those of Astudillo and Gelves (granted by royal donation) were passed to his son, Fernán Sánchez de Tovar. Fernán married Marina de Castañada and died in 1415, leaving a will dated August 28 of the same year. He requested burial in a Franciscan habit at the convent of Santa Clara in Astudillo and left a silver gilt chalice and two “pitanzas” to the nuns. Fernán's will, dated May 14, 1422, directed that he also be buried in the same convent alongside his wife. He left various pious legacies and named his five children—Juan, Leonor, Iñigo López, Sancho, and Diego—as heirs, with his firstborn, Juan de Tovar, inheriting the three towns under his lordship.

Around 1411, Juan de Tovar, the third lord of Berlanga, obtained permission from his father to emancipate himself by marrying Constanza Enríquez, daughter of Admiral Alonso Enríquez and Juana de Mendoza, thereby linking the lordship of Berlanga to one of Castile's most powerful lineages. The marriage agreements, established in 1410, included a dowry of 10,000 florins for the bride and a payment of 5,000 florins in arras by the groom. Additionally, it was agreed that, should the marriage dissolve, the Admiral would transfer the place of Belver, near Villalpando in Zamora, to the Tovars. In return, the Tovars would pay the Admiral 350,000 maravedis for the location. Juan also granted the town of Gelves to his wife, which she would retain until the arras were paid.

== Bibliography ==
- Franco Silva, Alfonso (1989). "Aportacion al estudio de los señorios sorianos. El caso de Berlanga de Duero y los Tovar" [Contribution to the study of the lordships of Soria. The case of Berlanga de Duero and the Tovar family.] (PDF). Mayurqa. 22. Archived from the original (PDF) on 2024-12-01.
