= Jorge Tovar =

Mexican painter, sculptor, cartoonist and artist (1922–2023)

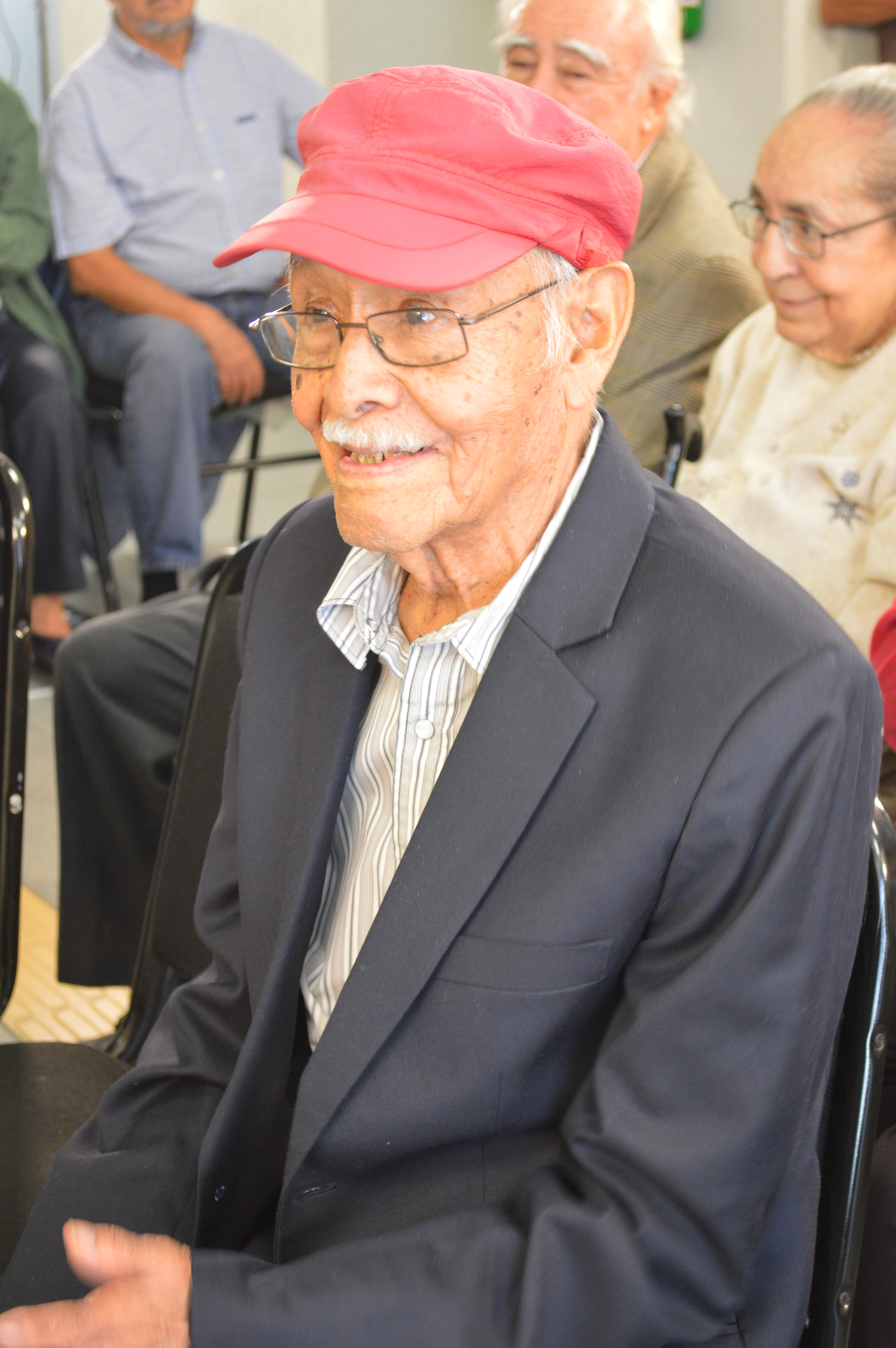
- Tovar at an exhibition at the Televisión Educativa in Mexico City
- Born: Jorge Tovar Santana; 1 February 1922; Mexico City, Mexico
- Died: February 2023 (aged 101); Villa Coapa, Mexico
- Education: Academy of San Carlos

Jorge Tovar Santana (1 February 1922 – February 2023) was a Mexican painter, sculptor, cartoonist and landscape artist.

== Background ==
Tovar was born in the Santa Maria la Ribera neighborhood in Mexico City on 1 February 1922. In 1940, the government of the State of Mexico gave him a scholarship to study at the Academy of San Carlos, graduating in 1945. He currently lives in his studio-apartment in Villa Coapa, Mexico City. Tovar turned 100 in February 2022, and died in Villa Coapa in February 2023, at the age of 101.

== Career ==
Tovar collaborated with the Excélsior newspaper, especially with journalist Ana Cecila “Bambi” Traviño, writing about art and related events, interviewing artists. He also drew political cartoons. He was a contributor to the publication La Nueva Picardía Mexicana (New Mexican Mischief, 1960), a book by Armando Jiménez, documenting Mexican customs in over twenty-five illustrations. He created comics called El nieto del Ahuizotle (The Grandson of Ahuizotle) and El Nahual (The Nahual) . His most notable sculpture is La Mujer Tehuana (The Tehuana Woman), related to a common theme in his work, indigenous women, and also created the Hidalgo monument located in the Independence Garden of Torreón, Coahuila. He has had numerous exhibitions of his work in Mexico, including in the Salón de la Plástica Mexicana. He worked as an art teacher in various primary and middle schools, as well as the Normal Rural de Xochiapulco de la Sierra teachers’ college and the Academy of San Carlos (today the Facultad de Artes y Diseño), from which he has since retired.

Along with Mexican painter Jorge Olvera, Tovar founded the School of Fine Arts of Chiapas. He also work on various cultural projects related to the state, promoting its traditional masks, founding the Ballet Bonampark, founding Tuxtla Gutiérrez’s first carnival and more. In 1949 he was invited to become a founding member of the Salón de la Plástica Mexicana by art promoter Fernando Gamboa, of which he remains an active member. In 1955, he founded the Artistas Plásticos Asociados (Associated Fine Artists), along with Vargas and Liuva Kent, with the aim of supporting artists needing money.

== Artistry ==
He is an admirer of French artists Daumier and Gustave Courbet, as well as Van Gogh, but most of all of Diego Rivera, because of his role in the Mexican Muralism movement. His works are generally social commentary in one form or another, believing that all art is political. He has stated that he never painted for sales but rather to state his thoughts on what is going on in Mexico, causing a number of Mexican galleries to reject his work. He believes that those who find a style that sells and stick to his become "apathetic, indifferent" and "stop being faithful to themselves". Common themes in his work include war, daily life in Tzotzil communities, maternity and the beauty of indigenous women of Mexico. He is a defender of drawing and of traditional figurative depictions, and has spoken out for artists whose work are rejected by galleries because they do not fit with what is fashionable.

== Recognition ==
In 2003, he received the Tlacuilo Prize from the National Watercolor Museum of Mexico for his life's work.
