= Castroponce =

Coordinates: 42°08′N 5°11′W

Castroponce, Spain
- Coat of arms

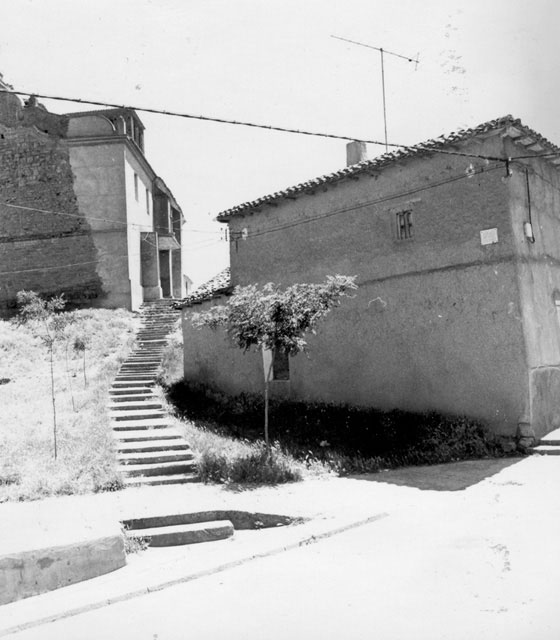
- Country: Spain
- Autonomous community: Castile and León
- Province: Valladolid
- Municipality: Castroponce

Area
  - Total: 24 km^{2} (9.3 sq mi)

Population (2025-01-01)
  - Total: 128
  - Density: 5.3/km^{2} (14/sq mi)
- Time zone: UTC+1 (CET)
  - Summer (DST): UTC+2 (CEST)

Castroponce is a municipality located in the province of Valladolid, Castile and León, Spain. According to the 2004 census (INE), the municipality has a population of 173 inhabitants.
