= Sancho de Tovar e Silva =

Sancho de Tovar e Silva, jure uxoris Lord of the Honra of Molelos (1551 – April 13, 1629) was a Portuguese nobleman and military man most notable for having been among the few companions of King Sebastian of Portugal who survived the disastrous Battle of Alcácer Quibir. He was later governor of Diu on behalf of Philip III of Portugal and held the rank of Almirante-mór (Chief Admiral) in the Portuguese Navy.

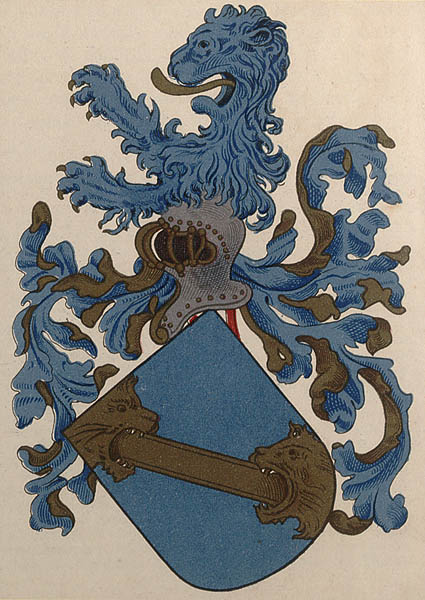
Coat of Arms of the Tovar family

== Family and career ==
Sancho de Tovar e Silva was born to an old noble house of Castilian origin, dating back to the first centuries of the Iberian Reconquista.

He was the son of Pedro de Tovar (1509–1567), Vedor da Fazenda (Overseer of Finances) of Portuguese India, and his wife Brites de Oliveira e Silva, daughter of the Lords of Oliveira . His paternal grandfather was Sancho de Tovar, the Castilian-born navigator and explorer who took part in the discovery of Brazil.

From 1572 onwards, Tovar e Silva held the position of Copeiro-mór (Master of Ceremonies) at the royal court in Lisbon, and around that time he became Lord of the Honour of Molelos by marriage to Maria da Veiga e Nápoles, a wealthy heiress descended from a cadet branch of the royal house of Anjou.

In 1578, together with most of the courtesan nobility, he accompanied the 24-year-old king Sebastian in his attempted Moroccan crusade, having been one of the few aristocrats to survive the encounter that opposed the Portuguese army to that of the sultan Abu Marwan Abd al-Malik I on the morning of August 4. He was, nevertheless, severely injured: according to 18th century genealogist Felgueiras Gayo, he returned covered in wounds, and contemporary authors record that he lost his right arm or hand in the battle.

In 1622 Sancho was appointed governor of Diu on behalf of Philip III of Portugal in and later held the honorary position of Almirante-mór (Chief Admiral) of the Portuguese navy.

He died in his Paço (Palace) of Molelos, at the age of 78, supposedly murdered by a disgruntled servant whom he had caught stealing (and subsequently fired) a few days before.
