= Cevico de la Torre =

Coordinates: 41°51′N 4°24′W

Cisneros
- municipality
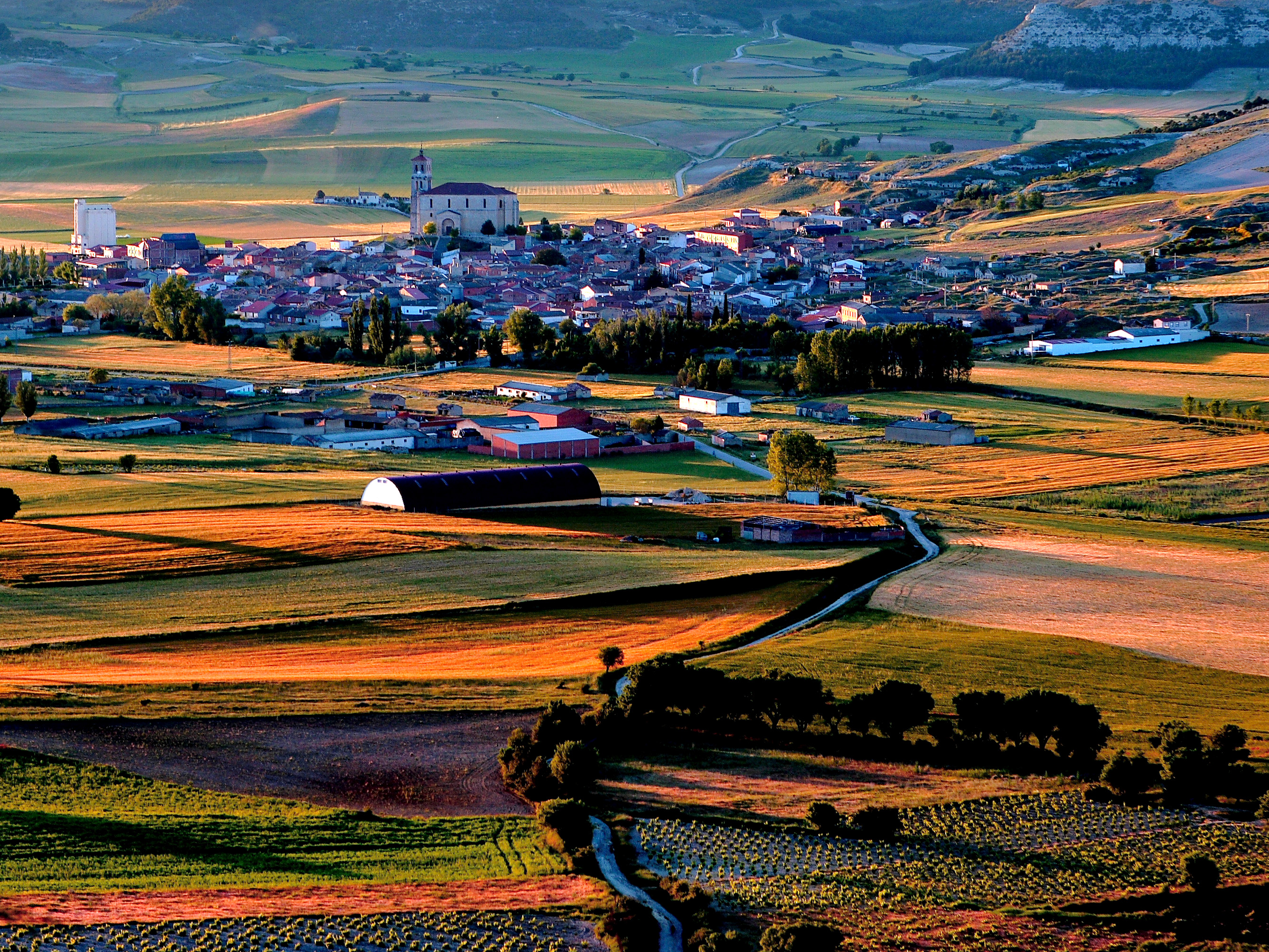

- Coat of arms
- Interactive map of Cisneros
- Country: Spain
- Autonomous community: Castile and León
- Province: Palencia
- Municipality: Cevico de la Torre

Area
  - Total: 50.85 km^{2} (19.63 sq mi)

Population (2025-01-01)
  - Total: 464
  - Density: 9.12/km^{2} (23.6/sq mi)
- Time zone: UTC+1 (CET)
  - Summer (DST): UTC+2 (CEST)
- Website: Official website

Cevico de la Torre is a Spanish municipality belonging to the province of Palencia, in the northern part of the autonomous community of Castile and León.

== Geography ==
=== Location ===
Cevico borders Hontoria de Cerrato to the north, Valle de Cerrato and Vertavillo to the east, Alba de Cerrato, Población de Cerrato and Cubillas de Cerrato to the south, and the Province of Valladolid and Dueñas to the west.
