= Tobar =

Coordinates: 42.483°N 3.933°W

- Municipality and town
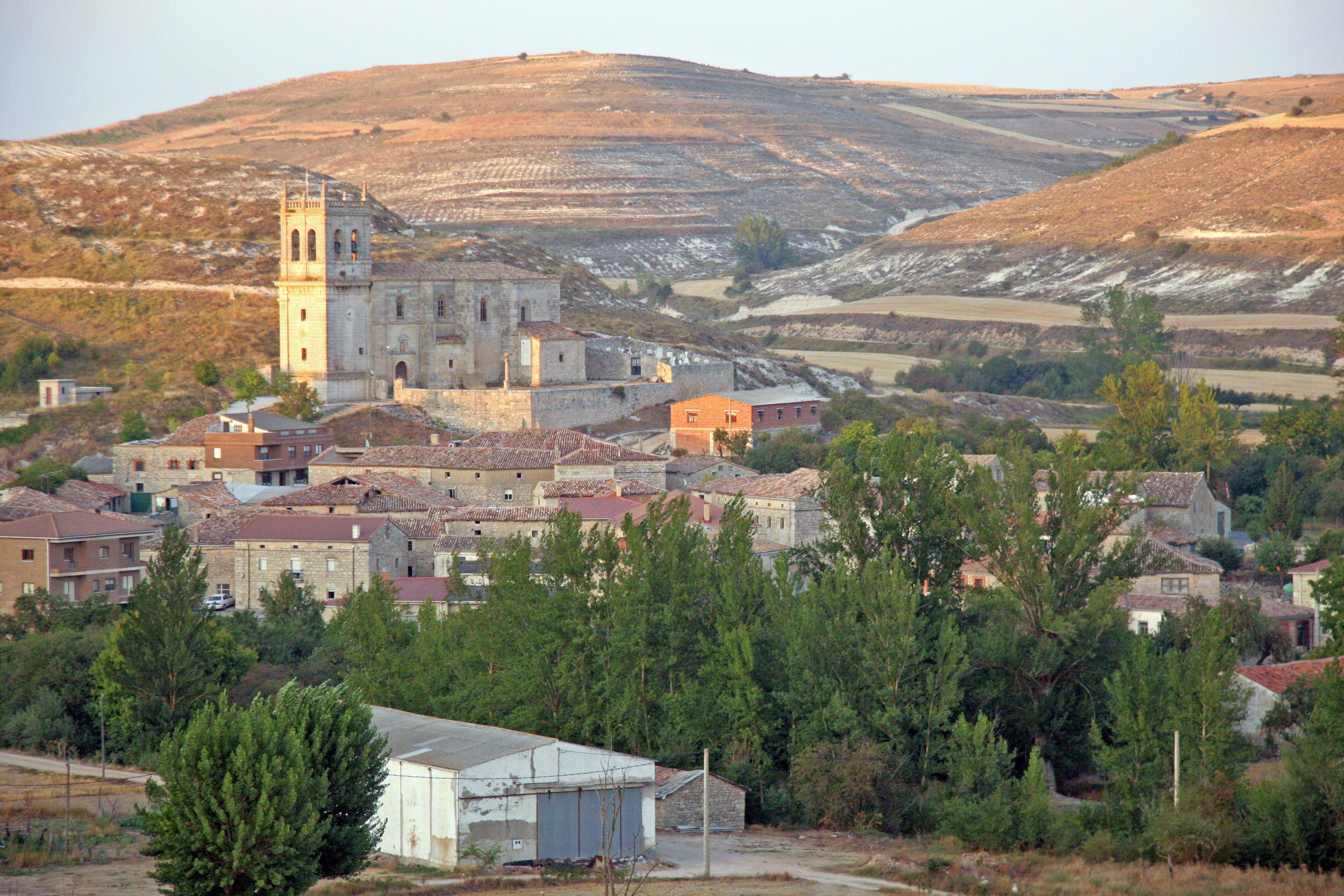
- View of Tobar, 2006

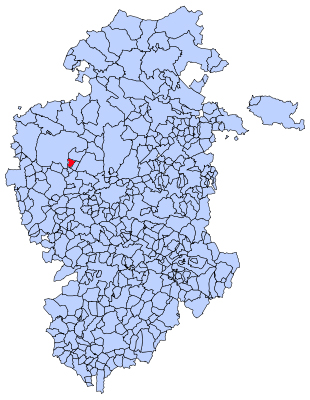
- Municipal location of Tobar in Burgos province
- Country: Spain
- Autonomous community: Castile and León
- Province: Burgos
- Comarca: Odra-Pisuerga

Area
  - Total: 12 km^{2} (4.6 sq mi)
- Elevation: 892 m (2,927 ft)

Population (2025-01-01)
  - Total: 27
  - Density: 2.2/km^{2} (5.8/sq mi)
- Time zone: UTC+1 (CET)
  - Summer (DST): UTC+2 (CEST)
- Postal code: 09133
- Website: http://www.tobar.es/

Tobar (originally Tovar) is a municipality and town located in the province of Burgos, Spain, within the Castile and León region. It is 35 km northwest of Burgos.

== General details ==
Tobar is located in a valley, surrounded of small hills, the Hormazuela river crosses the village from north to south.

The economy is based on agricultural farmers, mainly cultivating cereals, wheat and barley. The soil has much lime, but is fertile, providing good harvests most years.

Tobar has a continental climate, very cold in winter and very hot in summer. The minimum temperature in winter can descend to -10 °C; in summer the temperature can rise to 35 or 40 °C, but summer evenings are cool, even falling to 10 °C.

== Gallery ==
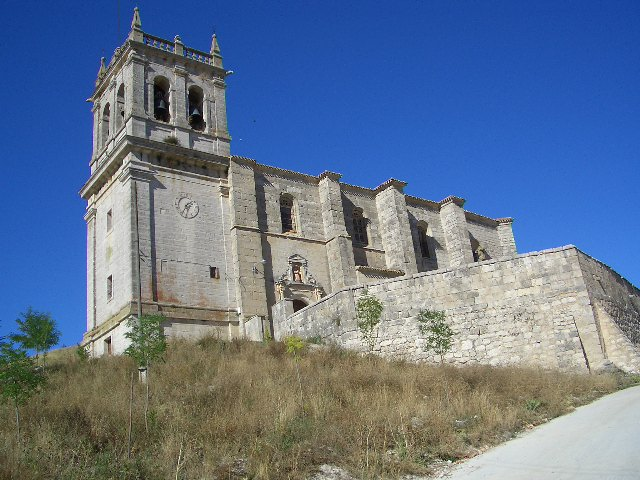
Saint Mary church

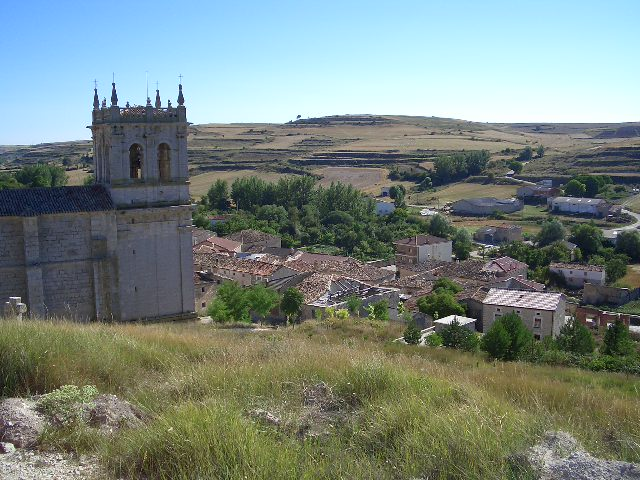
View

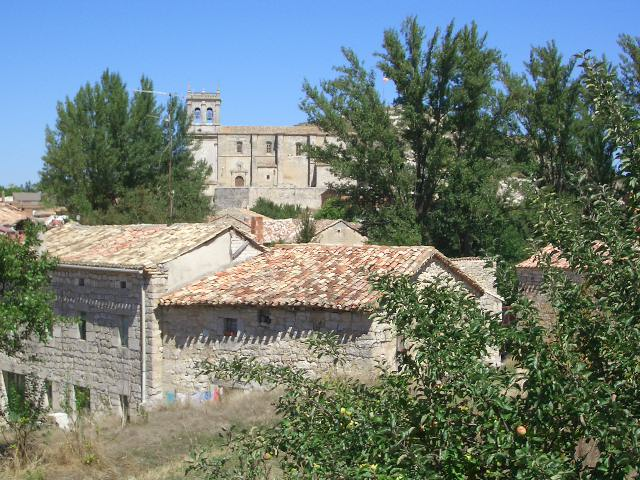
View

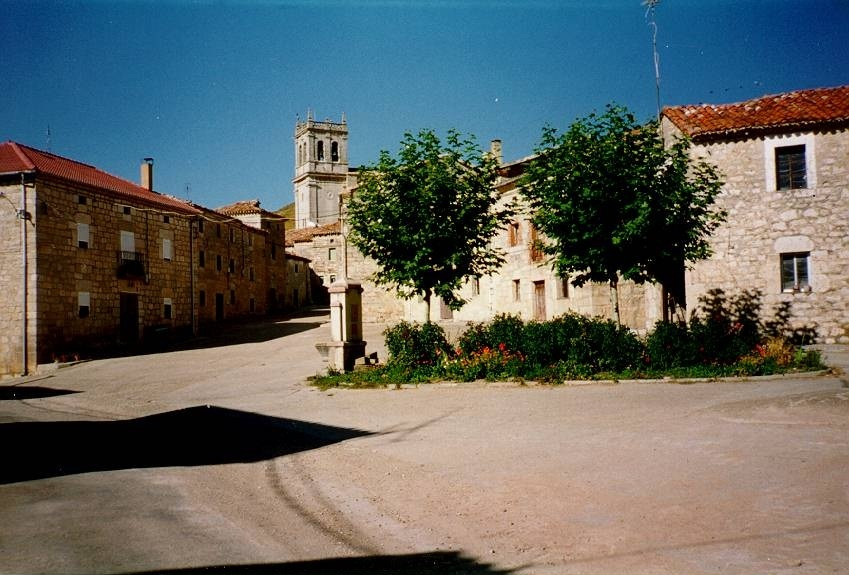
Main square
