= Ramírez Codex =

Manuscript on Aztec history from the late XVIth century

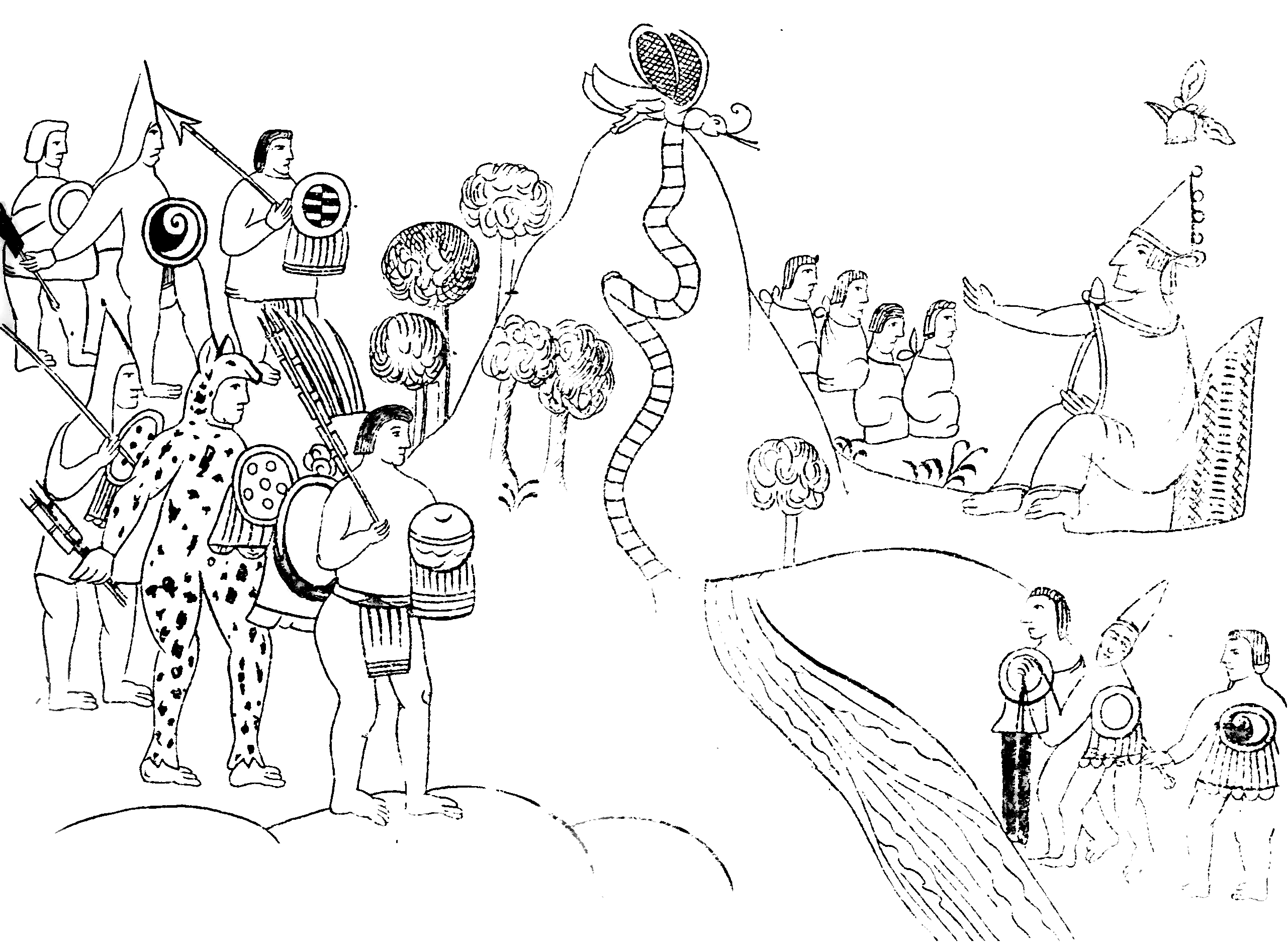
The Aztec are sieged in Chapultepec by the Tepaneca and the Culhua by the orders of Coxcoxtli, king of Culhuacan (Codex Ramírez, plate 3)

The Ramírez Codex (Biblioteca Nacional de Antropología e Historia, MNA 35-100), not to be confused with the Tovar Codex, is a post-conquest codex from the late 16th century entitled Relación del origen de los indios que hábitan esta Nueva España según sus Historias ("An Account of the Origin of the Indians who Inhabit this New Spain according to their Histories"). The manuscript is named after the Mexican scholar José Fernando Ramírez, who discovered it in 1856 in the convent of San Francisco in Mexico City.

== Creation and contents ==
The manuscript was presumably created by the jesuit Juan de Tovar c. 1583–1587 under the auspices of the historian José de Acosta. The manuscript deals with the history of the Aztec since their origins at the legendary location of Aztlan until the Spanish conquest. Besides the text of the Relación, the manuscript contains 32 line drawings which are parallel to those found in the work of Diego Durán, in which the text is probably partly inspired, although diverging in significant ways. It is considered as a draft or earlier version of what would be the Tovar Codex, a later, full color version of the same account prepared by Tovar and send to Spain to Acosta, which is now kept in the John Carter Brown Library in Providence.

The Codex Ramirez comprises three sections or treatises: An Aztec imperial history; a book about deities and their festivals; and a brief account of the native calendar. The most detailed and important section is the first treatise, which chronicles the rise of the Aztec empire and the Spanish conquest. Tovar asserts that his works were prepared with the original information of Aztec informants from Tula; however, historians argue that he also extensively utilized the works of Diego Durán, given the undeniable parallels between both. Many scholars believe that, while Tovar may have drawn from Durán, both of them, along with Tezozomoc, based their works on an earlier Nahuatl source (now lost), that is presumed to have been compiled by one or more Aztec historians sometime shortly after the conquest. This earlier document (or documents) is often referred to as "Crónica X" ("Chronicle X") and is proposed to be the original or influential source of a number of early manuscripts (such as the Ramírez, Durán and Acosta codices), based on similarities in their content, which coincide in the exaltation of the Cihuacoatl Tlacaelel as the crucial figure in the consolidation and expansion of the Aztec empire.

The illustrations that accompany the manuscript were created using traditional indigenous techniques by an Aztec book painter or tlacuiloque. They are uncoloured, and written indications for illumination are still left in some plates, as in number 26 and 28. The first eighteen drawings are parallel to those in Durán's Historia de las Indias de Nueva España e Islas de Tierra Firme; numbers 29 and 30 are calendar wheels, while the final two drawings are entirely original, depicting the Spanish Conquest.

== Discovery and publication ==
The Ramírez Codex was discovered in 1856 by José Fernando Ramírez in the library of the convent of San Francisco in Mexico City. Ramírez prepared its publication but did not live to see its first publication, which was finally done by Manuel Orozco y Berra in his 1847 edition of the work Crónica Mexicana by Fernando Alvarado Tezozomoc. To honour Ramírez, Orozco y Berra gave his name to the codex itself; in his edition, he published both the Codex and the work of Tezozomoc together along with Ramírez preface, and intercalated the plates from Codex Ramírez along the whole volume. It was only later, with the edition of Editorial Inovación in 1979, that the Codex Ramírez was published in standalone form. The work has been subsequently translated to French, and English.

== The Illustrations of the Ramírez Codex ==
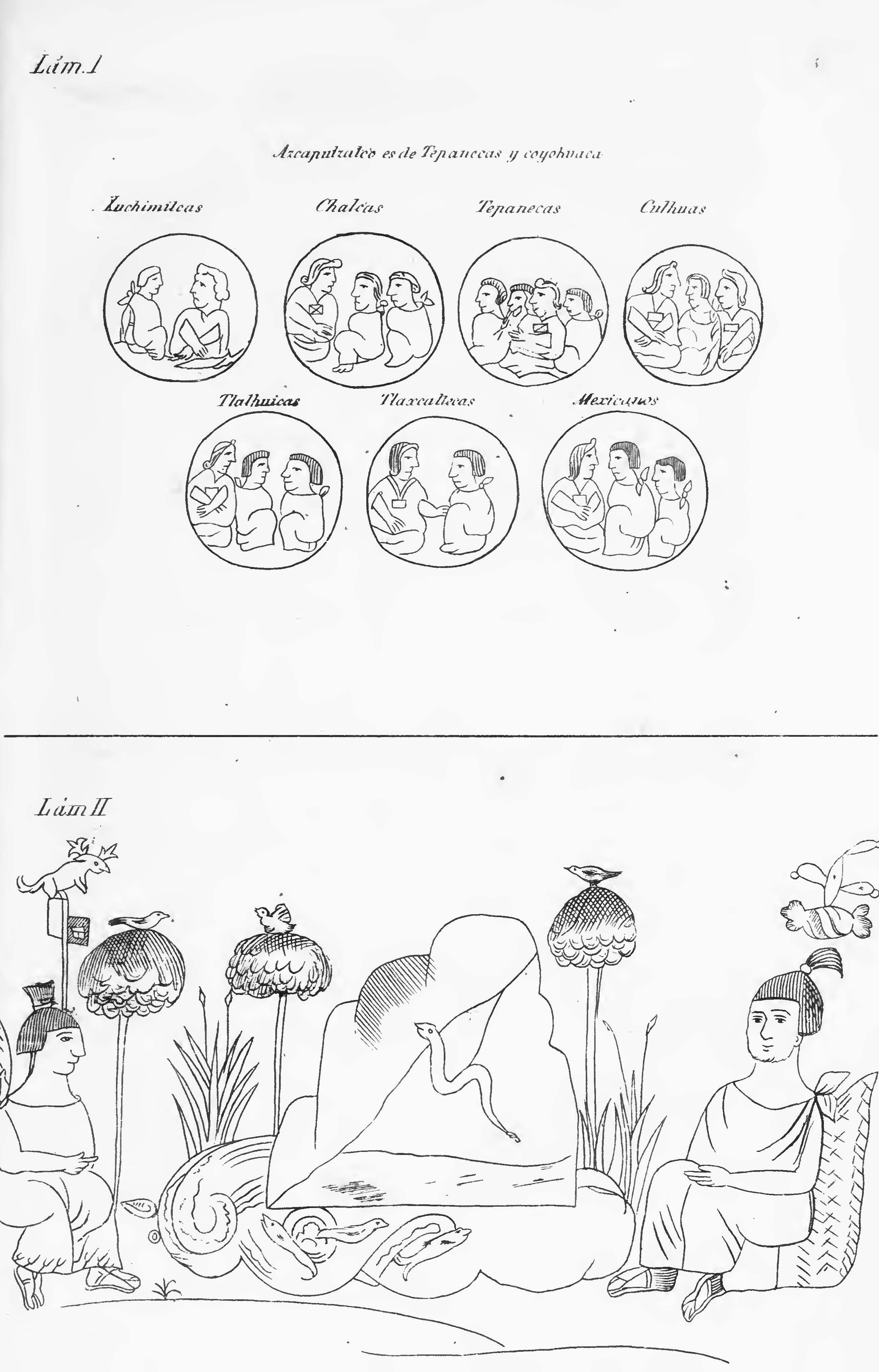
Plates 1 and 2. Chicomoztoc and Tollan

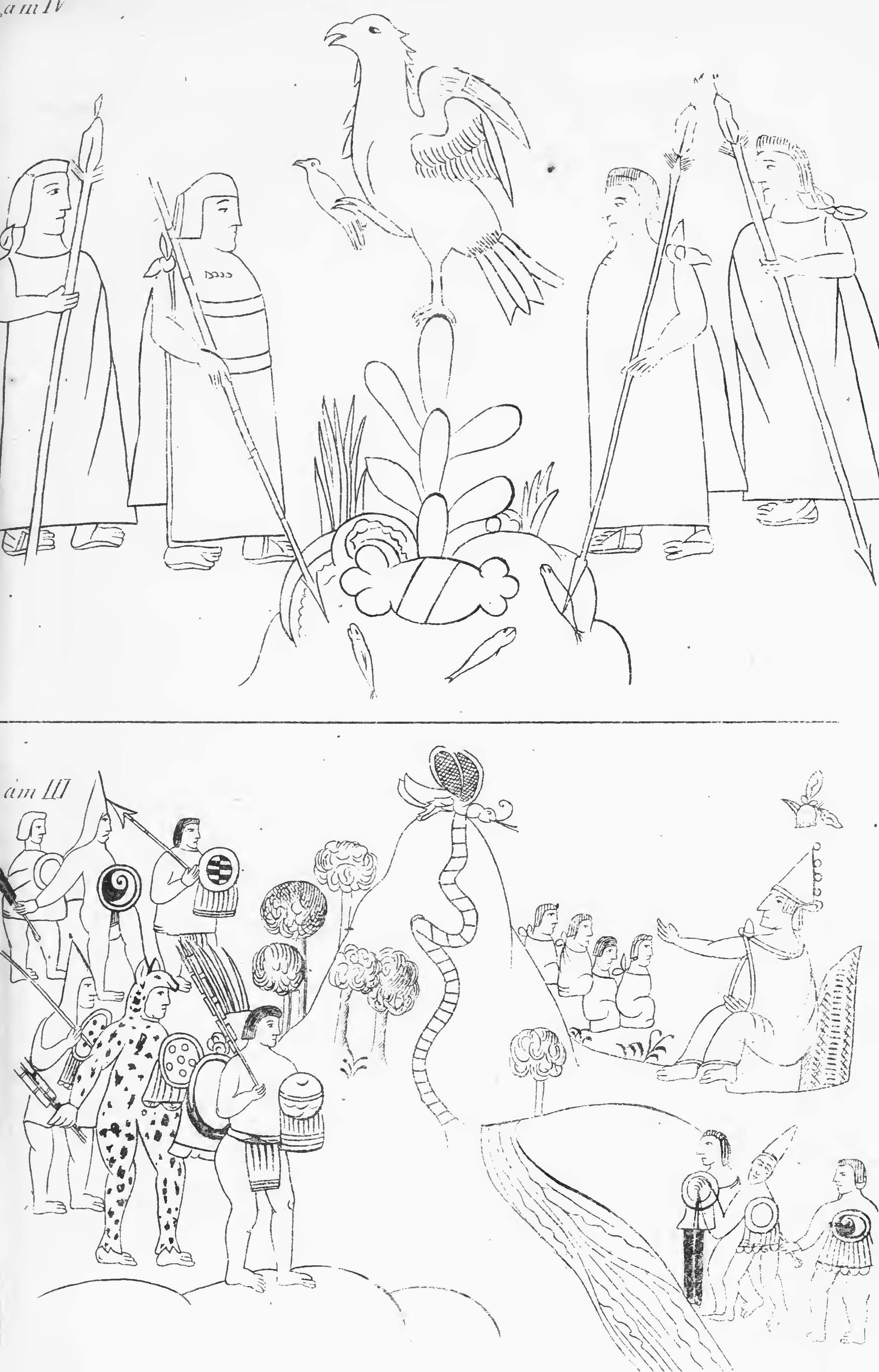
Plates 3 and 4. The founding of Tenochtitlan and Battle at Chapultepec

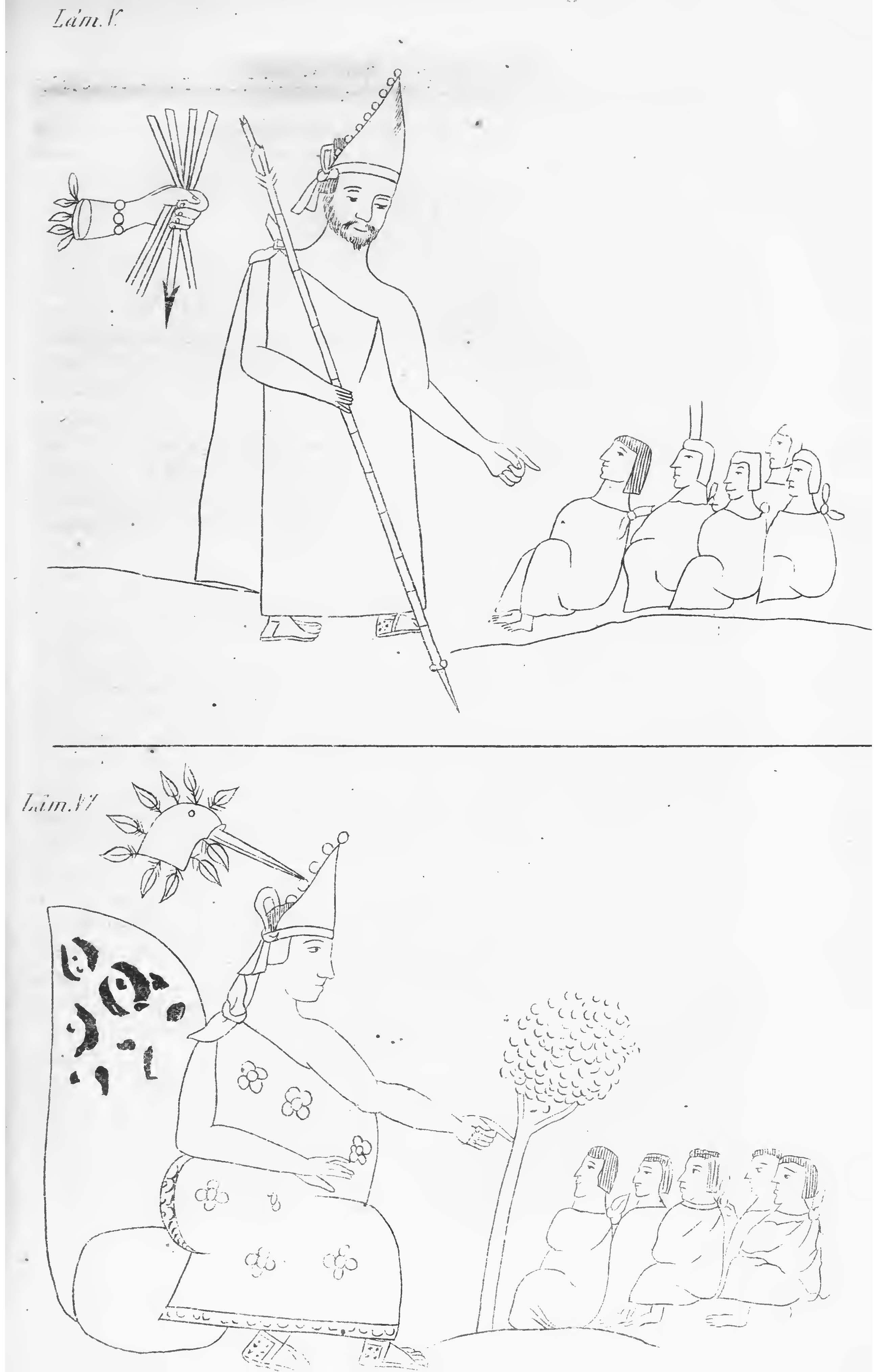
Plates 5 and 6. Acamapichtli and Huitzilihuitl

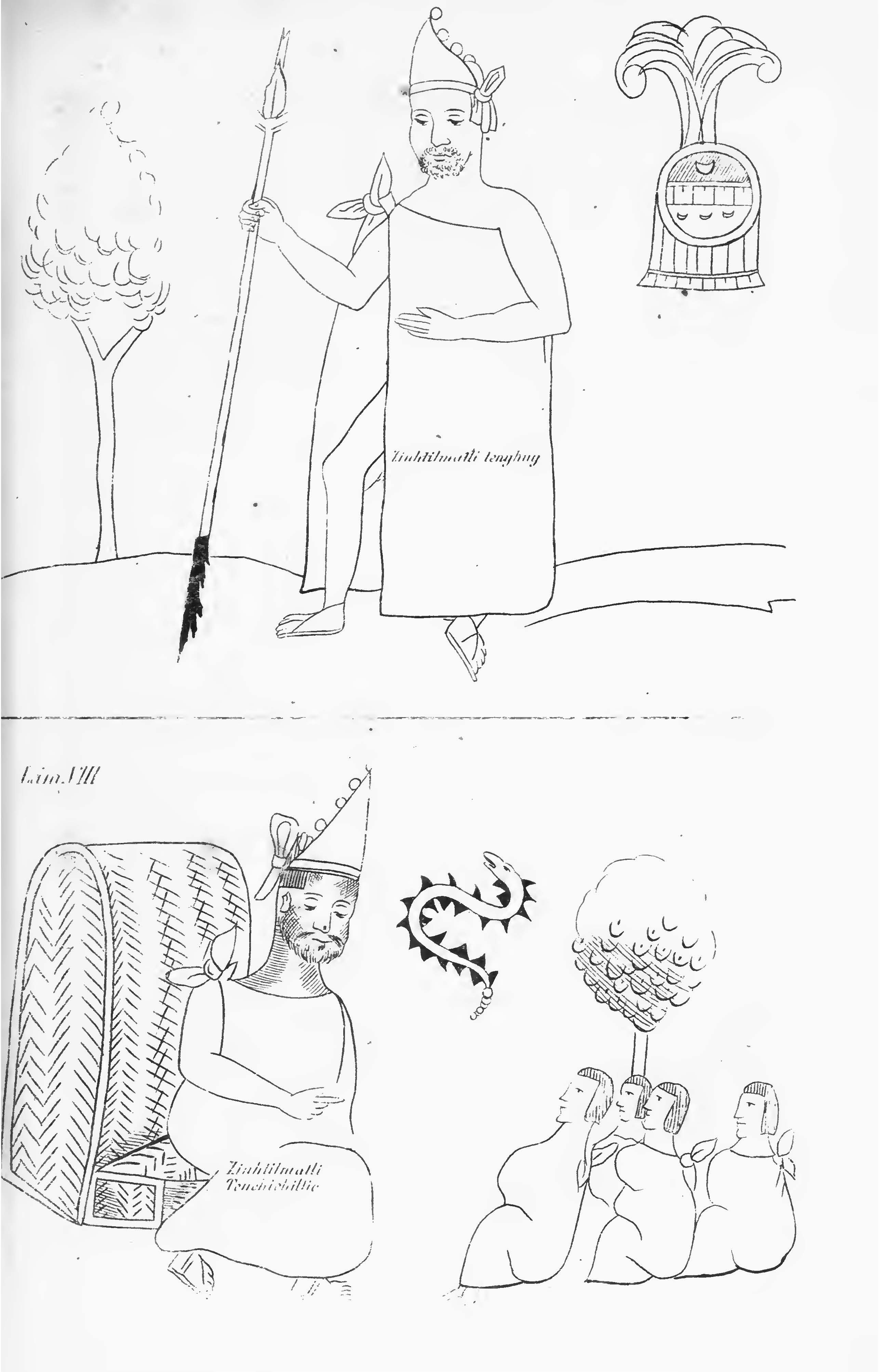
Plates 7 and 8. Chimalpopoca and Itzcoatl

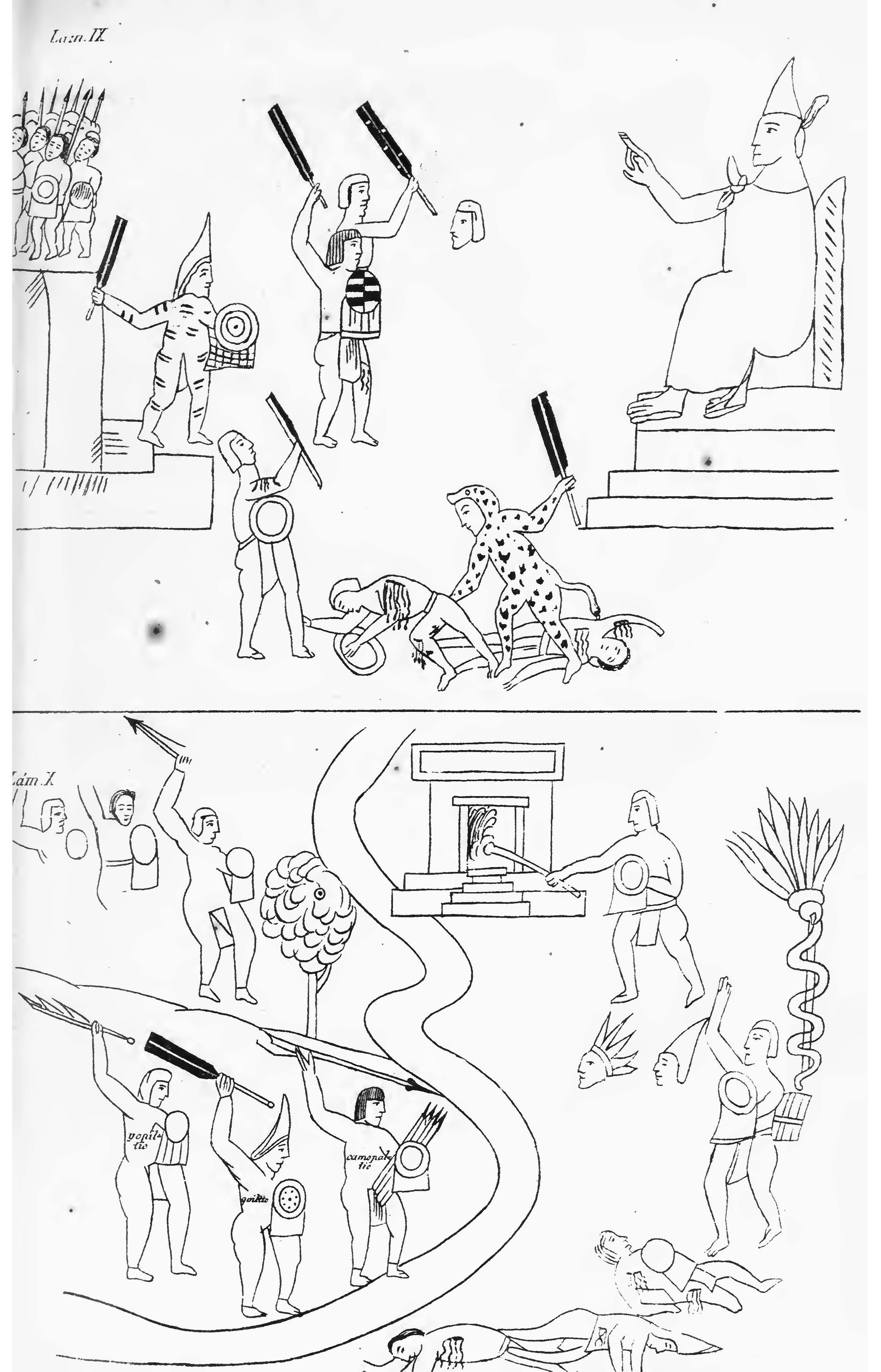
Plates 9 and 10. Battles at Azcapotzalco and Coyoacan

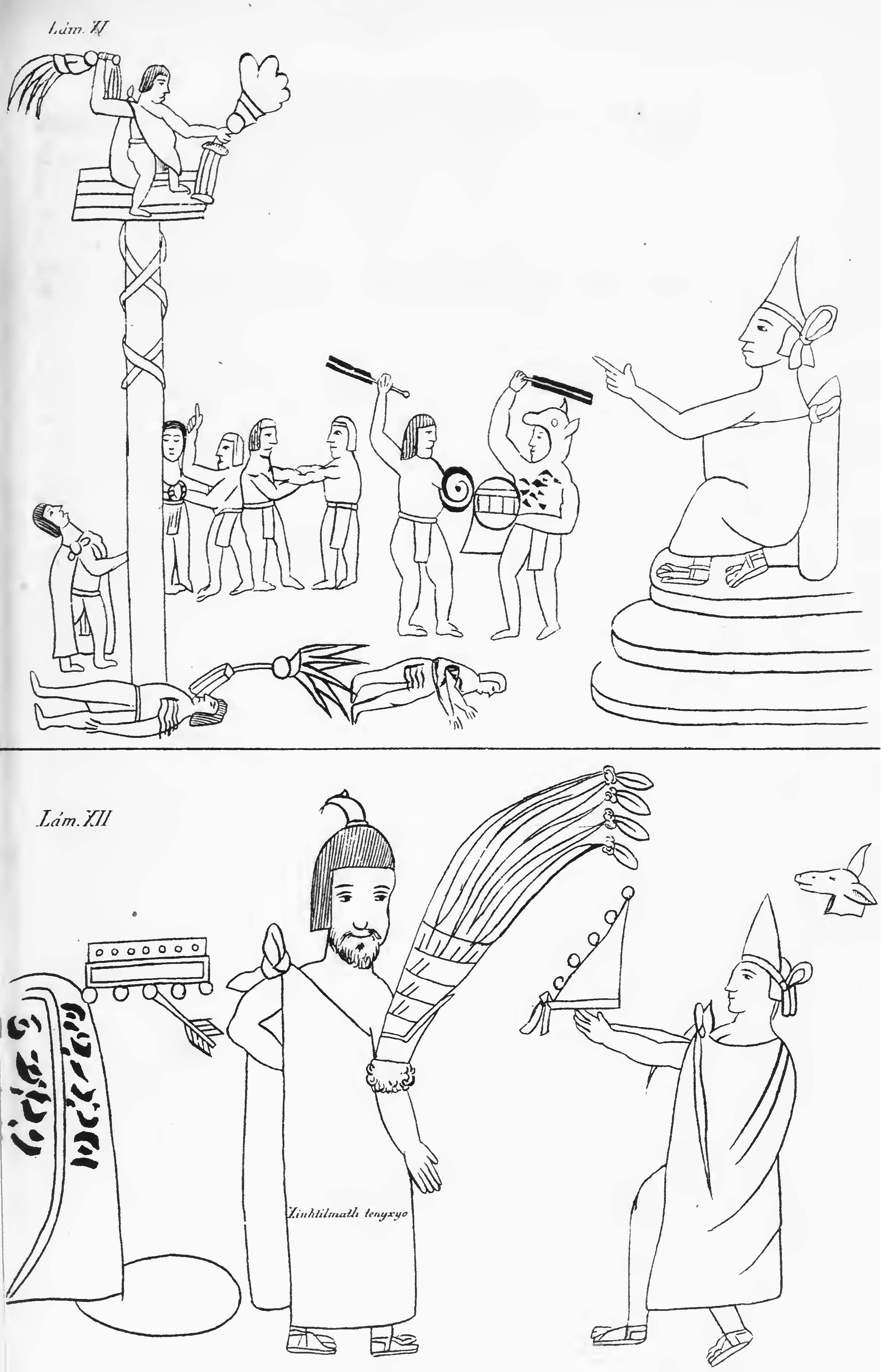
Plates 11 and 12. Sacrifice of a warrior. Moctezuma Ilhuicamina.

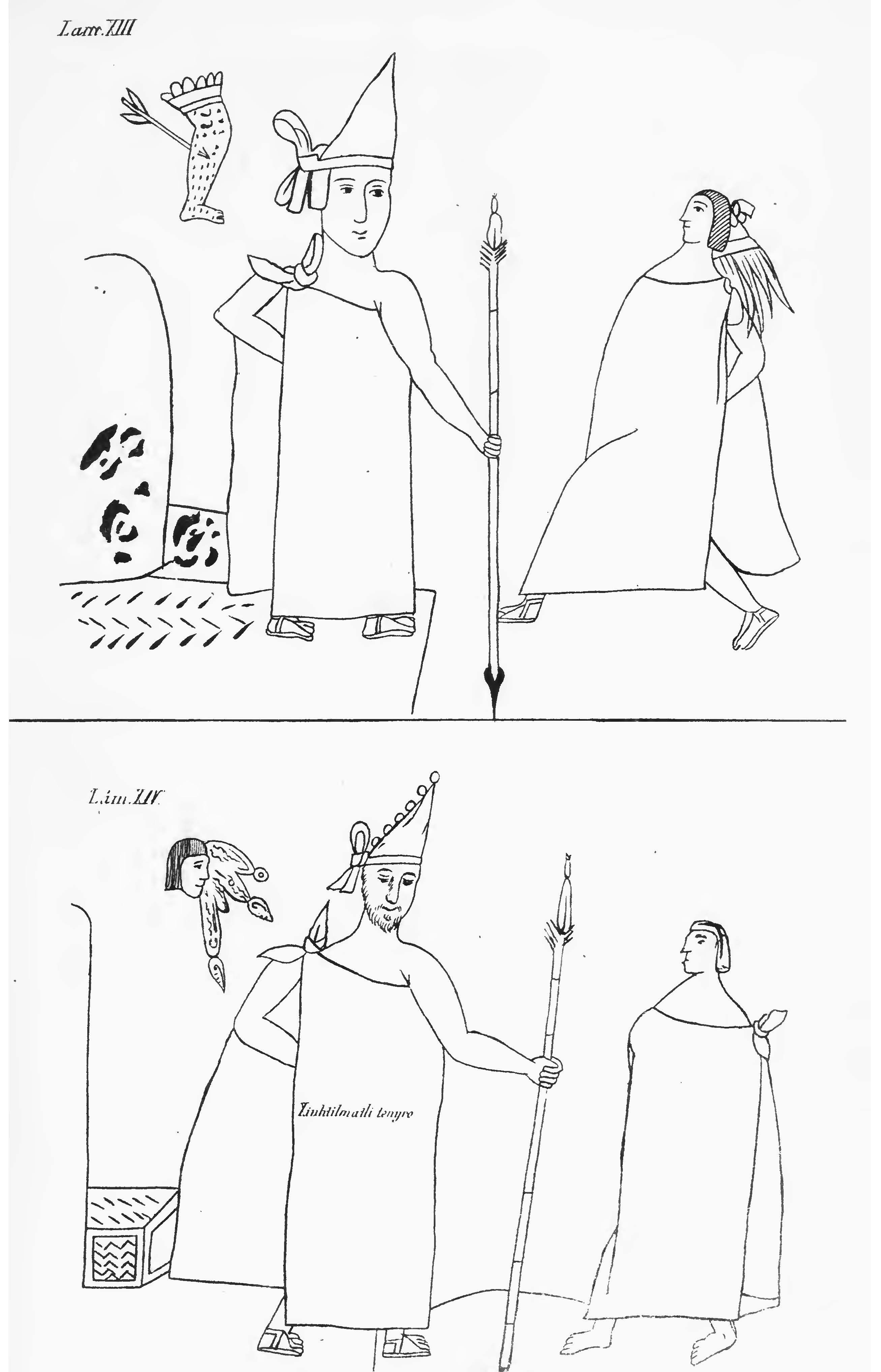
Plates 13 and 14: Tizoc and Axayacatl

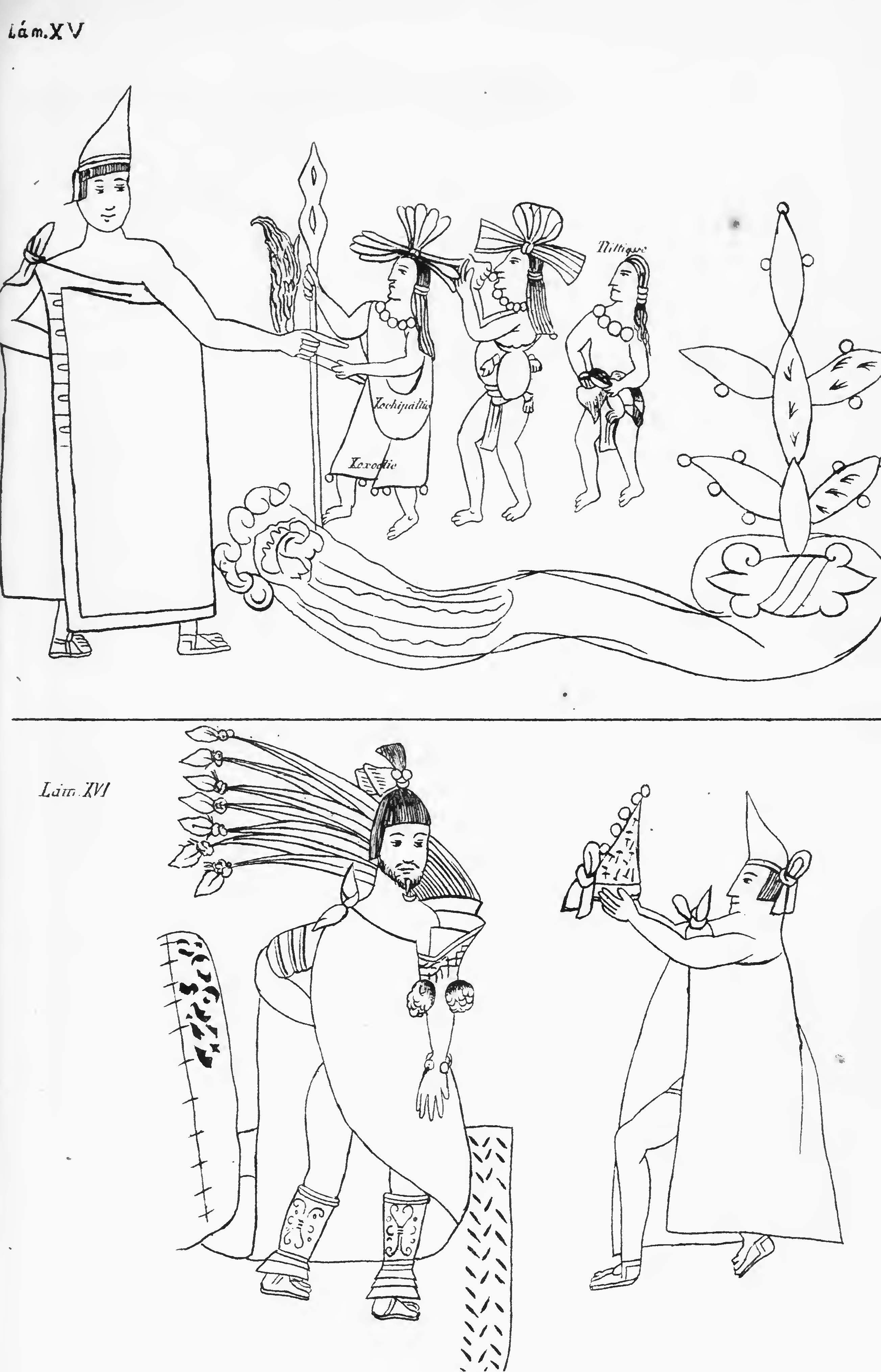
Plates 15 and 16. The sorcerers receive the water of Cuextecatl, Moctezuma Xocoyotzin.

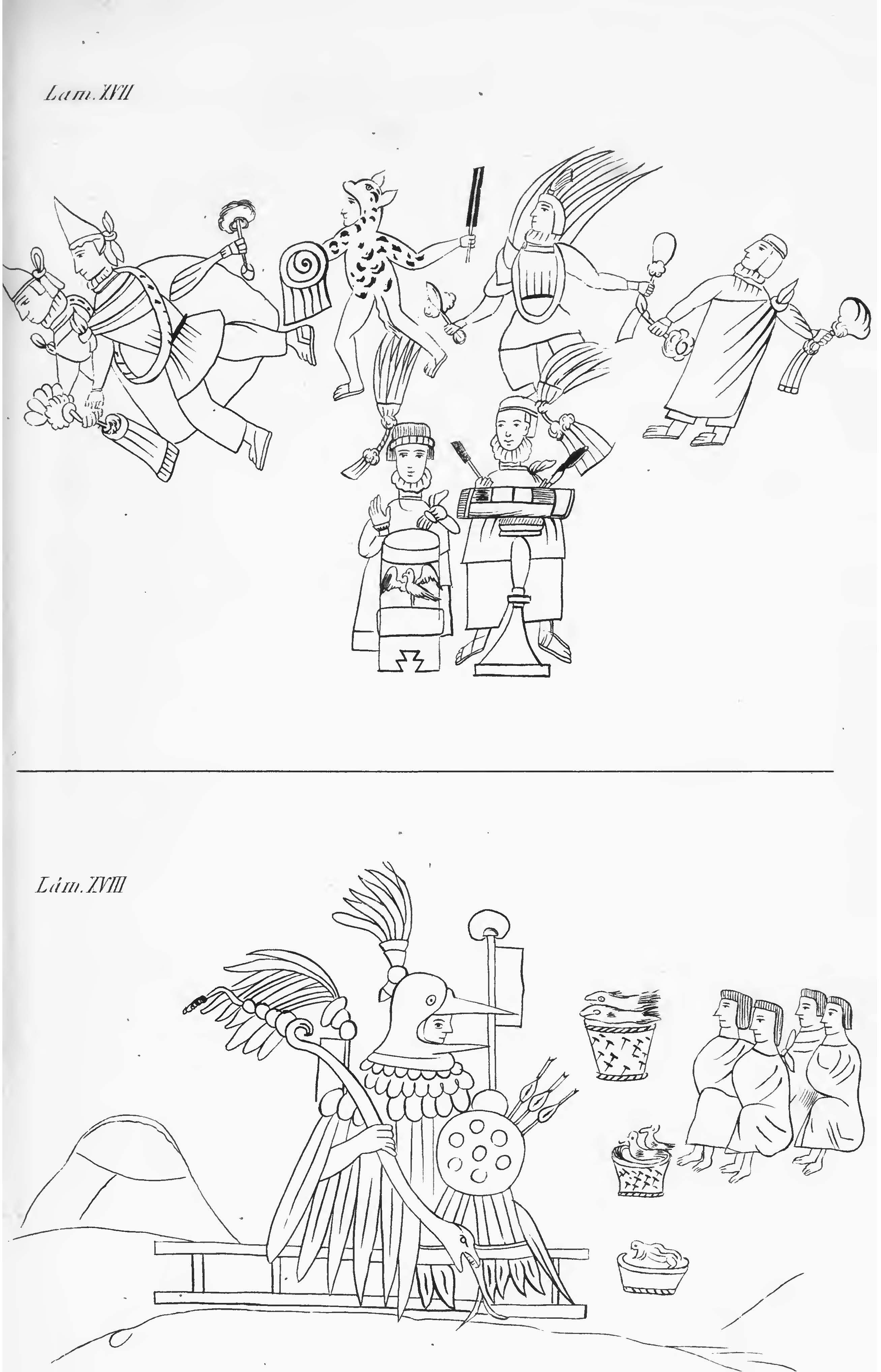
Plates 17 and 18. Dancing. Huitzilopochtli

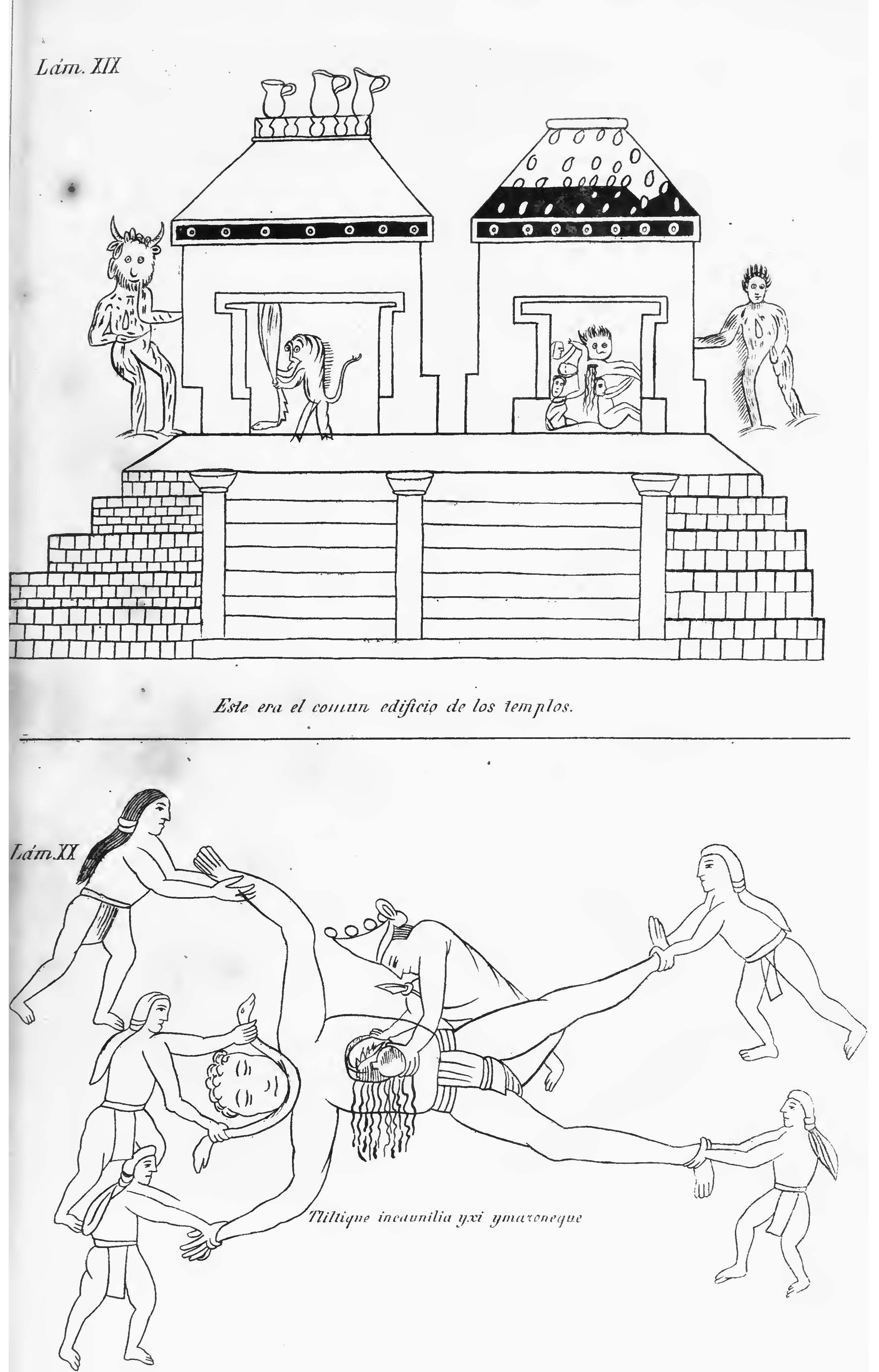
Plates 19 and 20. Aztec temples, human sacrifices

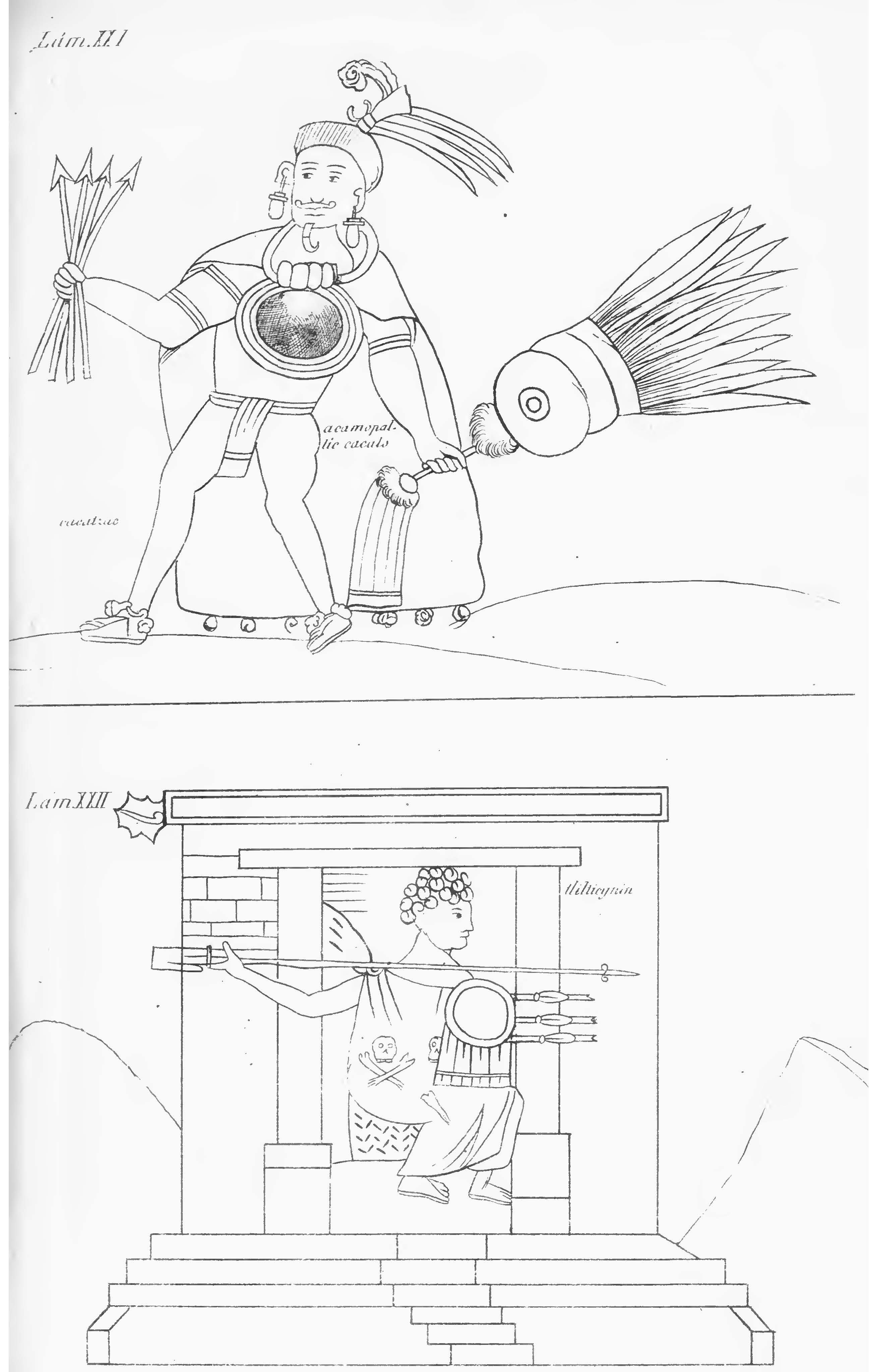
Plates 20 and 21. Aztec gods.

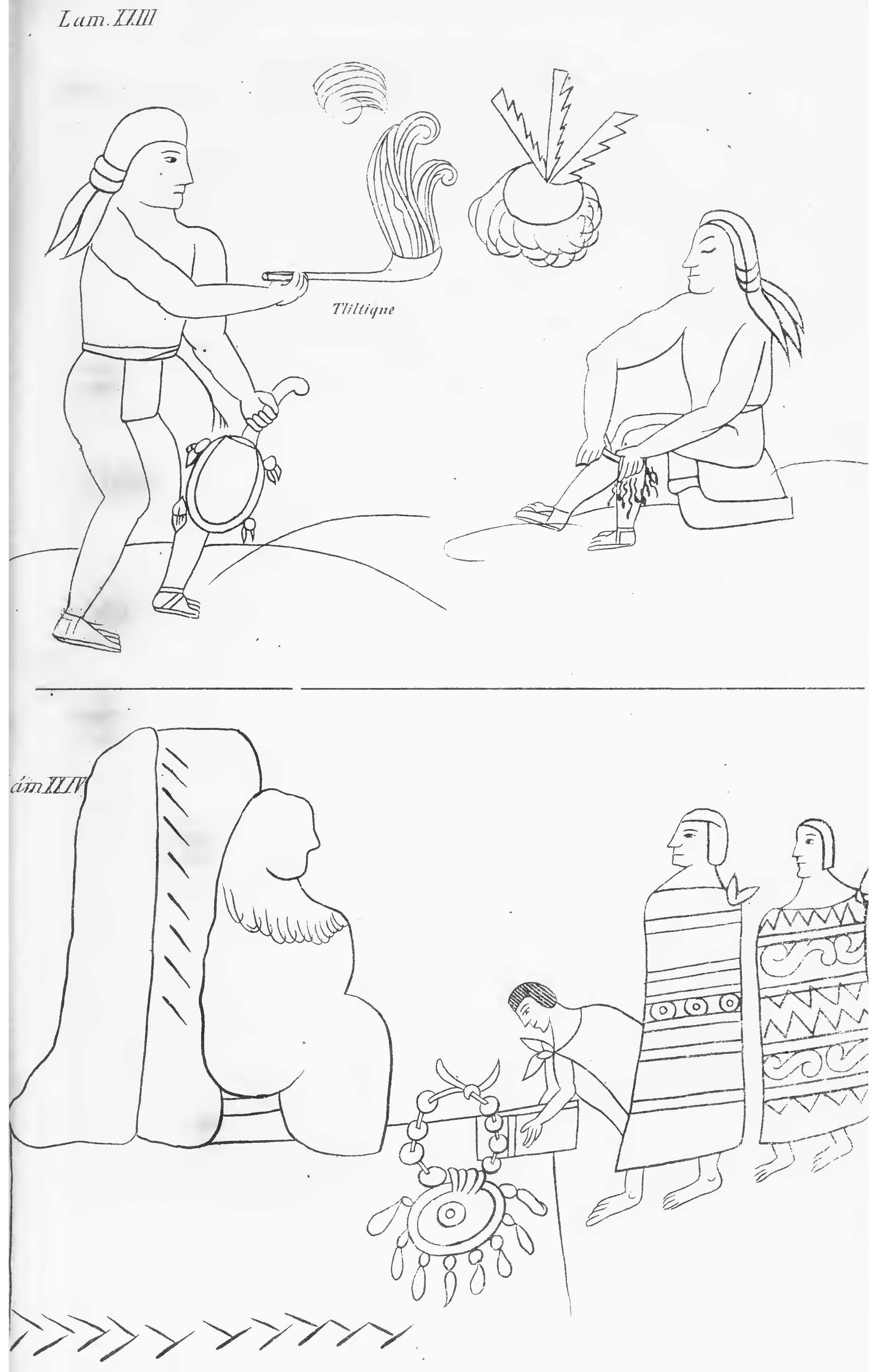
Plates 22 and 23. Priests and funerals.

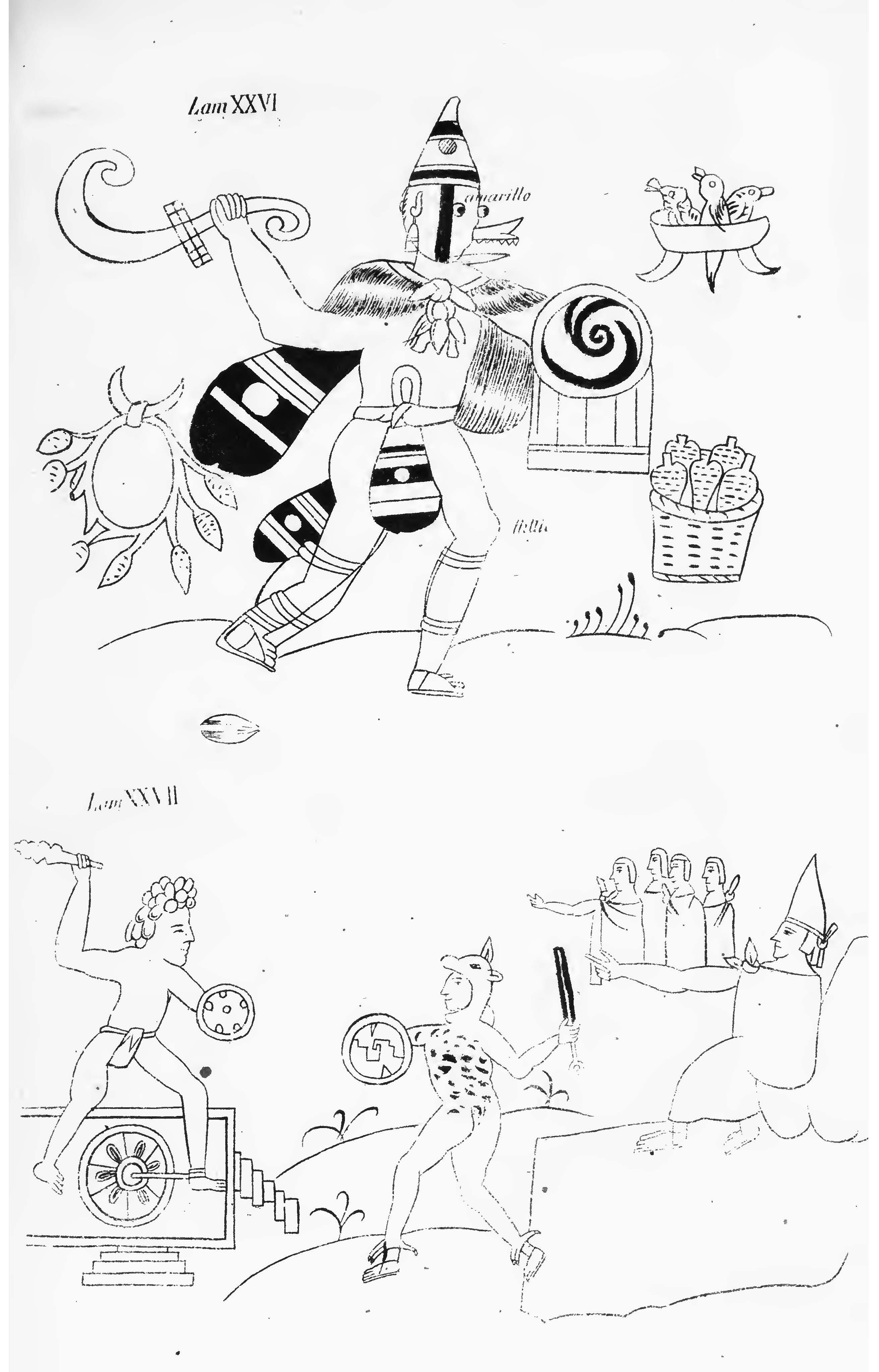
Plates 25 and 26. Quetzalcoatl. The feast of Tlacaxipehualiztli

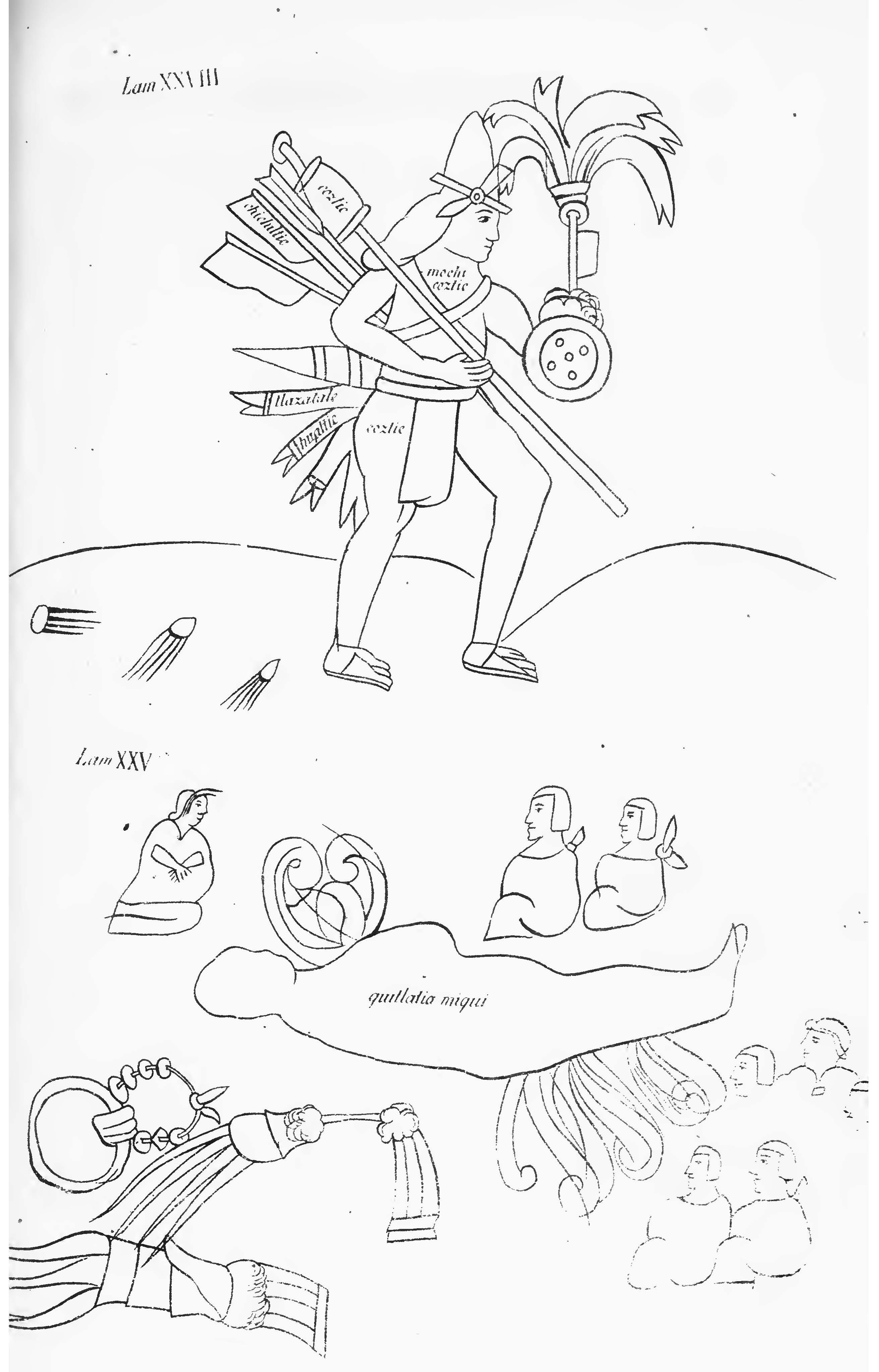
Plates 27 and 28. Xipe Totec. Funeral

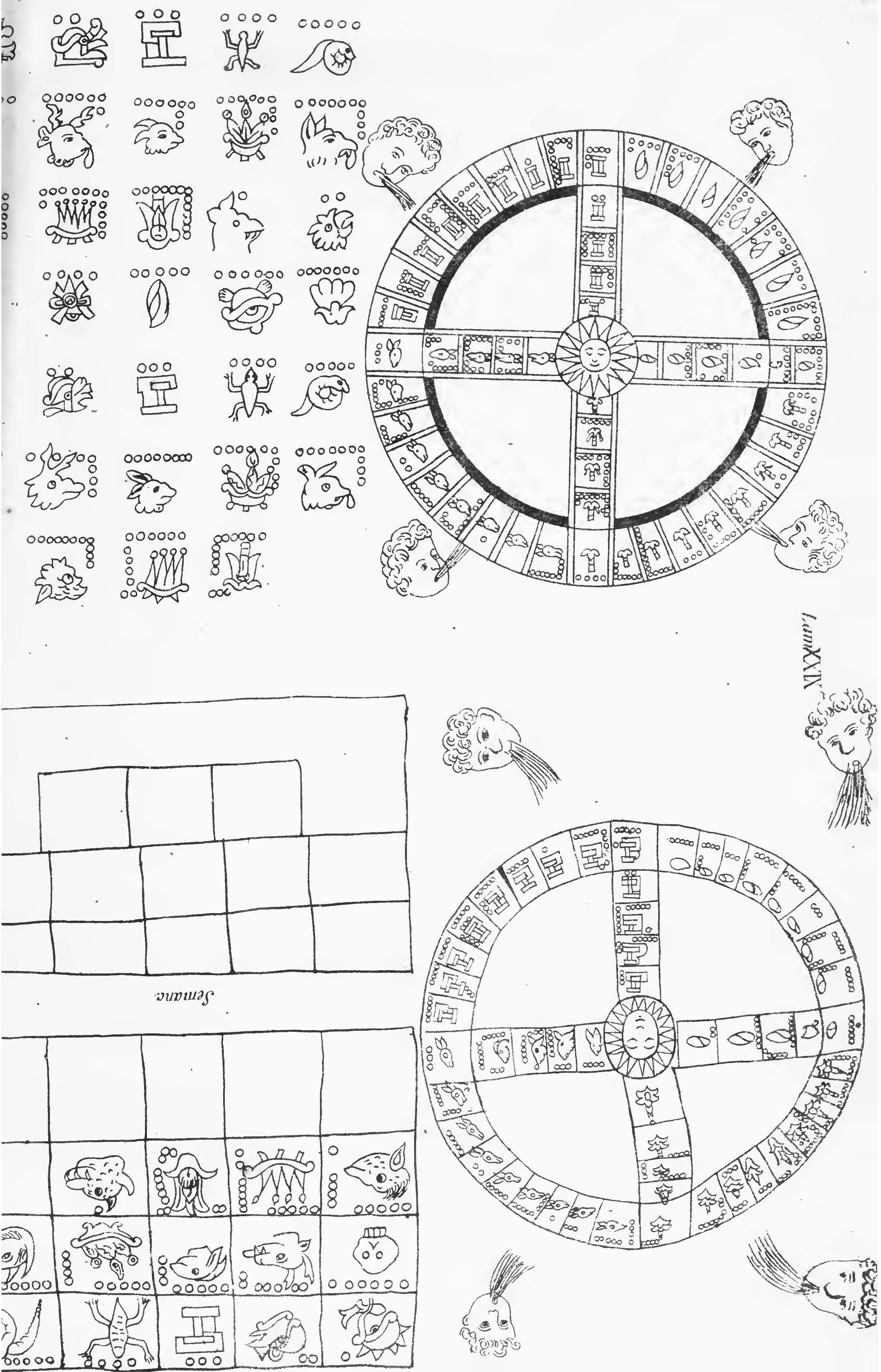
Plates 29 and 30. Calendric Wheels

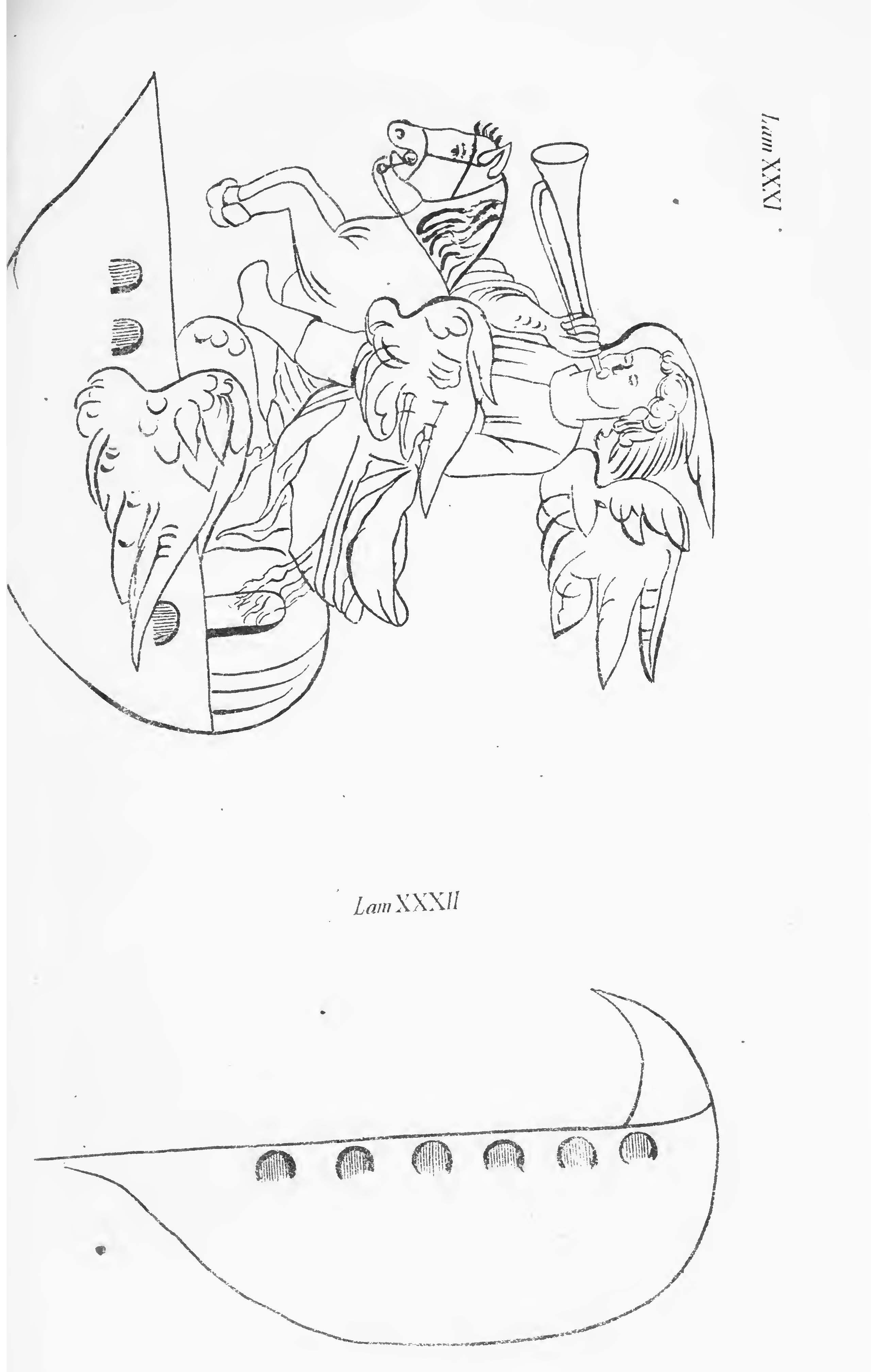
Plates 31 and 32. The Spanish Conquest

== See also ==
- Mesoamerican codices
- Aztec codices
- Diego Durán
- List of chronicles of the Indies – including similar manuscripts
