= Crónica X =

"Crónica X" (Spanish pronunciation: [ˈkɾonika ˈekis]) is the name given by Mesoamerican researchers to a postulated primary-source early 16th century historical work on the traditional history of the Aztec and other central Mexican peoples, which some researchers theorize formed the basis for several other extant 16th century documents. The chronicle's author is unknown and the work has been lost, if indeed it ever existed, but it is thought to have been used as a source for several other chronicles that contain striking similarities, among these the Chronicles of Fray Diego Durán, Juan de Tovar and José de Acosta. It has been suggested that it is to be identified with a book which is known to have been written by Andrés de Olmos but which has not survived.

The similarities among the materials and scope of documents such as the Durán, Tovar and Acosta codices were first noted by Robert Barlow in 1945, which led him to postulate that they all must have had a particular source in common, which he denoted as Crónica X.

== See also ==
- Crónicas de Indias – on similar, extant chronicles
