= Tula =

Tula may refer to:

== Geography ==
=== Antarctica ===
- Tula Mountains
- Tula Point

=== Iran ===
- Tula, Iran, a village in Hormozgan Province

=== Italy ===
- Tula, Sardinia, municipality (comune) in the province of Sassari, Italy

=== Kenya ===
- Garba Tula, town in Northern Kenya
- Garba Tula Airport

=== Mexico ===
- Atotonilco de Tula, city and municipality of Hidalgo
- Roman Catholic Diocese of Tula
- Tula (Mesoamerican site), the Toltec capital
- Tula de Allende, the modern city in Hidalgo state
- Tula, Tamaulipas, town in the state of Tamaulipas
- Tula Municipality, municipality of Tamaulipas
- Tula River, in central Mexico
- Unión de Tula, municipality in Jalisco in central-western Mexico

=== Mongolia ===
- Tula, also Tola, variant transcriptions of Tuul River

=== Russia ===
- Tula Oblast, a federal subject of Russia
- Tula, Russia, a city and the administrative center of Tula Oblast
  - Klokovo (air base), a Russian Air Force airbase near the above city
  - Tula Arsenal, a Russian weapons manufacturer
  - Tula railway station, a railway station in Tula
- Tula Governorate, administrative division of the Russian Empire (1796–1929)
- Tula electoral district (Russian Constituent Assembly election, 1917)

=== United States ===
- Tula, Mississippi, unincorporated place in Lafayette County
- Tula, American Samoa, a village in eastern Tutuila

== People ==
- Tula people, Native American tribe
- Tula language, Savanna language of eastern Nigeria

=== First names ===
- Tula (Curaçao) (fl. 1795), leader of the Curaçao slave revolt
- Rao Tula Ram (1825–1863), Indian rebellion leader
- Tula Benites, Peruvian politician
- Tula Giannini, American academic and musicologist
- Tula Lotay, pen name of English comic book writer Lisa Wood
- Tula Rodríguez, Peruvian dancer, actress and model
- Tulisa (born 1988), full name Tula Paulinea Contostavlos, English singer/songwriter, actress, and TV personality

=== Surnames ===
- Cristian Tula (born 1978), Argentine football player
- Turab Tula (1918–1990), Soviet Uzbek writer

=== Stagenames ===
- Caroline Cossey a.k.a. "Tula" (born 1954), an English model, transgender woman, and documentary producer
- Tula (1903–1992), Native American dancer, birth name Gertrude Prokosch Kurath

== Other uses ==
- "Tula", track from the 1994 Cusco album Apurimac II
- Tula massacre, 1981 incident in the Mexican state of Hidalgo
- 8985 Tula, main-belt asteroid
- Russian submarine K-114 Tula, Russian nuclear-powered ballistic missile submarine
- Tula: The Revolt, a 2013 historical drama film of the slave revolt led by Tula
- Tula Arms Plant, a Russian weapons manufacturer
- Tula (brig), ship of the English mariner and explorer John Biscoe (1794–1843)
- Tula pryanik, type of Russian gingerbread
- Tula, pink Hoob on the popular children's TV show
- Tula, the real name of superheroine Aquagirl from DC Comics
- Tula Springs, fictional town in a series of novels by the James Wilcox
- Tula prison break, a 2021 prison escape in Tula de Allende, Hidalgo, Mexico
- Tula, synonym of the genus Nolana in the family Solanaceae
- Tula, Chilean Spanish slang for "penis"
- Tula, a month in the Darian calendar
- Tulā, a solar month in the traditional Indian calendar

== See also ==
- TUL (disambiguation)
- Tola (disambiguation)
- Tulsky (disambiguation)
- Toula (disambiguation)
- Thule
