= Monarchism in German-speaking countries =

The Monarchy of Germany was abolished after the abdication of Kaiser Wilhelm in 1918, during the Revolution of 1918-1919 and the proclamation and transition of the German Reich into a Republican form of government, i.e The establishment of the Weimar Republic and the abdication of the Kings in Germany. Today the only monarchist organizations working at the federal level are Tradition und Leben, as well as regional groups in Bavaria and Saxony, among others, supporters of the former ruling families such as the Wittelsbach and Wettin families. Today, most associations do not argue for the return of the former systems, but instead push for a parliamentary system more similar to those found in other European Kingdoms. Today the only German speaking countries that are still monarchies are Belgium, Liechtenstein and Luxembourg.

== Monarchist Groups ==
=== Current ===
- Black-Yellow Alliance
- Free Saxony

=== Defunct ===
- Christian Social Party
- German Conservative Party
- German Fatherland Party
- German National Peoples Party
- German People's party
- German Right Party
- German Party
- League for Bavaria and Empire
- Tradition und Leben

== See also ==
- Monarchism in Bavaria after 1918
