= TUL =

Tul is a Korean martial art form.

Tul or TUL may also refer to:

== Places ==
- Tul, Hormozgan, Iran
- Tuł, Masovian Voivodeship, Poland

== Institutions ==
- TUL corporation, a Taiwanese computer products manufacturer
- Technical University of Liberec, Czech Republic
- Łódź University of Technology (former name: Technical University of Lodz)
- Tradition und Leben, a German monarchist organisation
- Transnational University Limburg
- Tulsa International Airport, Oklahoma, United States
- Finnish Workers' Sports Federation (Finnish: Työväen Urheiluliitto), a Finnish amateur sports organisation

== People ==
- Tullus (praenomen), a Roman praenomen
- Magdalena Tul (born 1980), Polish singer and composer
- Erik Tul (born 1975), Slovenian rower
- Tul., taxonomic author abbreviation for Edmond Tulasne (1815–1885), French botanist and mycologist

== Other ==
- Truck Utility Light, the British Army designation of the Land Rover Wolf 90

== See also ==
- Tull (disambiguation)
- Tula (disambiguation)
