= Monarchies in Europe =

Map of Europe showing current monarchies (red) and republics (blue)

In European history, monarchy was the prevalent form of government throughout the Middle Ages, only occasionally competing with communalism, notably in the case of the maritime republics, the Swiss Confederacy and San Marino.

In the early modern period (1500–1800 CE), republicanism became more prevalent, but monarchy still remained predominant in Europe until the end of the 19th century. After World War I, however, most European monarchies were abolished. There remain, as of 2026, twelve sovereign monarchies in Europe. Seven are kingdoms: Denmark, Norway, Sweden, the United Kingdom, Spain, the Netherlands, and Belgium. Three are principalities: Andorra, Liechtenstein, and Monaco. Finally, Luxembourg is a grand duchy and Vatican City is a theocratic, elective monarchy ruled by the pope.

The monarchies can be divided into two broad classes: premodern states and those that gained their independence during or immediately after the Napoleonic Wars. Denmark, Norway, Sweden, the United Kingdom, Spain, Andorra, and Monaco are the successors to premodern monarchies. Liechtenstein, the Netherlands, Belgium, and Luxembourg were established or gained independence through various methods during the Napoleonic Wars. The State of the Vatican City was recognized as a sovereign state administered by the Holy See in 1929.

Ten of these monarchies are hereditary, and two are elective: Vatican City (the pope, elected at the papal conclave), and Andorra (technically a semi-elective diarchy, the joint heads of state being the elected president of France and the bishop of Urgell, appointed by the pope).

Most of the monarchies in Europe are constitutional monarchies, which means that the monarch does not influence the politics of the state: either the monarch is legally prohibited from doing so, or the monarch does not utilize the political powers vested in the office by convention. The exceptions are Liechtenstein and Monaco, which are usually considered semi-constitutional monarchies due to the large influence the princes still have on politics, and Vatican City, which is an absolute monarchy. There is currently no major campaign to abolish the monarchy (see monarchism and republicanism) in any of the twelve states, although there is at least a small minority of republicans in many of them (e.g. the political organisation Republic in the United Kingdom). Currently six of the twelve monarchies are members of the European Union: Belgium, Denmark, Luxembourg, the Netherlands, Spain and Sweden.

At the start of the 20th century, France, Switzerland and San Marino were the only European nations to have a republican form of government. The ascent of republicanism to the political mainstream started only at the beginning of the 20th century, facilitated by the toppling of various European monarchies after the end of World War I; as at the beginning of the 21st century, most of the states in Europe are republics with either a directly or indirectly elected head of state.

== History ==
=== Origins ===
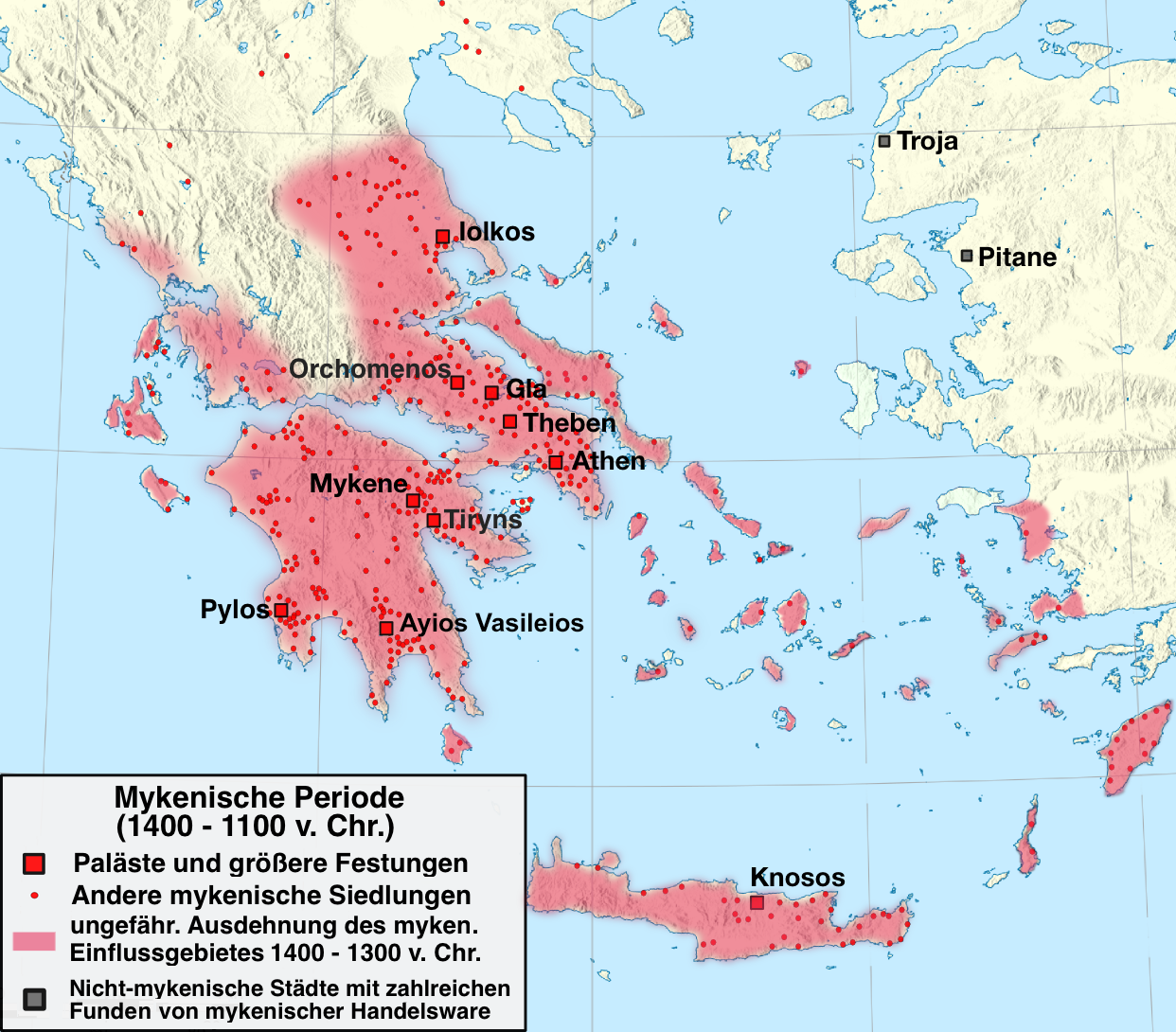
Map of Mycenaean Greece

The notion of kingship in Europe ultimately originates in systems of tribal kingship in prehistoric Europe. The Minoan (c. 3200 – c. 1400 BCE) and Mycenaean civilisation (c. 1600 – c. 1100 BCE) provide the earliest examples of monarchies in protohistoric Greece. Thanks to the decipherment of the Linear B script in 1952, much knowledge has been acquired about society in the Mycenaean realms, where the kings functioned as leaders of palace economies. The role of kings changed in the following Greek Dark Ages (c. 1100 – c. 750 BCE) to big gentleman farmers with military power.

=== Archaic and classical antiquity ===
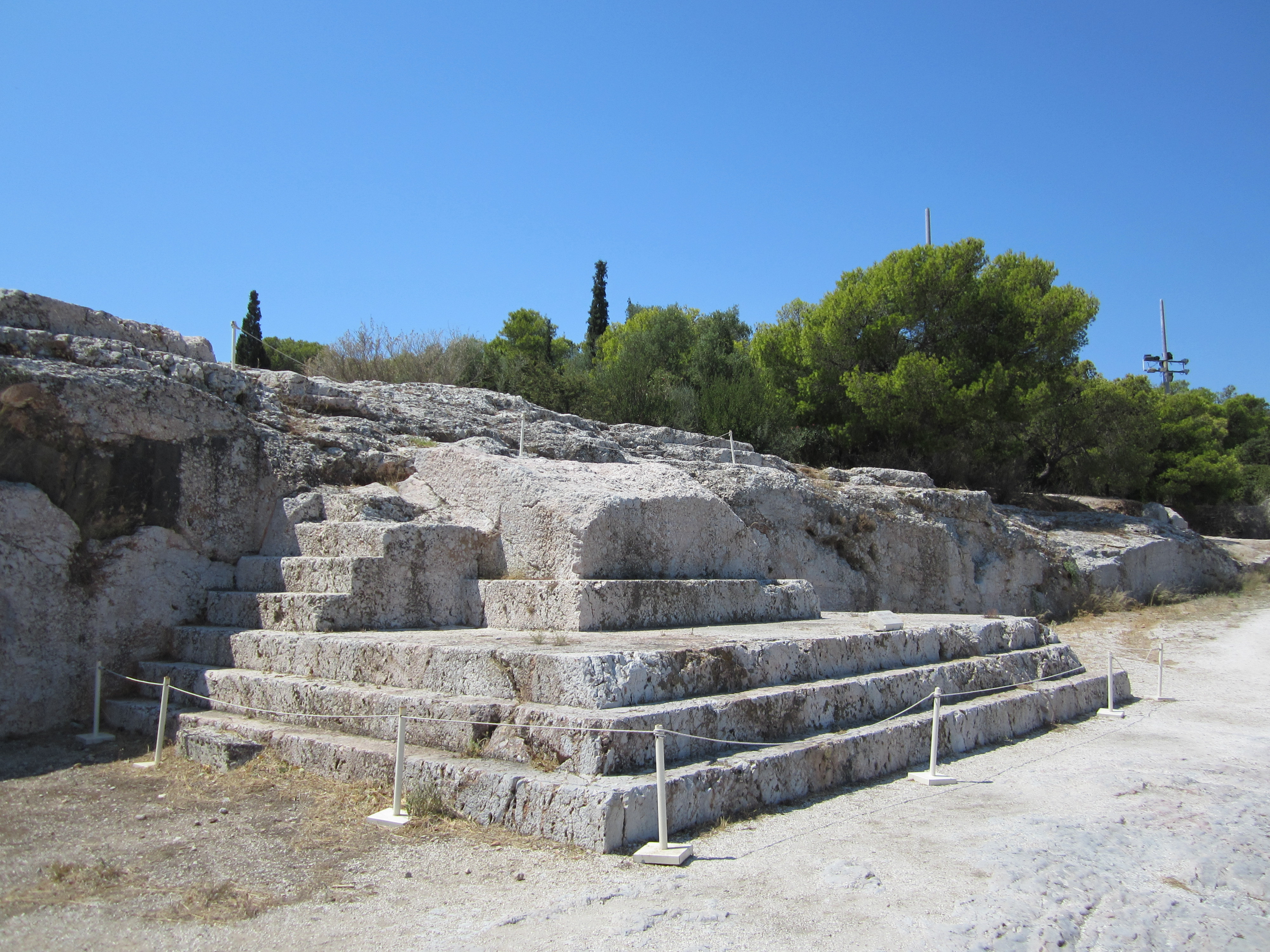
The Pnyx. As a meeting place, it was the heart of Athenian democracy

Since the beginning of antiquity, monarchy confronted several republican forms of government, wherein executive power was in the hands of a number of people that elected leaders in a certain way instead of appointing them by hereditary succession. During the archaic period (c. 750–500 BCE), kingship disappeared in almost all Greek poleis, and also in Rome (then still a barely significant town). After the demise of kingship, the Greek city-states were initially most often led by nobility (aristocracy), after which their economic and military power base crumbled. Next, in almost all poleis tyrants usurped power for two generations (tyranny, 7th and especially 6th century BCE), after which gradually forms of governments led by the wealthy (oligarchy) or assemblies of free male citizens (democracy) emerged in Classical Greece (mainly after 500 BCE). Athenian democracy (6th century–322 BCE) is the best-known example of the latter form; classical Sparta (c. 550–371 BCE) was a militaristic polis with a remarkable mix between monarchy (dual kingship), aristocracy (Gerousia) and democracy (Apella); the Roman Republic (c. 509–27 BCE) had a mixed constitution of oligarchy, democracy and especially aristocracy. The city-states of the Etruscan civilization (which arose during the Villanovan period, c. 900–700 BCE) appear to have followed a similar pattern, with the original monarchies being overthrown and replaced by oligarchic republics in the 5th and 4th centuries BCE.

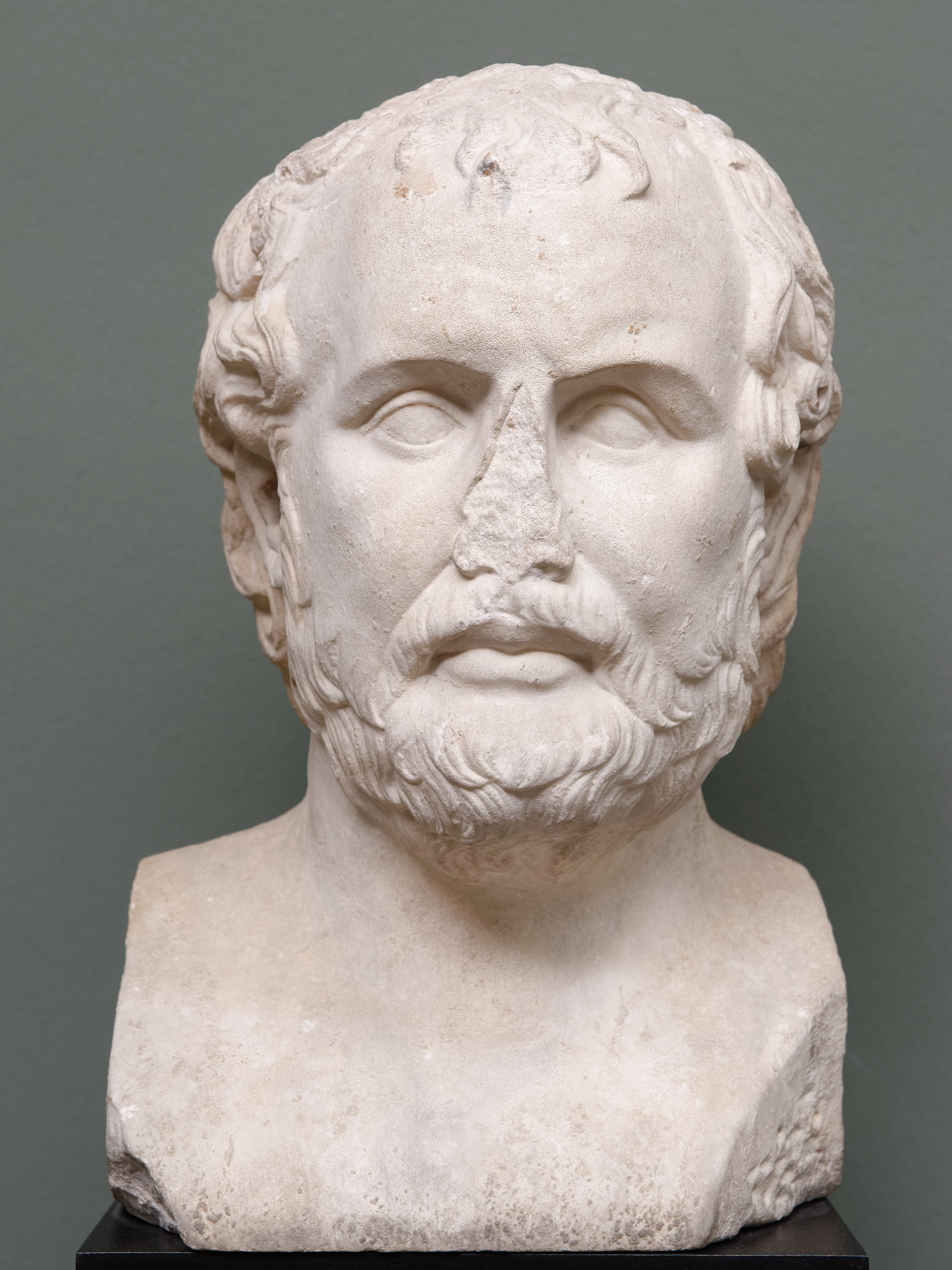
King Philip II united all Greek poleis under his crown in 338 BCE.

The dominant poleis of Athens and Sparta were weakened by warring each other, especially during the Peloponnesian War (431–404 BCE) won by Sparta. They were defeated and ruled by Thebes for a time (371–360 BCE), after which Sparta's role was over. Eventually, all of Greece was subjugated by the Macedonian monarchy in 338 BCE, that put an end to the era of free autonomous city-states, and Athenian democracy as well in 322 BCE. In the subsequent Hellenistic period (334–30 BCE) numerous diadochs (successors of Alexander the Great) fought one another for the kingship of Macedon, definitively obtained by the Antigonids in 277 BCE. Meanwhile, the Phoenician city-state of Carthage, located in present-day Tunisia, aside from settling large swaths of North Africa's coast, also set up several colonies on Sicily, Sardinia, Corsica, the Baleares and in southern Iberia. The Carthaginian empire, according to tradition founded in 814 BCE, started out as a monarchy, but in the 4th century transformed into a republic where suffets ("judges") ruled. Finally, Rome gradually conquered all of Italy (primarily after 350 BCE), and defeated Carthage in the Punic Wars (264–146 BCE). In 168, Macedon was subdued by the Romans, and partitioned into four client republics. These were annexed as Roman provinces in 148, as happened to Greece in 146, making Rome's territory envelop all of literate Europe. The remainder of Iberia, the Illyrian coast and eventually Gaul by general Julius Caesar were added to the Roman Republic, which however was experiencing an institutional crisis. After defeating his rival Pompey, Caesar was appointed dictator to restore order. He almost managed to found a dynasty in the process, but was killed by a republican cabal led by Brutus in 44 BCE.

=== Roman Empire and legacy ===
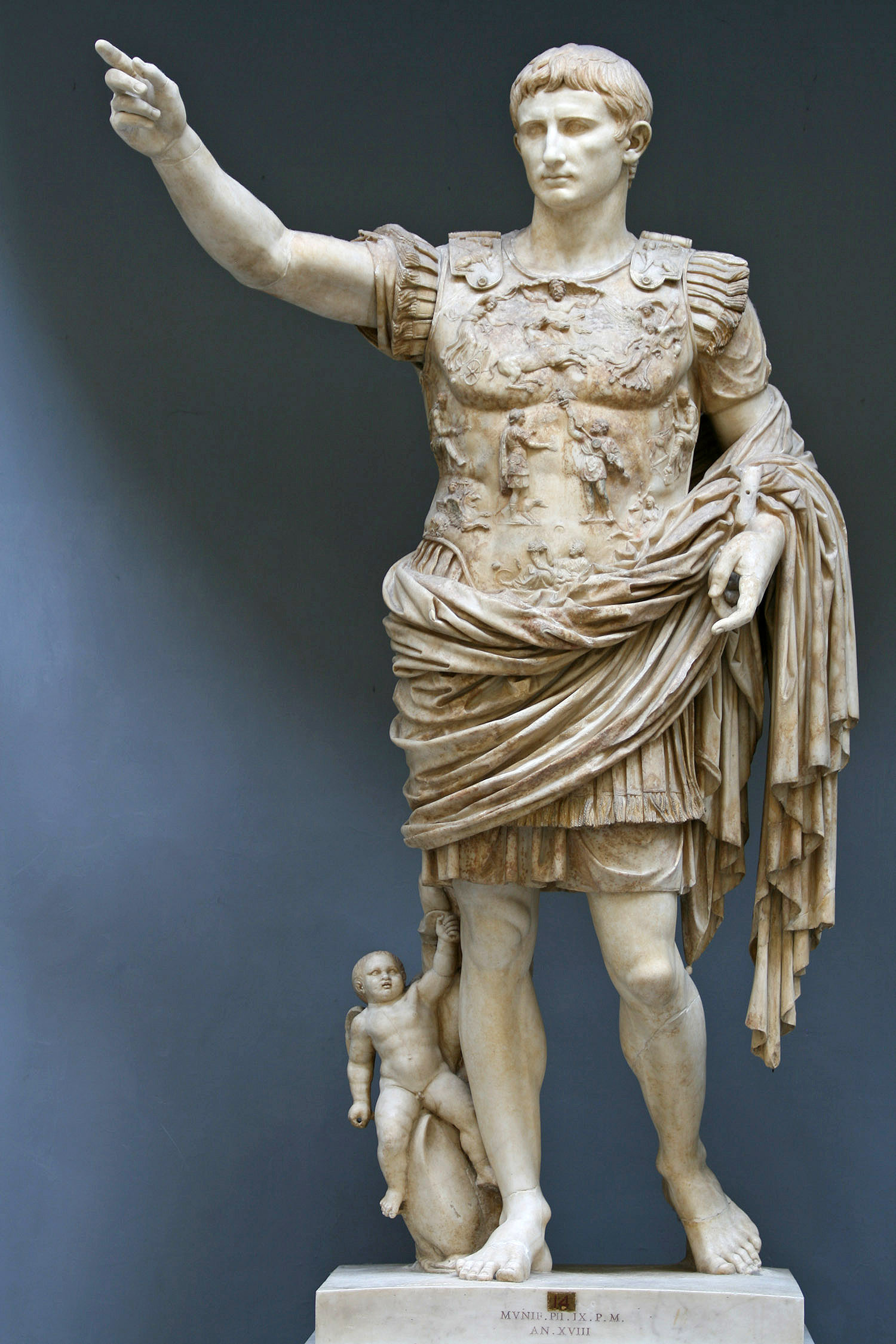
Augustus, the first Roman Emperor (r. 27 BCE–14 CE)

Caesar's adoptive son Octavian prevailed in the ensuing civil war, and converted the Roman Republic into the Roman Empire in 27 BCE. He took on the name Augustus, with the rather humble title of princeps ("first [citizen]"), as if he were merely primus inter pares ("first among equals"), when he had in fact founded a monarchy. This limited emperorship (Principate) was strengthened in 284 by Diocletian to absolute reign (Dominate). The Empire recognised various client kingdoms under imperial suzerainty; most of these were in Asia, but tribal client kings were also recognized by the Roman authorities in Britannia. Most of the barbarian kingdoms established in the 5th century (the kingdoms of the Suebi, Burgundi, Vandals, Franks, Visigoths, Ostrogoths) recognised the Roman Emperor at least nominally, and Germanic kingdoms would continue to mint coins depicting the Roman emperor well into the 6th century. It was this derivation of the authority of kingship from the Christian Roman Empire that would be at the core of the medieval institution of kingship in Europe and its notion of the divine right of kings, as well as the position of the Pope in Latin Christendom, the restoration of the Roman Empire under Charlemagne and the derived concept of the Holy Roman Empire in Western and Central Europe.

=== Early Modern Europe ===
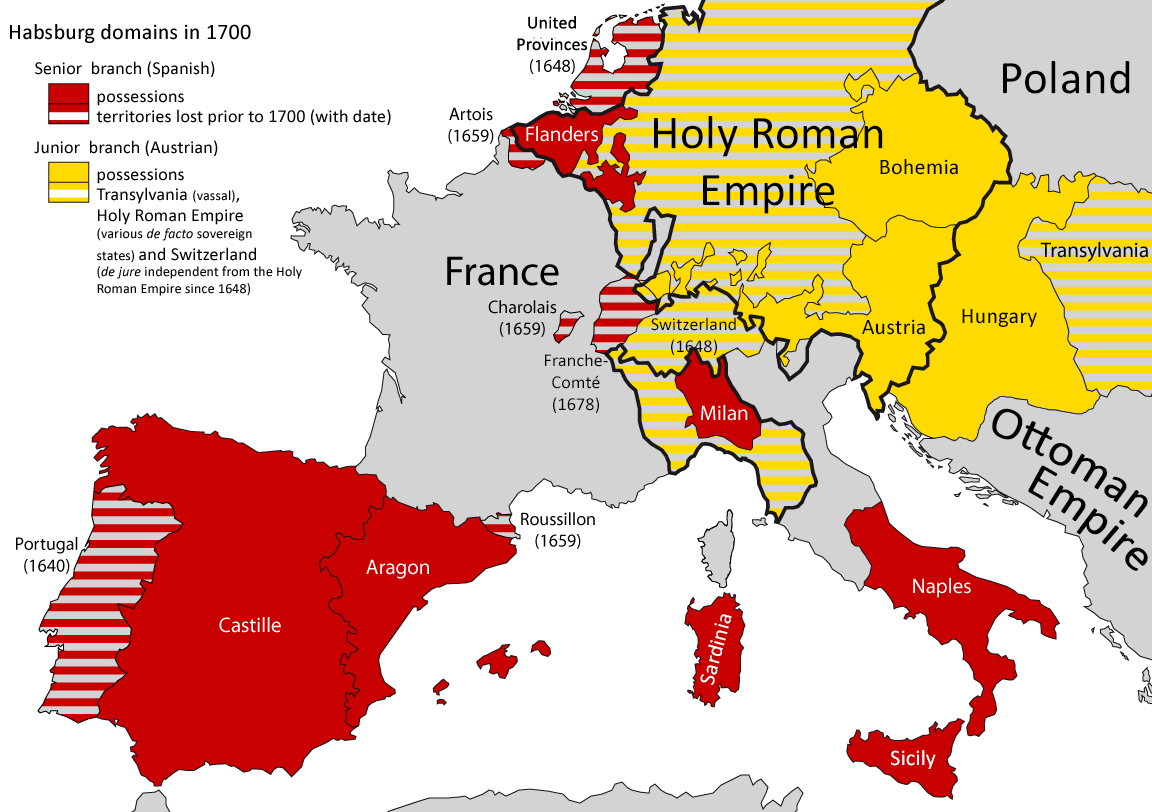
European dominions of the House of Habsburg in 1700

=== Modern Europe ===
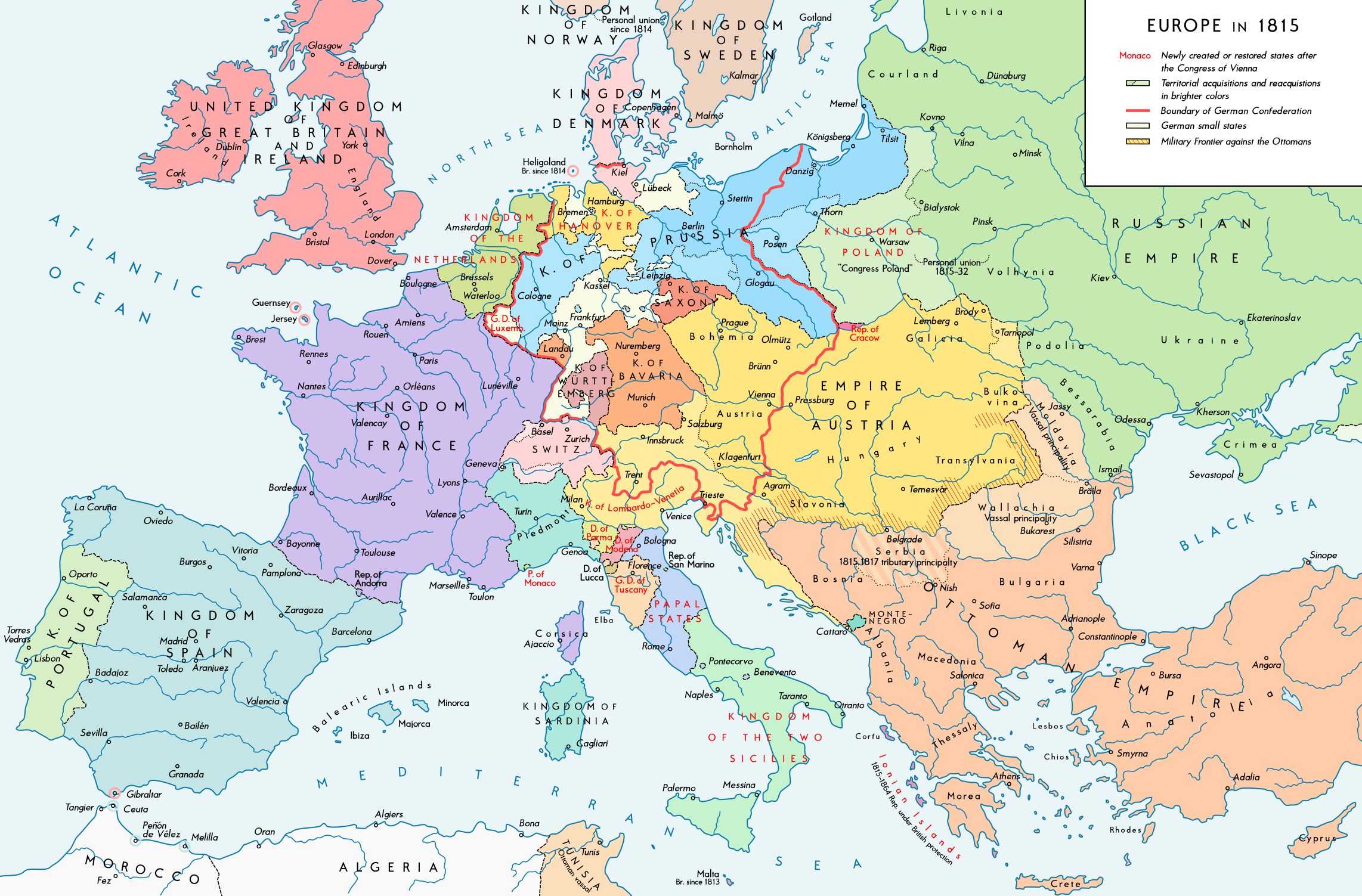
Map of Europe in 1815

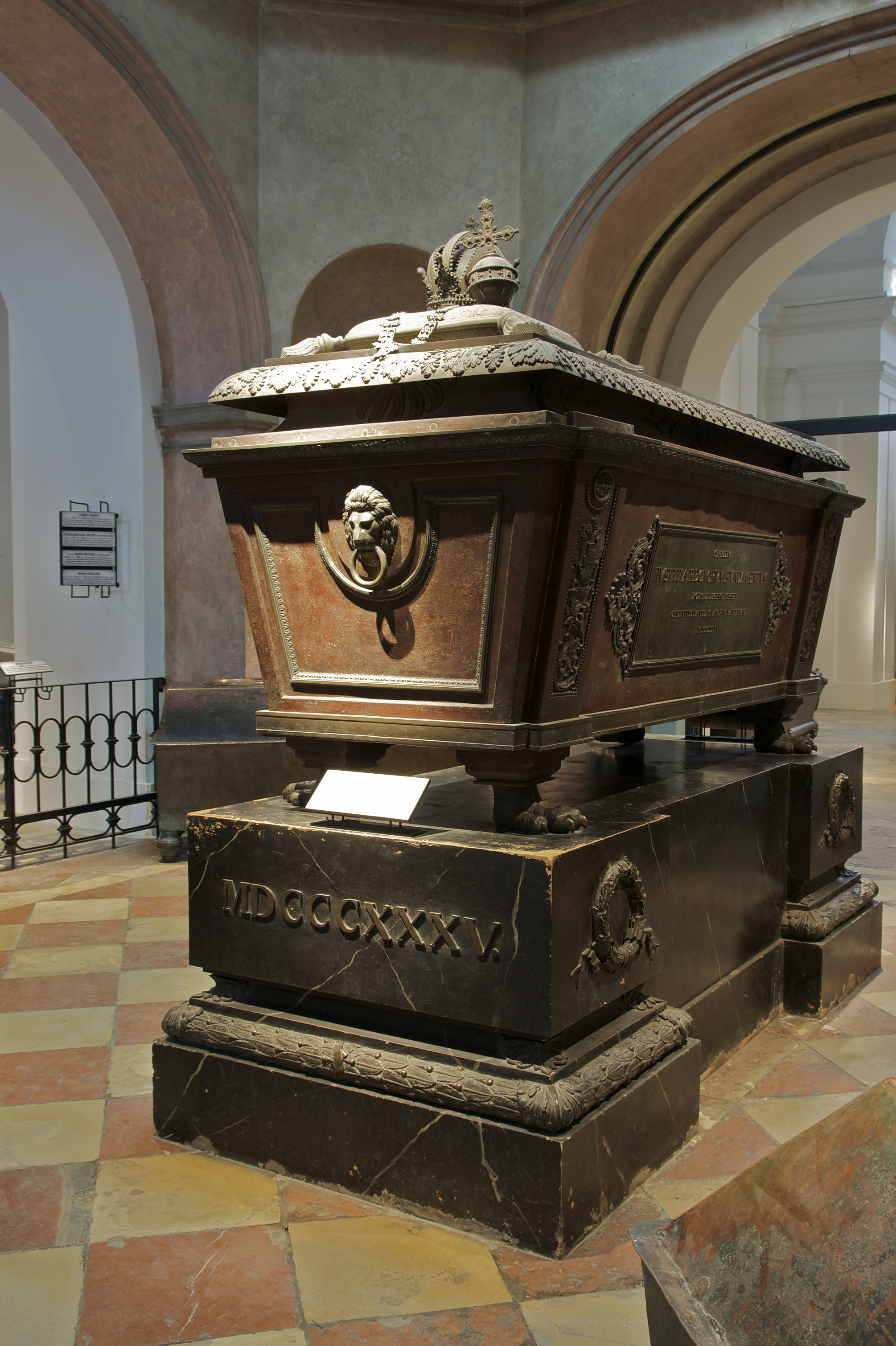
Sarcophagus of the last Holy Roman Emperor Francis II

The modern resurgence of parliamentarism and anti-monarchism began with the French Revolution (1789–99). The absolutist Kingdom of France was first transformed to a constitutional monarchy (1791–92), before being fully abolished on 21 September 1792, and eventually the former king even executed, to the other European courts' great shock. During the subsequent French Revolutionary Wars (1792–1799), the great European monarchies were unable to restore the monarchy; instead, the French First Republic expanded and annexed neighbouring territories, or converted them into loyal sister republics. Meanwhile, the German Mediatization of 1803 thoroughly rearranged the political structure of the Holy Roman Empire, with many small principalities and all ecclesiastical lands being annexed by larger monarchies. After Napoleon seized power, however, he gradually constructed a new imperial order in French-controlled Europe, first by crowning himself Emperor of the French in 1804, and then converting the sister republics into monarchies ruled by his relatives. In July 1806 due to Napoleon's campaigns a larger number of states in the Western part of Germany seceded The Holy Roman Empire and this brought in August 1806 the emperor Francis II to decide dissolving the entire empire, bringing an end to 1833 years of history of Roman emperors in Europe.

Following Napoleon's defeat in 1814 and 1815, the reactionary Congress of Vienna determined that all of Europe should consist of strong monarchies (with the exception of Switzerland and a few insignificant republics). In France, the Bourbon dynasty was restored, replaced by the liberal July Monarchy in 1830, before the entire monarchy was again abolished during the Revolutions of 1848. The popular Napoleon III was able to proclaim himself Emperor in 1852, thus founding the Second French Empire.

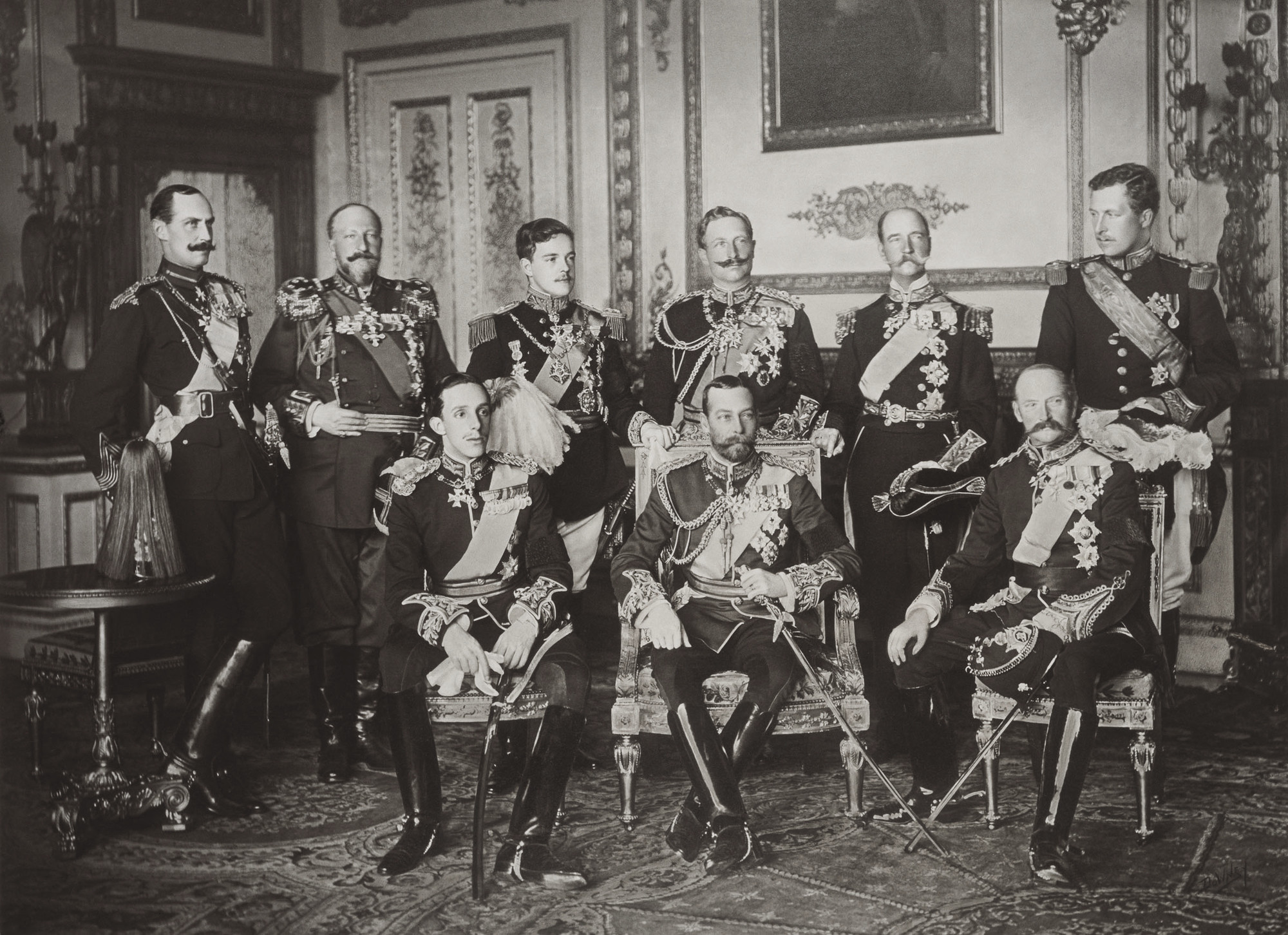
Nine sovereigns at Windsor for the funeral of King Edward VII in 1910

The kingdoms of Sicily and Naples ("Two Sicilies") were absorbed into the Kingdom of Sardinia to form the Kingdom of Italy in 1861. Austria and Prussia vied to unite all German states under their banner, with Prussia emerging victorious in 1866. It succeeded in provoking Napoleon III to declare war, leading to the defeat of France, and the absorption of the southern German states into the German Empire in the process (1870–71). From the ashes of the Second Empire rose the French Third Republic, the only great republican European power until World War I.

Much of 19th century politics was characterised by the division between anti-monarchist radicalism and monarchist conservatism. The Kingdom of Spain was briefly abolished in 1873, restored 1874–1931 and again in 1975 (or in 1947). The Kingdom of Portugal was abolished in 1910. The Russian Empire ended in 1917, the Kingdom of Prussia in 1918. The Kingdom of Hungary fell under Habsburg rule in 1867 and was dissolved in 1918 (restored 1920–1946). Likewise, the Kingdom of Bohemia under Habsburg rule was dissolved in 1918. The Ottoman sultanate was abolished in 1922 and replaced by the Republic of Türkiye the following year.

The Napoleonic Wars transformed the political landscape of Europe, and a number of modern kingdoms were formed in a resurgence of monarchism after the dissolution of the Holy Roman Empire and the defeat of the French Empire:

- the Austrian Empire and Austria-Hungary (1804–1918)
- the Kingdom of Württemberg (1805–1918)
- the Kingdom of Bavaria (1805–1918)
- the Kingdom of Saxony (1806–1918)
- the Kingdom of the Two Sicilies (1808–1861)
- the Kingdom of the Netherlands (1813/15 to present)
- an independent constitution for the Kingdom of Norway (1814 to present)
- the Kingdom of France ("Bourbon Restoration") (1814–1830) followed by the July Monarchy (Kingdom of France) (1830–1848)
- the Kingdom of Hanover (1814–1866)
- the Kingdom of Poland (1815–1917), continued later as the Kingdom of Poland (1917–1918)
- the Kingdom of Belgium (1830 to present)
- the Kingdom of Greece (1832–1924 & 1935–1973)
- (France) the Second French Empire (1852–1870)
- the Principality of Montenegro (1852–1910) continued as the Kingdom of Montenegro (1910–1918)
- the Kingdom of Italy (1861–1946)
- the Principality of Romania (1862–1881) continued as the Kingdom of Romania (1882–1947)
- (Germany) the German Empire (1871–1918)
- the Principality of Bulgaria (1878–1908) continued as the Tsardom of Bulgaria (1908–1946)
- the Principality of Serbia (1815–1882) continued as the Kingdom of Serbia (1882–1918)
- the Principality of Albania (1914–1925)

Many countries abolished the monarchy in the 20th century and became republics, especially in the wake of either World War I or World War II.

==== New monarchies ====
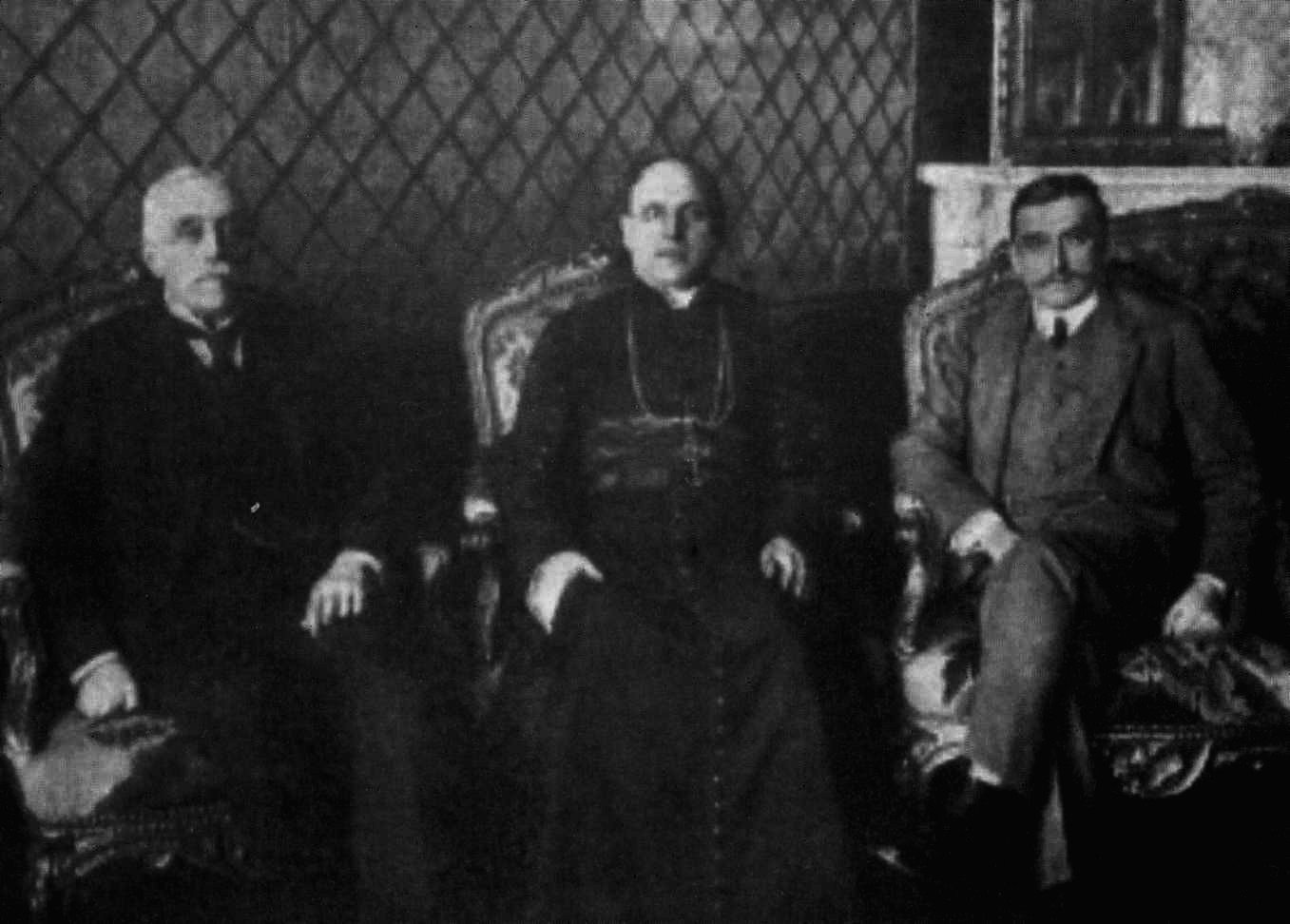
The Regency Council of the Kingdom of Poland (1917–1918) acted on behalf of the king that was never elected.

A few new monarchies emerged for a brief period of time in the final years of World War I:

- the Kingdom of Finland (1918–1919)
- the Kingdom of Lithuania (1918)
- the Ukrainian State (Hetmanate) (1918)
- the United Baltic Duchy (1918)

Monarchies established or re-established during the interbellum period were:

- the Kingdom of Iceland (1918–1944)
- the Kingdom of Yugoslavia (1918–1945)
- the Kingdom of Hungary (1920–1946)
- (Republic of Ireland) the Irish Free State (1922–1937)
- (Albanian Kingdom (1928–1939)) the Albanian Kingdom (1928–1944)
- the Vatican City State governed by the Holy See (1929 to present)
- the Kingdom of Greece (1935–1973)

Monarchies established or re-established from 1940 and onwards:

- the Kingdom of Croatia (1941–1943)
- the Kingdom of Spain (1947 to present)
- the Kingdom of Malta (State of Malta) (1964–1974)

=== Territorial evolution ===
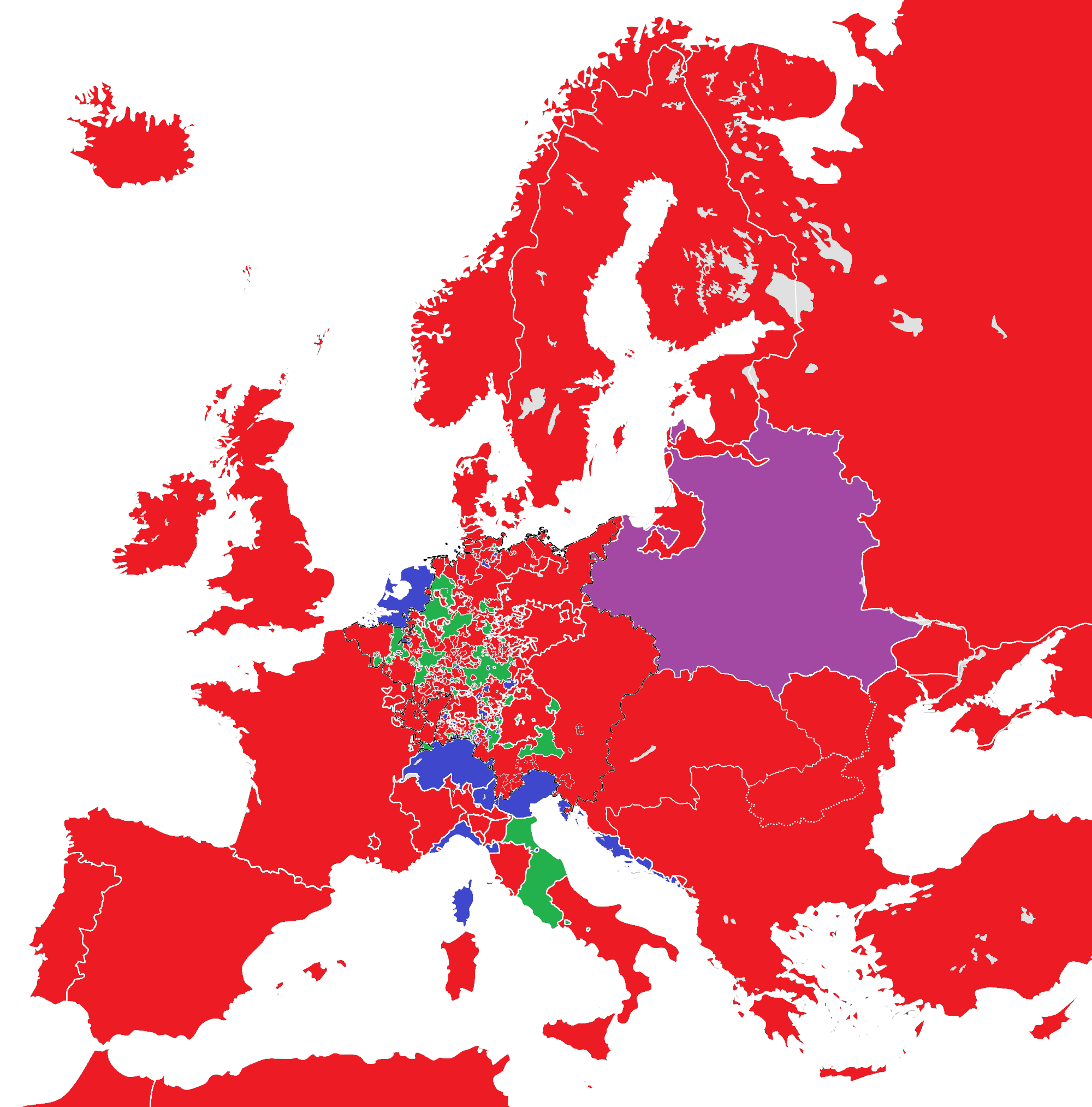
European states in 1714

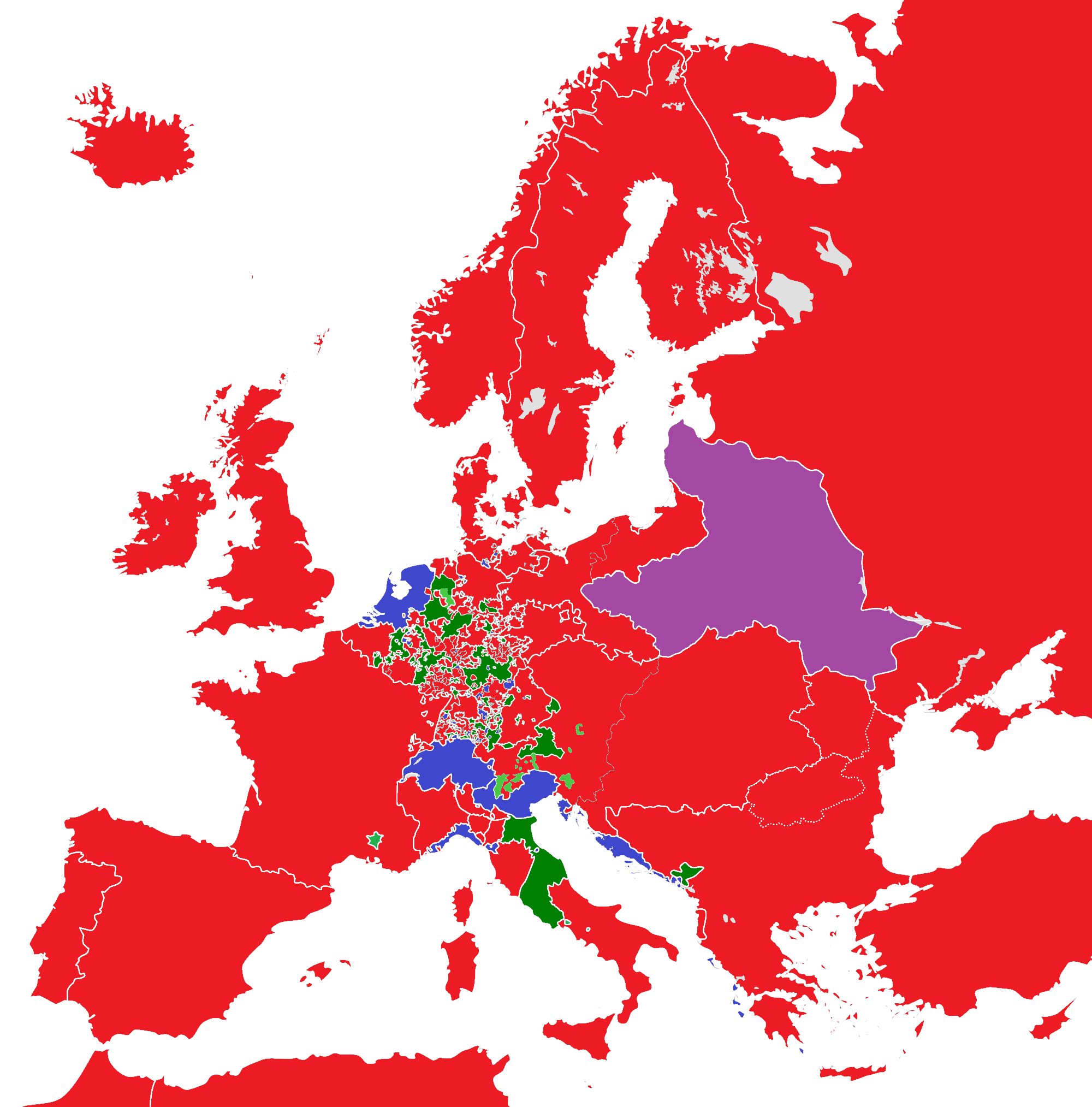
European states in 1789

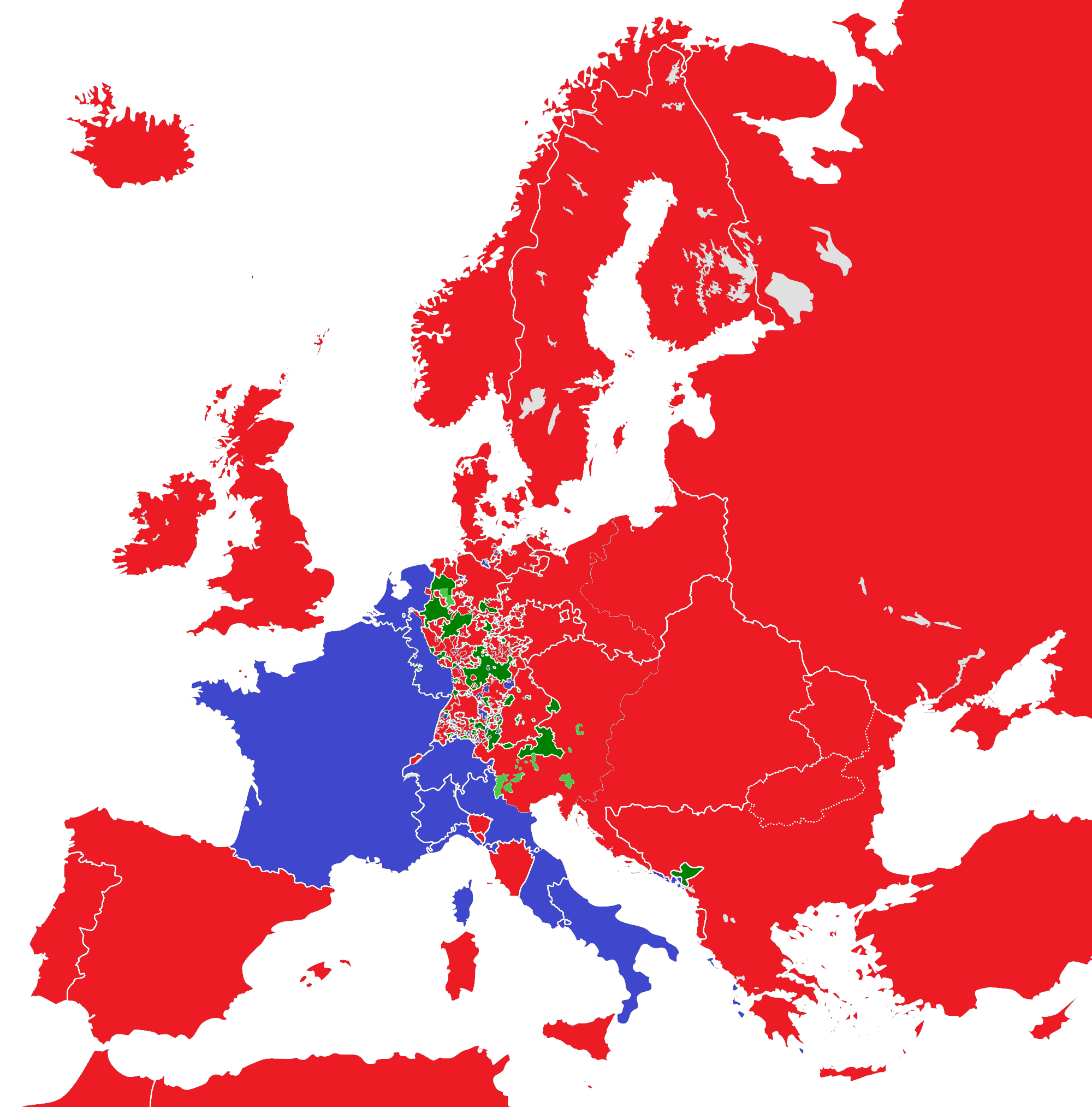
European states in 1799

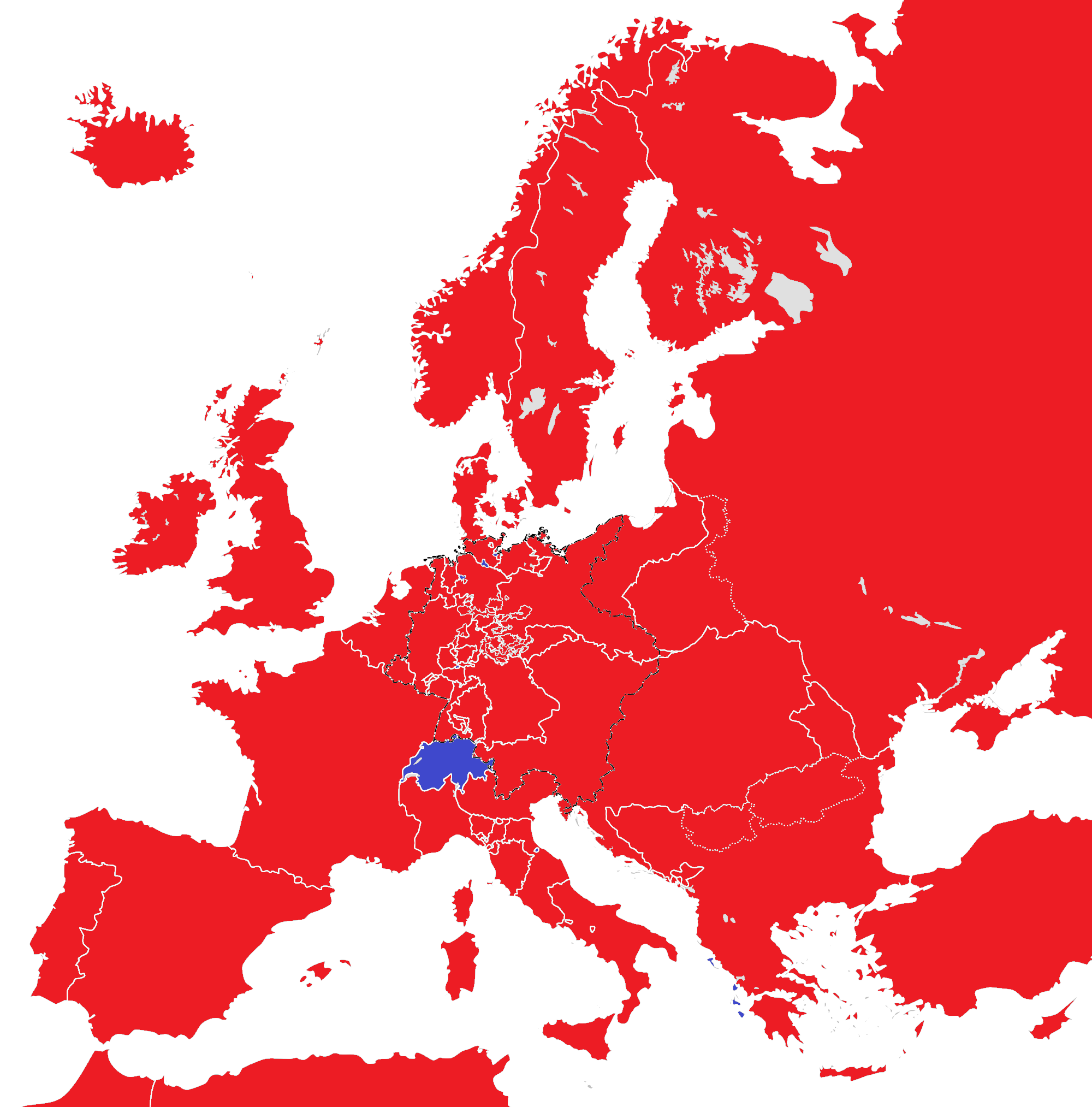
European states in 1815

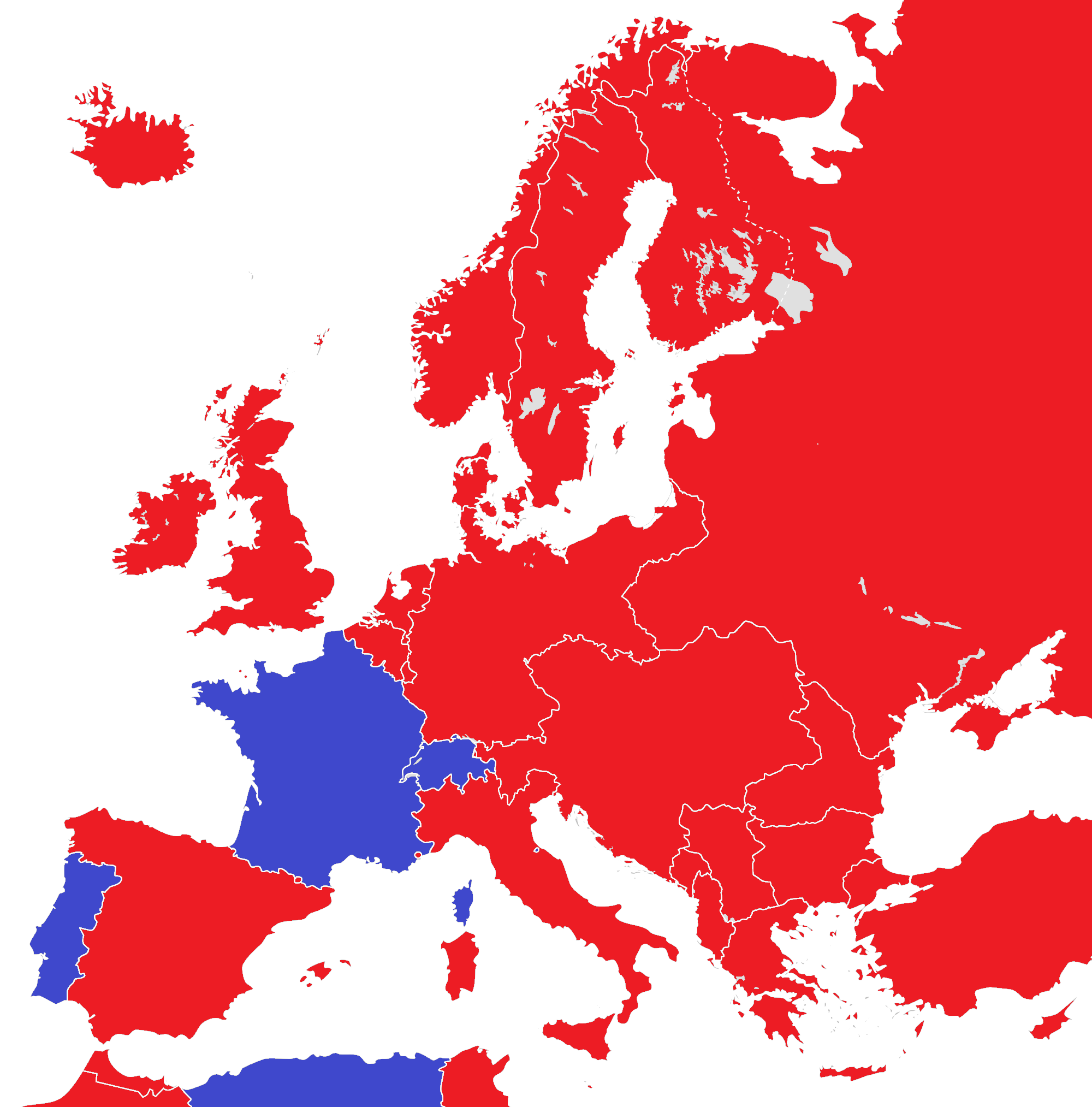
European states in 1914

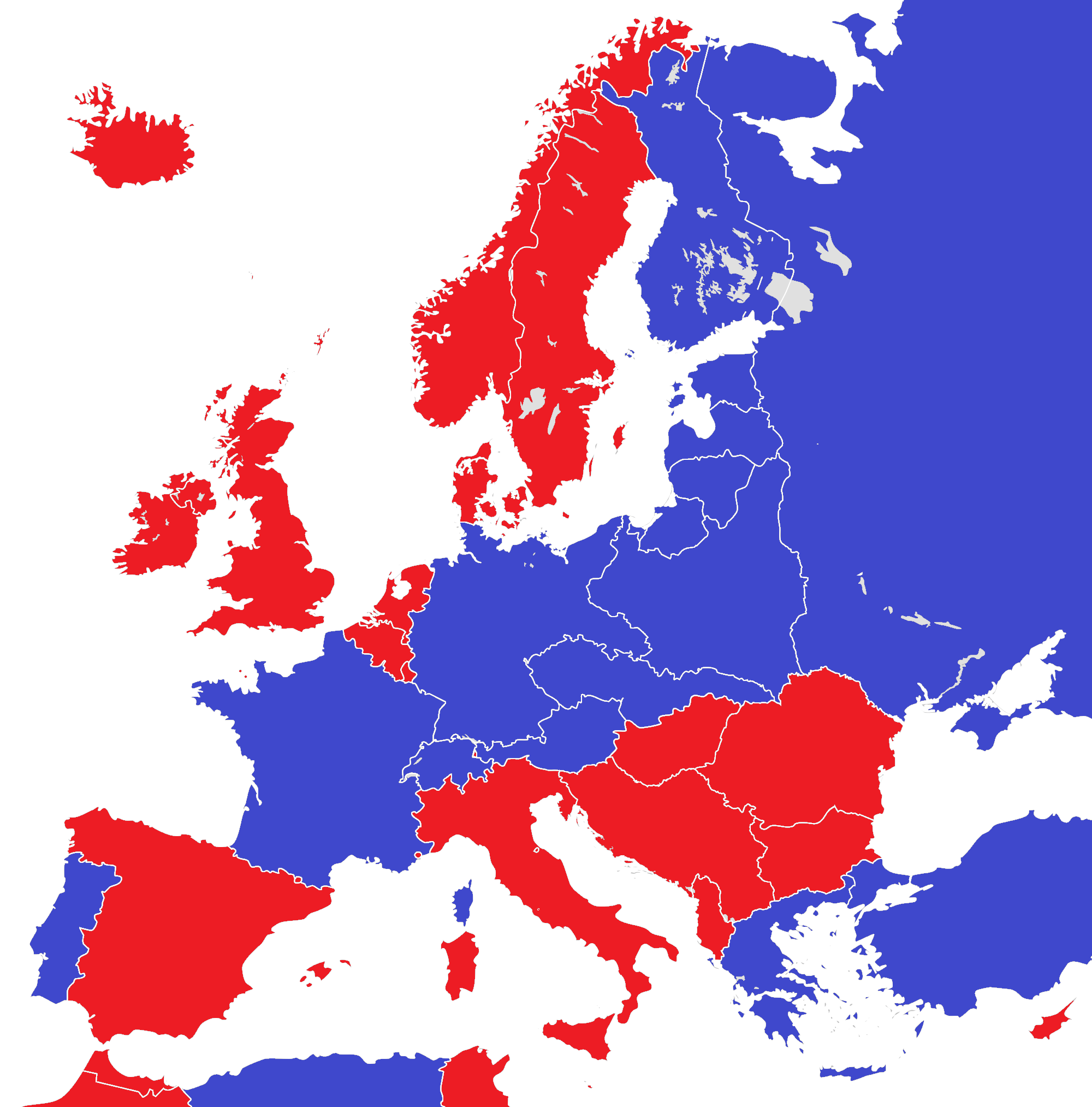
European states in 1930

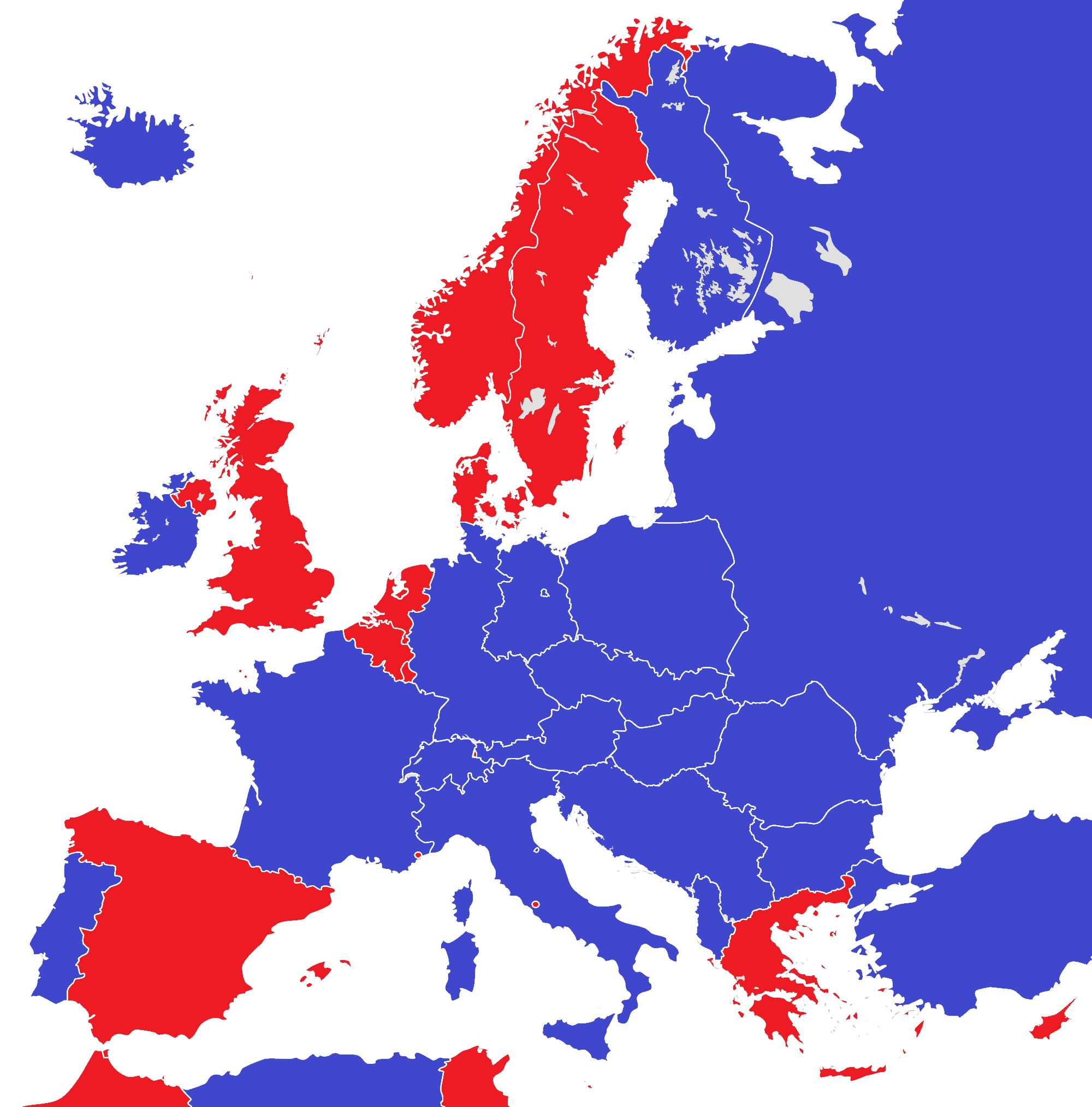
European states in 1950

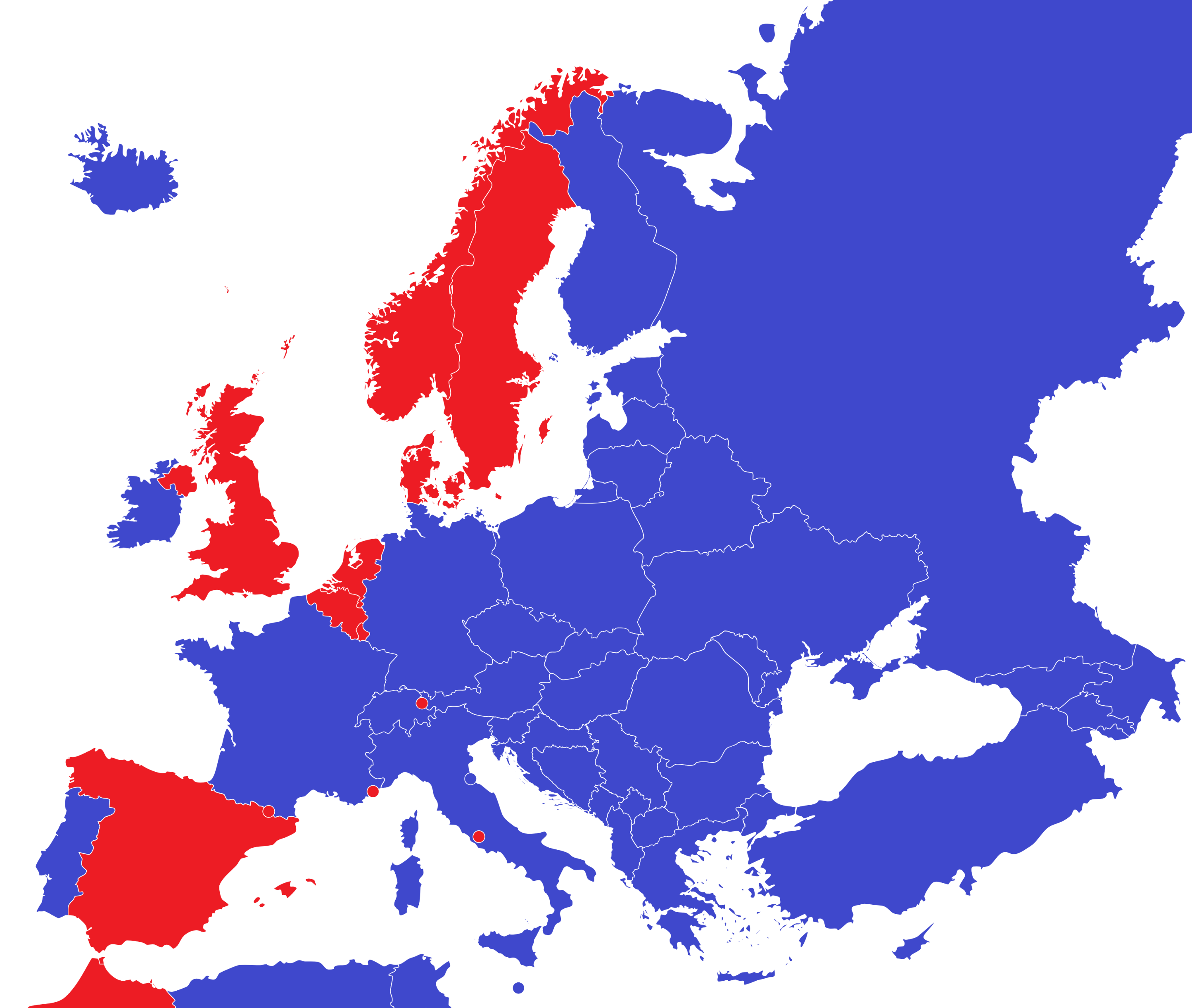
European states in 2015

Monarchies
Republics
Ecclesiastical lands
Polish–Lithuanian Commonwealth

== Current monarchies ==
There are currently twelve monarchies in Europe. Eleven of these are constitutional monarchies while one (the Vatican City State) is an absolute monarchy.

=== Table of monarchies in Europe ===
State	Type	Succession	Dynasty	Title	Monarch	Reigning since	First in line
Principality of Andorra	Constitutional	Ex officio	Bishop of Urgel	Co-prince	Josep-Lluís Serrano Pentinat	31 May 2025	None; appointed by the Pope
Principality of Andorra	Constitutional	Ex officio	President of France	Co-prince	Emmanuel Macron	14 May 2017	None; successor elected in the next French presidential election
Kingdom of Belgium	Constitutional	Hereditary	Belgium	King	Philippe	21 July 2013	Heir apparent: Princess Elisabeth, Duchess of Brabant (eldest child)
Kingdom of Denmark	Constitutional	Hereditary	Glücksburg	King	Frederik X	14 January 2024	Heir apparent: Christian, Crown Prince of Denmark (eldest child)
Principality of Liechtenstein	Constitutional	Hereditary	Liechtenstein	Sovereign Prince	Hans-Adam II	13 November 1989	Heir apparent: Hereditary Prince Alois (eldest child)
Grand Duchy of Luxembourg	Constitutional	Hereditary	Nassau-Weilburg (Bourbon-Parma)	Grand Duke	Guillaume V	3 October 2025	Heir apparent: Prince Charles (eldest child)
Principality of Monaco	Constitutional	Hereditary	Grimaldi (Polignac)	Sovereign Prince	Albert II	6 April 2005	Heir apparent: Hereditary Prince Jacques (only legitimate son)
Kingdom of the Netherlands	Constitutional	Hereditary	Orange-Nassau (Amsberg)	King	Willem-Alexander	30 April 2013	Heir apparent: Princess Catharina-Amalia, Princess of Orange (eldest child)
Kingdom of Norway	Constitutional	Hereditary	Glücksburg	King	Haakon VIII	28 August 2026	Heir apparent: Crown Princess Ingrid Alexandra (eldest child)
Kingdom of Spain	Constitutional	Hereditary	Bourbon	King	Felipe VI	19 June 2014	Heir presumptive: Leonor, Princess of Asturias (elder daughter) (Note: Leonor is, as the reigning king's older daughter, the current heiress presumptive. Felipe VI has no sons.)
Kingdom of Sweden	Constitutional	Hereditary	Bernadotte	King	Carl XVI Gustaf	15 September 1973	Heir apparent: Crown Princess Victoria (eldest child)
United Kingdom of Great Britain and Northern Ireland	Constitutional	Hereditary	Windsor	King	Charles III (Note: The monarch of the United Kingdom is also the sovereign of the fourteen other Commonwealth realms.)	8 September 2022	Heir apparent: William, Prince of Wales (eldest child)
Vatican City State	Absolute	Elective	Bishop of Rome	Pope	Leo XIV	8 May 2025	None; successor is to be elected in the next papal conclave

=== Descriptions ===
==== Andorra ====
Andorra has been a co-principality since the signing of a paréage in 1278, when the count of Foix and the bishop of La Seu d'Urgell agreed to share sovereignty over the landlocked country. The principality was briefly annexed in 1396 and again in 1512–1513 by the Crown of Aragon. The first female prince to rule Andorra was Isabella, Countess of Foix (1398–1413). After the title of the count of Foix had been passed to the kings of Navarre, and after Henry of Navarre had become Henry IV of France, an edict was issued in 1607 which established the French head of state as the legal successor to the count of Foix in regard to the paréage. Andorra was briefly annexed for a third time by the First French Empire together with Catalonia in 1812–1813. After the Empire's demise, Andorra became independent again.

==== Belgium ====
Belgium has been a kingdom since 21 July 1831 without interruption, after it became independent from the United Kingdom of the Netherlands with Leopold I as its first king. While in a referendum held on 12 March 1950, 57.68 percent of the Belgians voted in favour of allowing Leopold III, whose conduct during World War II had been considered questionable and who had been accused of treason, to return to the throne; due to civil unrest, he opted to abdicate in favour of his son Baudouin on 16 July 1951.

==== Denmark ====
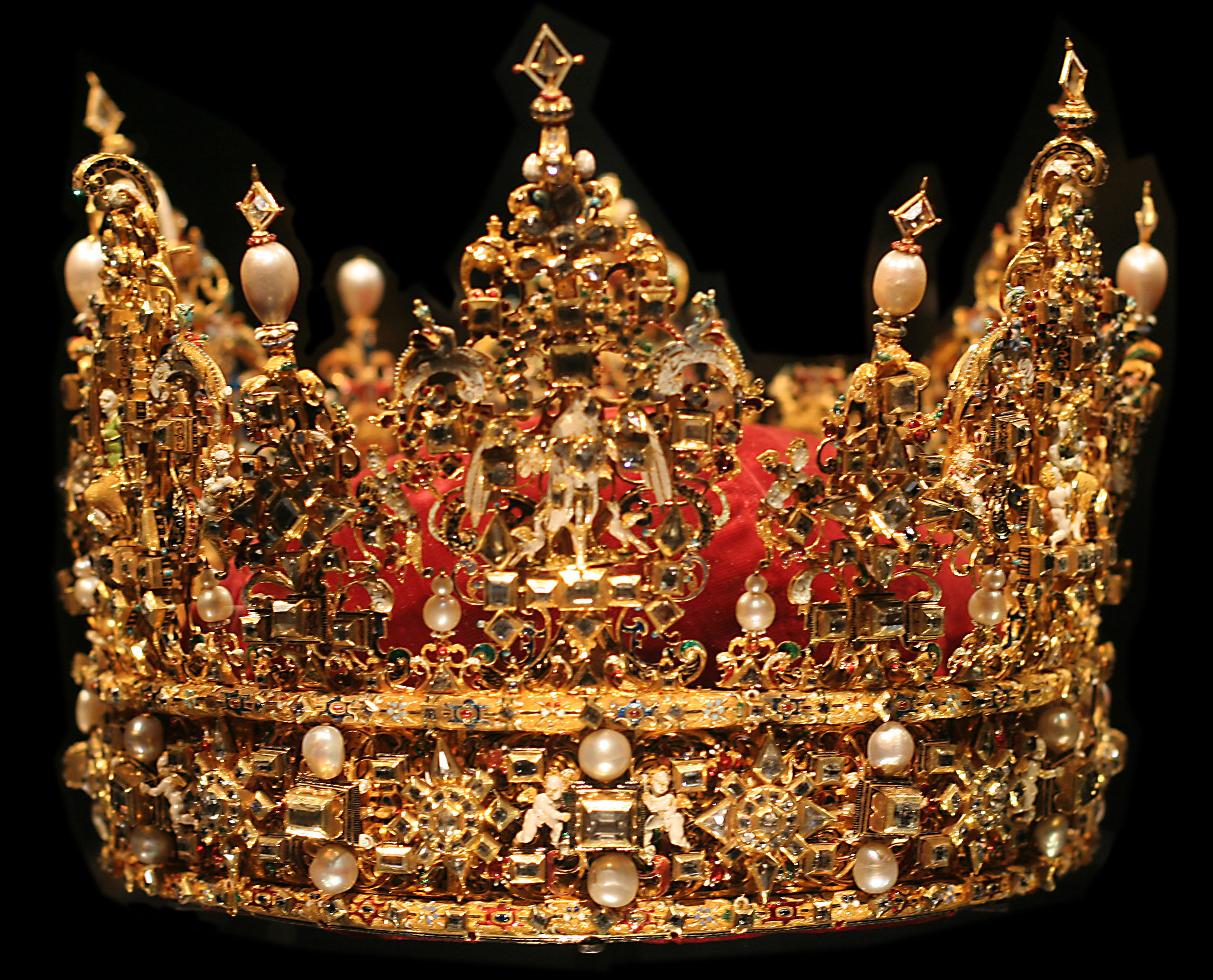
The crown of Christian IV, part of the Danish Crown Regalia

In Denmark, the monarchy goes back to the legendary kings before the 10th century and the Danish monarchy is the oldest in Europe (with the first attested historical king being Ongendus around the year 710). Currently, about 80 percent support keeping the monarchy.

==== Liechtenstein ====
Liechtenstein formally came into existence on 23 January 1719, when Charles VI, Holy Roman Emperor decreed the lordship of Schellenberg and the countship of Vaduz united and raised to the dignity of a principality. Liechtenstein was a part of the Holy Roman Empire until the Treaty of Pressburg was signed on 26 December 1805; this marked Liechtenstein's formal independence, though it was a member of the Confederation of the Rhine and the German Confederation afterwards. While Liechtenstein was still closely aligned with Austria-Hungary until World War I, it realigned its politics and its customs and monetary institutions with Switzerland instead. Having been a constitutional monarchy since 1921, Hans-Adam II demanded more influence in Liechtenstein's politics in the early 21st century, which he was granted in a referendum held on 16 March 2003, effectively making Liechtenstein a semi-constitutional monarchy again. However, technically speaking, Liechtenstein's monarchy remains fully constitutional, and the transition was merely from a parliamentary system to a semi-presidential system, and the constitutional changes also provide for the possibility of a referendum to abolish the monarchy entirely.

==== Luxembourg ====
Luxembourg has been an independent grand duchy since 9 June 1815. Originally, Luxembourg was in personal union with the United Kingdom of the Netherlands and the Kingdom of the Netherlands from 16 March 1815 until 23 November 1890. While Wilhelmina succeeded Willem III in the Netherlands, this was not possible in Luxembourg due to the order of succession being based on Salic law at that time; he was succeeded instead by Adolphe. In a referendum held on 28 September 1919, 80.34 percent voted in favour of keeping the monarchy.

==== Monaco ====
Monaco has been ruled by the House of Grimaldi since 1297. From 1793 until 1814, Monaco was under French control; the Congress of Vienna designated Monaco as being a protectorate of the Kingdom of Sardinia from 1815 until 1860, when the Treaty of Turin ceded the surrounding counties of Nice and Savoy to France. Menton and Roquebrune-Cap-Martin, part of Monaco until the mid-19th century before seceding in hopes of being annexed by Sardinia, were ceded to France in exchange for 4,000,000 French francs with the Franco-Monegasque Treaty in 1861, which also formally guaranteed Monaco its independence. Until 2002, Monaco would have become part of France had the house of Grimaldi ever died out; in a treaty signed that year, the two nations agreed that Monaco would remain independent even in such a case.

==== Netherlands ====
Though while not using the title of king until 1815, the Dutch Royal House has been an intricate part of the politics of the Low Countries since medieval times. In 1566, the stadtholder William of Orange became the main leader of the Dutch revolt against the Spanish Habsburgs that set off the Eighty Years' War and resulted in the formal independence of the United Provinces in 1581. He was born in the House of Nassau as Count of Nassau-Dillenburg. He became Prince of Orange in 1544 and is thereby the founder of the branch House of Orange-Nassau.

His descendants became de facto heads of state of the Dutch Republic during the 16th to 18th centuries, which was an effectively hereditary role. For the last half century of its existence, it became an officially hereditary role and thus a monarchy (though maintaining republican pretense) under Prince William IV. His son, Prince William V, was the last stadtholder of the republic, whose own son, King William I, became the first king of the United Kingdom of the Netherlands, which was established on 16 March 1815 after the Napoleonic Wars. With the independence of Belgium on 21 July 1831, the Netherlands formally became the Kingdom of the Netherlands.

==== Norway ====
Norway was united and thus established for the first time in 872, as a kingdom. As a result of the unification of the Norwegian petty kingdoms, which traces the monarchs even further back in time, both legitimate and semi–legendary kings. It is thus one of the oldest monarchies in the world, along with the Swedish and Danish ones. Norway was part of the Kalmar Union from 1397 until 1524, then part of Denmark–Norway from 1536 until 1814, and finally an autonomous part of the Union between Sweden and Norway from 1814 until 1905. Norway became completely independent again on 7 June 1905. Support for establishing a republic lies around 20 percent.

==== Spain ====
Spain came into existence as a single, united kingdom under Charles I of Spain on 23 January 1516. The monarchy was briefly abolished by the First Spanish Republic from 11 February 1873 until 29 December 1874. The monarchy was abolished again on 14 April 1931, first by the Second Spanish Republic – which lasted until 1 April 1939 – and subsequently by the dictatorship of Francisco Franco, who ruled until his death on 20 November 1975. Monarchy was restored on 22 November 1975 under Juan Carlos I, who was also the monarch until his abdication in 2014. The 1978 constitution confirms the title of the monarch is the King of Spain, but that he may also use other titles historically associated with the Crown, including the kingdoms of Castile and León, Aragon, the Two Sicilies, Jerusalem, Navarre, Granada, Seville, Toledo, Valencia, Galicia, Sardinia, Córdoba, Corsica, etc.

Data from 2006 suggested that only 25 percent of Spaniards were in favour of establishing a republic; however, the numbers have increased since Juan Carlos I abdicated.

==== Sweden ====
Sweden’s monarchy goes back to the semilegendary kings before the 10th century. The current royal family, the House of Bernadotte, has reigned since 1818.

==== United Kingdom ====
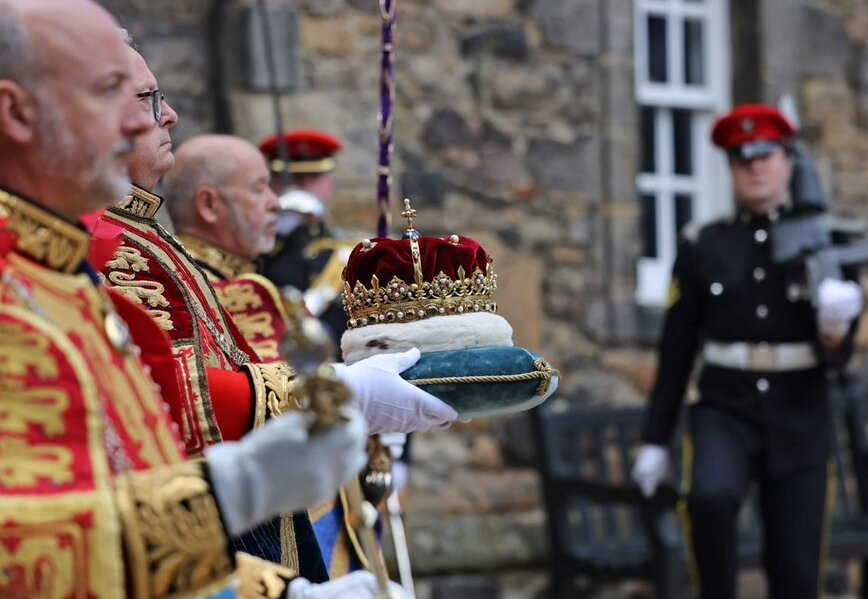
Having existed in its current form since 1540, the Crown of Scotland is one of the oldest in Europe still in ceremonial use

The monarchy of the United Kingdom can be defined to have started either with the Kingdom of Scotland or Kingdom of England in the 9th century, or with the Union of the Crowns of Scotland and England upon the accession of James VI of Scotland to the throne of England in 1603, or with the Acts of Union 1707, which established the unified Kingdom of Great Britain. It was briefly interrupted by the Interregnum, from 1649 until the monarchy was restored under Charles II in 1660.

The Kingdom of Ireland was a dependency of the Kingdom of England from 1542 to 1707, and subsequently of the Kingdom of Great Britain from 1707 to 1800, prior to the Acts of Union 1800, which created the United Kingdom of Great Britain and Ireland. Prior to 1801, the Kingdom of Ireland was ruled by the monarchs of England, initially Henry VIII, and from 1707 by those of Great Britain.

Support for establishing a republic instead of a monarchy was around 15 percent in the United Kingdom in 2024, and while 58 percent favour retaining the monarchy, 38 percent would prefer an elected head of state.

The monarch of the United Kingdom is also the monarch of the 14 other Commonwealth realms, none of which are in Europe. Some of these realms have significant levels of support for republicanism.

==== Vatican City ====
Differently from the Holy See, in existence for almost two thousand years, the Vatican City was not a sovereign state until the 20th century. In the 19th century the annexation of the Papal States by the Kingdom of Sardinia, and the subsequent establishment of the Kingdom of Italy, was not recognized by the Vatican. However, Italy and the Vatican recognized each other in the Lateran Treaty of 1929. The monarch of the Vatican City State is the pope.

=== Succession laws ===
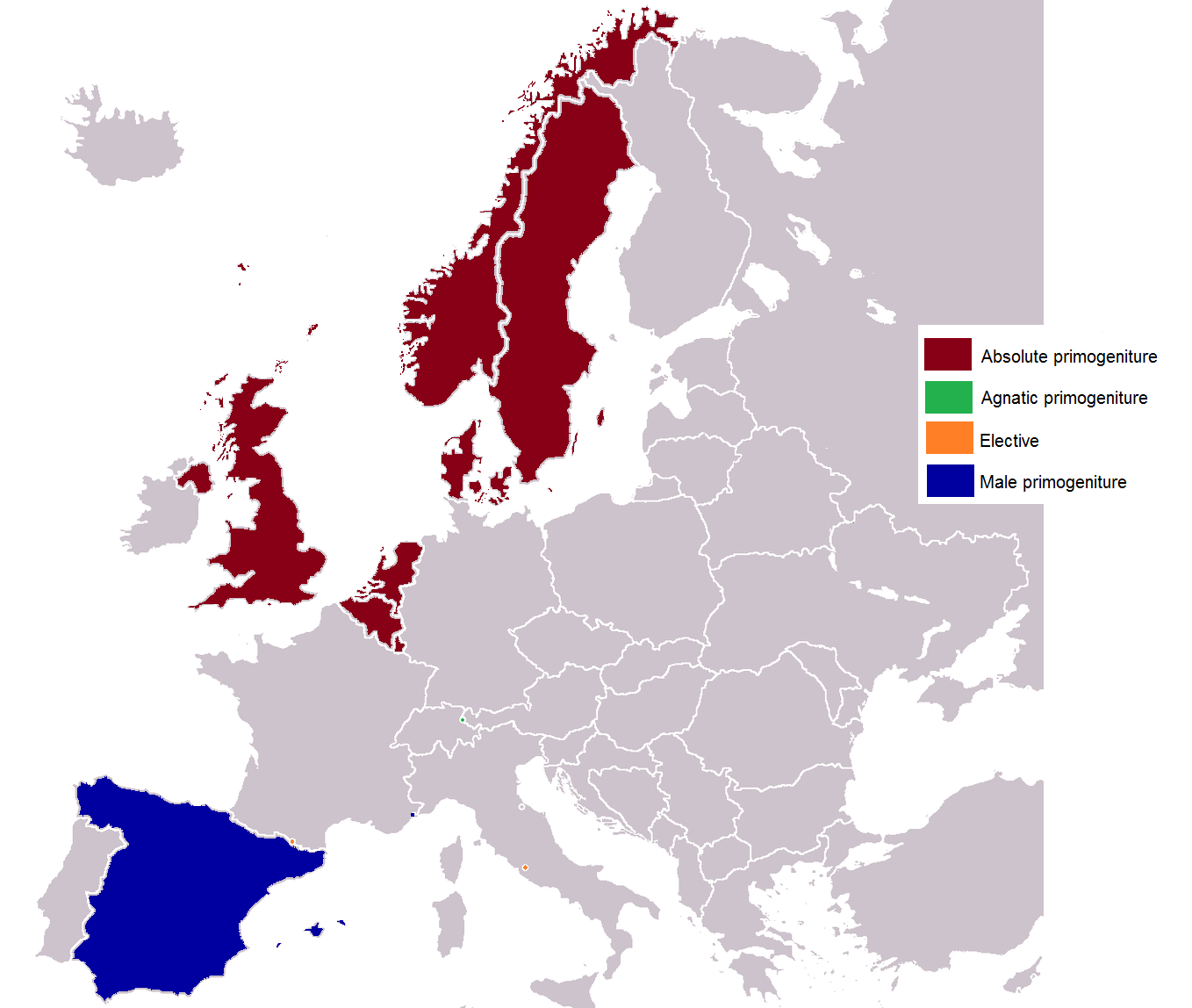
European monarchies by succession. Absolute primogeniture Agnatic primogeniture Elective Male-primogeniture

The succession order is determined by primogeniture in most European monarchies. Belgium, Denmark, Liechtenstein, Luxembourg, the Netherlands, Norway, Sweden and the United Kingdom now adhere to absolute primogeniture, whereby the eldest child inherits the throne, regardless of gender; Monaco and Spain have the older system of male-preference primogeniture.

In 1990, Norway granted absolute primogeniture to the Norwegian throne, meaning that the eldest child, regardless of gender, takes precedence in the line of succession. This was not, however, done retroactively (as, for example, Sweden had done in 1980), meaning that the future Haakon VIII continued to take precedence over his older sister, and eventually inherited the throne ahead of her.

There are plans to change to absolute primogeniture in Spain through a rather complicated process, as the change entails a constitutional amendment. Two successive parliaments will have to pass the law by a two-thirds majority and then put it to a referendum. As parliament has to be dissolved and new elections have to be called after the constitutional amendment is passed for the first time, then Prime Minister of Spain José Luis Rodríguez Zapatero indicated he would wait until the end of his first term in 2008 before passing the law, although this deadline passed without the referendum being called. The amendment enjoys strong public support.

To change the order of succession to the British throne, all the sovereign states with the King as head of state—collectively known as Commonwealth realms—must agree. In the United Kingdom, the Succession to the Crown Act 2013 was enacted, and after legislation in some other realms, the changes came into effect across all realms simultaneously on 26 March 2015.

Until 2026, Liechtenstein used agnatic primogeniture (aka Salic law), which completely excluded women from the order of succession. It was criticised for this by a United Nations committee for this perceived gender equality issue in November 2007. On 15 August 2026, Liechtenstein switched to absolute primogeniture. The change was not applied retroactively.

Luxembourg used agnatic-cognatic primogeniture until 20 June 2011, when absolute primogeniture was introduced.

The co-princes of Andorra are the president of the French Republic, who is elected by the French people, and the bishop of La Seu d'Urgell, who is appointed by the pope.

The absolute monarch of Vatican City, the pope, is elected by the College of Cardinals.

=== Costs ===
One issue that occasionally rises is whether the monarchies are too expensive when compared to republics, or whether particular monarchies are more expensive than others, to maintain. This comparison may be hard to draw, since financial administration may differ radically from country to country, and not all profits and costs are publicly known, and because of different arrangements regarding the private property of the monarch. In the UK, the Crown Estate has a special legal status making it neither government property nor the private property of the monarch. Revenues from these hereditary possessions have been placed at the disposition of the British government (thus proceeding directly to the Treasury) by every monarch since the accession of George III in 1760; the revenues of GBP 304.1 million (fiscal year of 2015/16) far exceed the expenses of the British royal family in this sense resulting in a "negative cost" of the British monarchy.

In 2016, Dutch newspaper de Volkskrant published an overview of the annual expenditure (excluding security expenses) of all European royal houses (not counting Luxembourg and the four monarchical European microstates).

Country	Annual costs (royal house)	Annual salary (monarch)	Does monarch pay taxes?	Annual costs (royal house, per taxpayer)
Belgium	€36 million	€11.5 million	Yes	€3.15
Denmark	€13 million	€10 million	Only inheritance tax and property tax	€2.30
Netherlands	€41 million	€0.9 million	No	€2.40
Norway	€51 million	€1.2 million	No	€9.70
Spain	€8 million	€0.2 million	Yes	€0.16
Sweden	€13 million	€6.7 million	Yes	€1.30
United Kingdom	€45 million	€15.6 million	Yes	€0.70

Source: de Volkskrant (2016), based on the royal houses' websites of the seven monarchies, professor Herman Matthijs' 2013 study, the Dutch National Budget 2017, and ABCTOPConsult.

In 2013, professor Herman Matthijs from Ghent University calculated the costs of the seven EU monarchies plus Norway, and compared them to the EU's two most populous republics, France and Germany. His four main conclusions were:

- The personal salaries of presidents are lower than those of monarchs;
- The transparency differs between republics and monarchies, and is formally regulated in republics;
- In republics, pension costs of former heads of state are higher, although the figures don't say so;
- The existence of subsidies to family members of the heads of state in some monarchies increases their expenses.

He stressed that the financial administration's transparency differs enormously between countries; especially the non-transparent monarchies may be much more expensive than is publicly known. This means comparing them to republics, especially the very transparent administration of France where citizens can know exactly what they pay for, may be unfair. In a 2015 interview with NRC Handelsblad, Matthijs commented that the then-known €7.7 million allotted to the royal house in Spain's national budget was 'unbelievable': "I can't find out more, but I understand from the media that the total expenses of the Spanish house may be as much as 80 million."

Country	Form of government	Official annual costs	Transparency
Belgium	Monarchy	€13.9 million	Not transparent
Denmark	Monarchy	€13.2 million	Not transparent
France	Republic	€106.2 million	Very transparent
Germany	Republic	€25.6 million	Relatively transparent
Luxembourg	Monarchy	€9.3 million	Not transparent
Netherlands	Monarchy	€39.9 million	Relatively transparent
Norway	Monarchy	€42.7 million	Relatively transparent
Spain	Monarchy	€7.9 million	Not transparent
Sweden	Monarchy	€15.1 million	Not transparent
United Kingdom	Monarchy	€38.0 million	Poorly transparent
Source: Herman Matthijs, "De kosten van een staatshoofd in West-Europa" (2013).

=== Calls for abolition ===
Calls for the abolition of Europe's monarchies were widespread since the development of republicanism in the 17th to 18th centuries during the Enlightenment. During the French Revolution, the Ancien Régime in France was abolished, and in all territories the French First Republic conquered during the following Coalition Wars, sister republics were proclaimed. However, after Napoleon crowned himself Emperor of the French in 1804, all of these (except Switzerland) were converted back to monarchies headed by his relatives. The post-Napoleonic European Restoration reaffirmed the monarchical balance of power on the continent.

In subsequent decades, republicanism would regain lost ground with the rise of liberalism, nationalism, and later socialism. The Revolutions of 1848 were largely inspired by republicanism. Most of Europe's monarchies were abolished either during or following World War I or World War II, and the remaining monarchies were transformed into constitutional monarchies.

Republican movements in Europe remain active up to present, though their political clout is limited in most European monarchies. The most prominent organisations campaigning to eliminate one or more of Europe's remaining monarchies and/or to liquidate assets reserved for reigning families are affiliated with the Alliance of European Republican Movements, but there are smaller independent initiatives as well, such as Hetis2013 in the Netherlands. Also, some political parties (e.g. Podemos in Spain) have stepped up and called for national referendums to abolish monarchies.

=== Calls for restoration ===
The political influence of monarchism in former European monarchies is very limited.

There are several monarchist parties in France, most notably the Action Française (established 1899) and Alliance Royale (established 2001). Monarchist parties also exist in the Czech Republic (1991), in Greece (2010), in Germany (1959), in Italy (1972), in Poland (1988) and in Russia (2012).

Otto von Habsburg renounced all pretense to the Habsburg titles in 1958, and monarchism in Austria has next to no political influence; a German monarchist organisation called Tradition und Leben existed from 1959 to 2022. Monarchism in Bavaria has had more significant support, including Franz Josef Strauss, minister-president of Bavaria from 1978 to 1988.

Alexander, Crown Prince of Yugoslavia is a proponent of re-creating a constitutional monarchy in Serbia and sees himself as the rightful king. He believes that monarchy could give Serbia "stability, continuity and unity". A number of political parties and organizations support a constitutional parliamentary monarchy in Serbia. The Serbian Orthodox Church has openly supported the restoration of the monarchy. The assassinated former Serbian Prime Minister Zoran Đinđić was often seen in the company of the prince and his family, supporting their campaigns and projects, although his Democratic Party never publicly embraced monarchy. In 2011 an online open access poll by Serbian middle-market tabloid newspaper Blic showed that 64% of Serbians support restoring the monarchy. Another poll in May 2013 had 39% of Serbians supporting the monarchy, with 32% against it. On 27 July 2015, newspaper Blic published a poll "Da li Srbija treba da bude monarhija?" ("Should Serbia be a monarchy?"); 49.8% respondents expressed support in a reconstitution of monarchy, 44.6% were opposed and 5.5% were indifferent. In 2017 an NGO, the Kingdom of Serbia Association, announced that in 2016 they had collected over 123,000 signatures of support for a referendum on restoring the monarchy, short of the 150,000 needed to force a constitutional amendment.

According to a 2007 opinion poll conducted at the request of the Romanian royal family, only 14% of Romanians were in favour of the restoration of the monarchy. Another 2008 poll found that only 16% of Romanians are monarchists. In December 2017, on the backdrop of the increased capital of trust in the Royal House of Romania, re-emerging with the death of King Michael, the executive chairman of the ruling Social Democratic Party Nicolae Bădălau said that one could organize a referendum on the transition to the monarchical ruling form, arguing that "it is not a bad thing, considering that the countries that have the monarchs are developed countries", being a project of the future.

== See also ==
- List of European Union member states by political system
- List of current monarchies
- List of monarchies
- List of dynasties
- Abolition of monarchy
- List of political systems in France
- Monarchies in the Americas
- Monarchies in Oceania
- Monarchies in Africa
- Monarchies in Asia

== Sources ==
- "CIA – The World Factbook". The World Factbook. Central Intelligence Agency. 11 July 2006. Archived from the original on 7 June 2007.
- "World Leaders". Central Intelligence Agency. 18 July 2006. Archived from the original on 12 June 2007.
