= Tulsky =

Tulsky (masculine), Tulskaya (feminine), or Tulskoye (neuter) may refer to:

- Tulsky District, in 1936–1962, name of the territory which is now a part of Maykopsky District of the Republic of Adygea, Russia
- Tulsky (rural locality) (Tulskaya, Tulskoye), name of several rural localities in Russia
- Tula Oblast (Tulskaya oblast), a federal subject of Russia
- Tulskaya (Moscow Metro), a station of the Moscow Metro
