= Tola =

Tola may refer to:

== Places ==
- Bella Tola, a mountain in the Pennine Alps in the Swiss canton of Valais
- La Tola, a town and municipality in the Nariño Department, Colombia
- Tola (Shakargarh), a village in Pakistan
- Tola, Rivas, a municipality in Nicaragua
- Tuul River, also Tola River, in Mongolia

== Other uses ==
- Tola (name)
- Tola (unit), Indian unit of mass
- Tola or Tula, variant transcriptions of Tuul, a river in Mongolia
- Tola (Parastrephia lepidophylla), a bush, typical of South American Puna grassland
- St Tola, a brand of goat cheese
- Tola, a chocolate by Nestle

== See also ==
- "Tola Tola", a song by Amitraj, Pankaj Padghan, Shashank Powar and Bela Shende from the 2015 Indian film Tu Hi Re
- Tula (disambiguation)
