= Toula =

Toula may refer to:

- Toula, Batroun a village in the district (Qada') of Batroun in Lebanon
- Toula, Burkina Faso
- Toula, Zgharta, a village in the district (Qada') of Zgharta in Lebanon
- Toula (Vava'u), a village on the main island of Vavaʻu in the kingdom of Tonga
- Tula, Russia, an industrial city in Russia
- Toula Portokalos, a character in the film My Big Fat Greek Wedding
- Toula, a character from the Australian TV series Pizza
