= Ciudad Tula =

Town in Tamaulipas, Mexico

Coordinates: 23°00′N 99°43′W

Tula
- Municipality
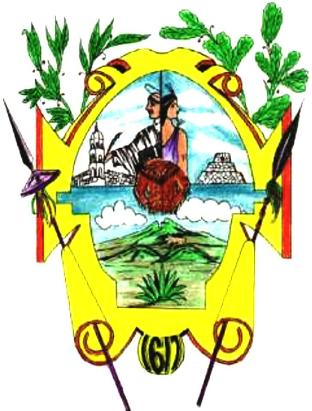
- Coat of arms

- Location in Mexico Tula (Mexico)
- Country: Mexico
- State: Tamaulipas
- Demonym: (in Spanish)
- Time zone: UTC−6 (CST)

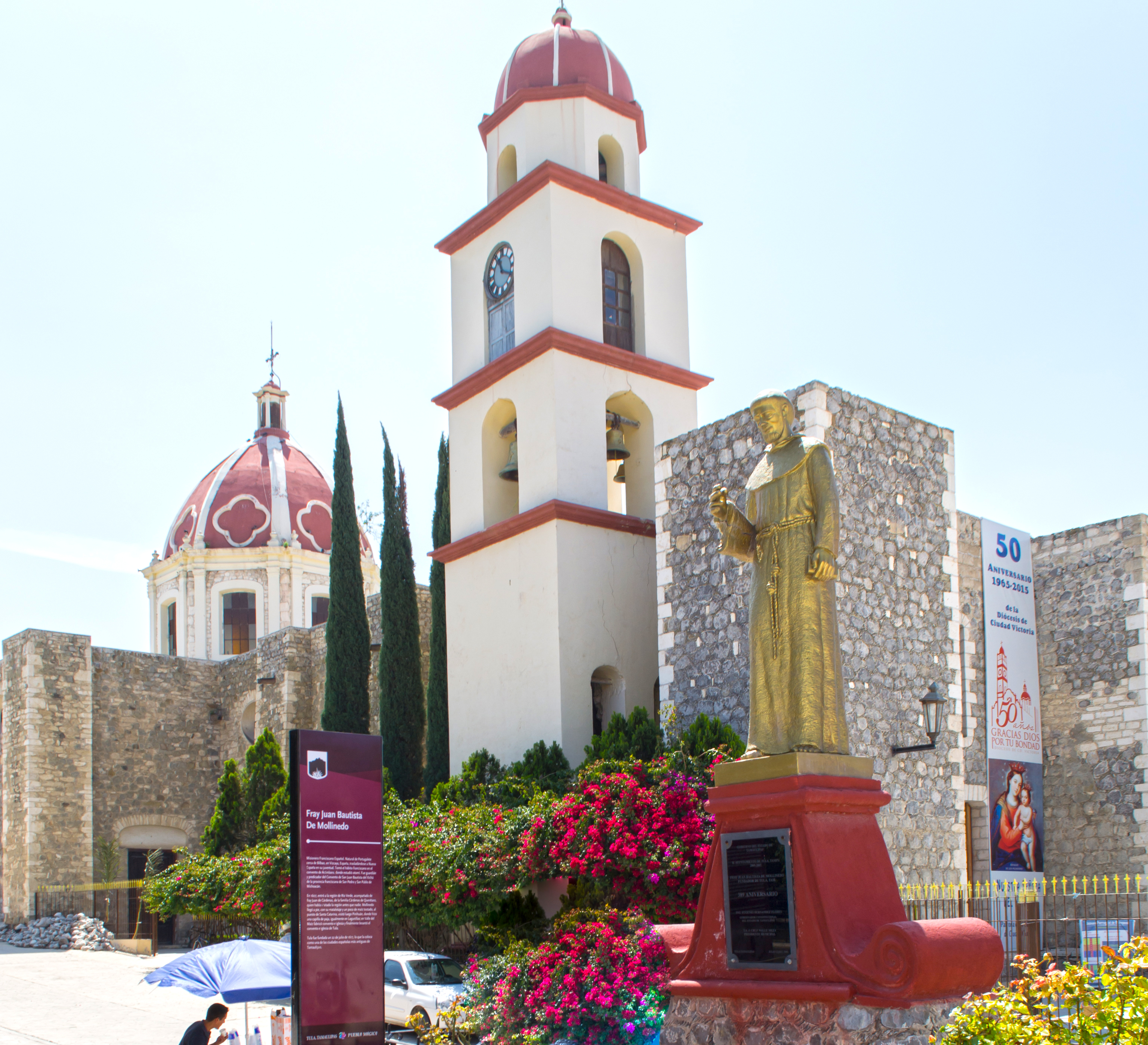
Templo de San Antonio de Padua, Tula

Tula is a town located in Tula Municipality in the Mexican state of Tamaulipas.

== History ==
The city was founded on 22 July 1617, by the Franciscan friar Juan Baptist of Mollinedo; thus, it is usually considered the oldest city in the state of Tamaulipas.

In 2011, Tula was declared a Pueblo Mágico. In August 2013, archeologists discovered 30 skeletons estimated to be about 3,000 years old. This could mean that the area of Tula was home to one of oldest genetic lineages of America.

== Geography ==
=== Climate ===
Climate data for Tula, Tamaulipas (1951–2010)
Month	Jan	Feb	Mar	Apr	May	Jun	Jul	Aug	Sep	Oct	Nov	Dec	Year
Record high °C (°F)	33.0 (91.4)	36.0 (96.8)	41.0 (105.8)	45.0 (113.0)	45.0 (113.0)	44.0 (111.2)	39.0 (102.2)	39.0 (102.2)	39.5 (103.1)	40.0 (104.0)	39.0 (102.2)	39.0 (102.2)	45.0 (113.0)
Mean daily maximum °C (°F)	21.9 (71.4)	23.8 (74.8)	27.6 (81.7)	30.3 (86.5)	32.4 (90.3)	31.3 (88.3)	29.9 (85.8)	29.7 (85.5)	29.0 (84.2)	27.5 (81.5)	25.2 (77.4)	22.7 (72.9)	27.6 (81.7)
Daily mean °C (°F)	14.6 (58.3)	16.0 (60.8)	18.9 (66.0)	21.6 (70.9)	23.9 (75.0)	24.0 (75.2)	23.1 (73.6)	22.8 (73.0)	22.2 (72.0)	20.4 (68.7)	17.7 (63.9)	15.6 (60.1)	20.1 (68.2)
Mean daily minimum °C (°F)	7.2 (45.0)	8.1 (46.6)	10.2 (50.4)	12.8 (55.0)	15.5 (59.9)	16.7 (62.1)	16.2 (61.2)	16.0 (60.8)	15.4 (59.7)	13.2 (55.8)	10.3 (50.5)	8.4 (47.1)	12.5 (54.5)
Record low °C (°F)	−6.5 (20.3)	−6.5 (20.3)	−4.0 (24.8)	1.0 (33.8)	7.0 (44.6)	0.0 (32.0)	1.0 (33.8)	5.0 (41.0)	1.0 (33.8)	2.0 (35.6)	−3.0 (26.6)	−6.0 (21.2)	−6.5 (20.3)
Average precipitation mm (inches)	11.8 (0.46)	9.5 (0.37)	9.3 (0.37)	21.4 (0.84)	36.8 (1.45)	63.1 (2.48)	78.1 (3.07)	69.0 (2.72)	68.7 (2.70)	32.5 (1.28)	11.6 (0.46)	12.0 (0.47)	423.8 (16.69)
Average precipitation days (≥ 0.1 mm)	2.0	1.4	1.3	2.8	4.8	7.2	8.5	8.2	7.7	3.9	1.6	1.7	51.1
Source: Servicio Meteorologico Nacional
