= Tula Municipality =

Coordinates: 22°00′N 99°00′W

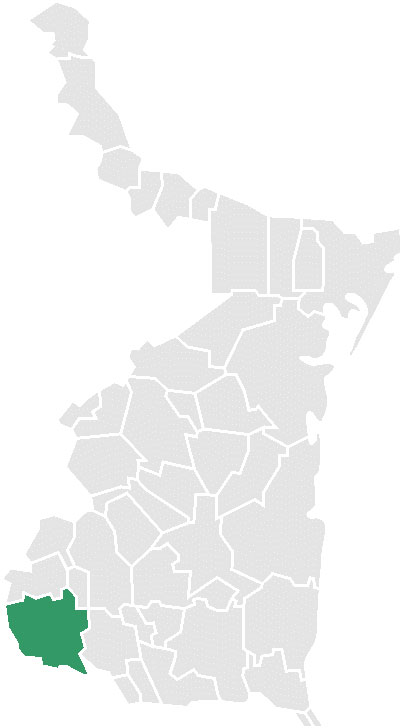

Tula Municipality is one of the municipalities in the Mexican state of Tamaulipas. The seat is at Ciudad Tula.
