= Tulsky (rural locality) =

Tulsky (Russian: Ту́льский; masculine), Tulskaya (Ту́льская; feminine), or Tulskoye (Ту́льское; neuter) is the name of several rural localities in Russia.

Modern localities

- Tulsky, Republic of Adygea, a settlement in Maykopsky District of the Republic of Adygea
- Tulsky, Saratov Oblast, a settlement in Samoylovsky District of Saratov Oblast
- Tulskoye, Krasnoyarsk Krai, a village in Borodinsky Selsoviet of Rybinsky District of Krasnoyarsk Krai
- Tulskoye, Lipetsk Oblast, a selo in Tulsky Selsoviet of Terbunsky District of Lipetsk Oblast

Historical names

- Tulskaya, name of Tulsky, Republic of Adygea, until 1963
