= Tradition und Leben =

Monarchist organisation in Germany

- Federal Republic of Germany
- Abbreviation: TuL
- Formation: 1959
- Founded at: West Germany
- Dissolved: 2022
- Type: Parliamentary monarchism
- Legal status: Monarchist Organization
- Purpose: Education on Constitutional Monarchy in Germany, Re-Instalment of the German Emperor through democracy, Re-Instalment of Germanic dynasties in the federated states of Germany
- Headquarters: Lüneburg, Lower Saxony, Germany
- Chairman: Knut Wissenbach
- Key people: Harald Schmautz
- Website: pro-monarchie.de

Tradition und Leben e.V. (TuL, lit. 'Tradition and Life"'), was a monarchist organisation in Germany. The group has campaigned for the restoration of the historical German monarchy since 1956. Their candidate for the German crown is Georg Friedrich Prinz von Preussen, head of the House of Hohenzollern, since 1994.

The group has its origins in the time shortly after World War II, when monarchists got together under the motto "Letters for Tradition und Leben." They followed partly the tradition of monarchist organisations and personalities from the time of the Weimar Republic (1919–1933), especially the Bund der Aufrechten, founded in November 1918, and partly the older German traditionalist Völkisch movement of the 19th and early 20th centuries. TuL officially registered in January 1959 in Cologne. Prior to that, a constitutional assembly took place in the autumn of 1958. Tradition und Leben provided a rallying point for all German royalists and supported all former German ruling houses.

TuL Chairman Knut Wissenbach has said that the goal of the group is to establish a parliamentary constitutional monarchy in Germany, saying "We want to put the crown on democracy." Each June, the organization's representatives are among those who lay a wreath at former Kaiser Wilhelm II's mausoleum at Huis Doorn, on the anniversary of his death. Doorn was his residence-in-exile in the Netherlands.

It dissolved in November 2022, after only a tenth of its 120 members on paper were still active.
