= Tonin =

Tonin may refer to:

== Places ==
- Tonin, Poland, a village in the administrative district of Gmina Sośno, in north-central Poland

== People ==
- Tonin (name)

== Other uses ==
- Tonin', a studio album by The Manhattan Transfer
- Tōkoyasaka Jinja tōnin gyōji, festival celebrated in Oga and Katagami, Akita Prefecture, Japan

== See also ==
- Tonie
- Tonio (name)
- Tonina (disambiguation)
- Tonon
- Tonic (disambiguation)
- Toni (disambiguation)
- Tonkin (disambiguation)
- Tonino (disambiguation)
- Toxin (disambiguation)
- Tonn (disambiguation)
- Tonia (disambiguation)
