= Latona (disambiguation) =

Latona is the Roman equivalent of Leto, a goddess in Greek mythology.

Latona may also refer to:

== Ships ==
- HMS Latona, several ships of the Royal Navy
- USS Latona (AF-35), a World War II US Navy stores ship
- Latona (ship), two merchant ships

== Places ==
- 639 Latona, an asteroid
- Latona, Illinois, United States, an unincorporated community
- Latona Township, Walsh County, North Dakota, United States
- Latona, an area that is now part of Northlake, Seattle, Washington, United States

== Other uses ==
- Latona (bivalve), a genus of bivalve molluscs in the family Donacidae
- Latona Fountain, in the gardens of the Chateau of Versailles
- Amanda Latona, a member of the American girl group Innosense
- Tim Latona, a former member of the American metalcore band Botch

== See also ==
- LaTonya, given name
