= Teona (name) =

Teona is a feminine given name.

== People with the name ==
- Teona Akubardia (born 1978), Georgian politician
- Teona Bakradze (born 1996), Georgian footballer
- Teona Bostashvili (born 1998), Georgian swimmer
- Teona Dolnikova, Russian musician
- Teona Dzhandzhgava (born 1997), Georgian gymnast
- Teona Gardapkhadze (born 1983), Georgian fashion designer
- Teona Kumsiashvili (1984–2010), Georgian poet, singer, and composer
- Teona Strugar Mitevska (born 1974), Macedonian film director and screenwriter
- Teona Sukhashvili (born 1994), Georgian football goalkeeper
- Teona Todadze (born 1993), Georgian footballer

== See also ==
- Tona (name)
- Tonia (name)
- Tonja (name)
- Tonka (name)
- Tono (name)
