= Toga (disambiguation) =

A toga is a garment worn in ancient Rome.

Toga may also refer to:

== Places ==
=== Fiji ===
- Toga District, Rewa Province
- Toga River

=== Japan ===
- Toga, Toyama, a village
  - Toga Dam
- Toga Shrine, a Shinto shrine in Toyokawa

=== United States ===
- Toga, Missouri, an unincorporated community
- Toga, Virginia, an unincorporated community

=== Elsewhere ===
- Toga (island), part of the Torres group of Vanuatu
- Toga, Spain, a municipality
- Tonga, a nation in the Pacific, whose name was officially spelt "Toga" from 1897 until 1949

== Biology and healthcare ==
- Toga virus or Hepatitis F virus
- Transoral gastroplasty, TOGA, a gastric stapling procedure
- Toga (plant), a genus of plants in the family Araceae

== Acronym ==
- Takeoff/go-around switch, used in aviation
- Tropical Ocean Global Atmosphere program, a research program in tropical meteorology

== Other uses ==
- Toga (surname), a list of people
- Academic dress, also known as a toga in some countries
- Toga language (disambiguation)
- Torra di Toga, a tower in Ville-di-Pietrabugno, Corsica
- Himiko Toga, a recurring villain in the anime and manga series My Hero Academia
- Toga, an African penguin who was stolen from the Amazon World Zoo Park, Isle of Wight, England
- Toga II, a derivative of the chess software Fruit

== See also ==
- Tola (disambiguation)
- Tonga (name)
- Tova (disambiguation)
