= Tona (name) =

Tona, Toña, Toňa and Tóna are given names. Tona is a Danish, Norwegian, Spanish and Swedish feminine given name in use in Denmark, Greenland, Sweden, Norway, Spain, parts of the United States, Mexico, Cuba, Dominican Republic, Guatemala, Honduras, El Salvador, Nicaragua, Costa Rica, Western Panama, Colombia, Venezuela, Peru, Ecuador, Bolivia, Chile, Paraguay, Argentina, Uruguay, and the Falkland Islands. The name is a short form of Antonia as well as an alternate form of Þone. Tona is also a Danish, Norwegian and Swedish feminine given name in use in Denmark, Greenland, Sweden, and Norway as a short form of Antona as well as an alternate form of Tone and Torny. Tóna is a Faroese feminine given name that is an alternate form of Tona, Tone and Torny. Toña is a Spanish feminine given name that is a short form of Antonia used in Spain, parts of the United States, Mexico, Cuba, Dominican Republic, Guatemala, Honduras, El Salvador, Nicaragua, Costa Rica, Western Panama, Colombia, Venezuela, Peru, Ecuador, Bolivia, Chile, Paraguay, Argentina, Uruguay, and the Falkland Islands. Toňa is a Czech masculine given name that is a diminutive form of Antonín used in the Czech Republic. It is also a surname. Notable people with this name include:

== Given name ==
- Tona Brown (born 1979), American violinist, mezzo-soprano and transgender woman
- Tona Rozum (born 1945), American politician
- Tona Scherchen (born 1938), Swiss composer

== Stage name ==
- Toña la Negra, stagename of Antonia del Carmen Peregrino Álvarez (1912–1982), Mexican singer and actress

== Surname ==
- Elisabetta Tona (born 1984), Italian football defender
- Rafel Tona (1903–1987), Catalan painter
- Theresa Tona (born 1991), Papua New Guinean taekwondoist

== See also ==
- Tona (disambiguation)
- Tina (given name)
- Toda (surname)
- Toga (disambiguation)
- Tola (name)
- Toma (name)
- Ton'a (1289–1372), Japanese Buddhist poet
- Ton (given name)
- Tonda (name)
- Tone (disambiguation)
- Tong (surname)
- Tonga (name)
- Toni
- Tonia (name)
- Tonja (name)
- Tonka (name)
- Tono (name)
- Tonra
- Tõnu
- Tony (name)
- Tonya (given name)
- Tora (given name)
- Tora (surname)
- Tova
- Tuna (name)
- Teona (name)
