= Tonje =

- Gender: Female

Origin
- Origin: Norwegian
- Meaning: thunder + new
- Region of origin: Norway

Other names
- Related names: Tone

Tonje is a Danish, Norwegian and Swedish feminine given name that originated from Old Norse as a short form of Antona and a variant of Torny that is in use in Denmark, Greenland, Norway and Sweden.

== Origin ==
It has several origins:

- Norwegian dialectal variant form of Tone and Torny
- Short form of Antonie (Tonja)

== Notable people ==
- Tonje Angelsen (born 1990), Norwegian high jumper
- Tonje Berglie (born 1992), Norwegian handball player
- Tonje Enkerud (born 1994), Norwegian handball player
- Tonje Hessen Schei (born 1971), Norwegian film director, producer and screenwriter.
- Tonje Kjærgaard (born 1975), Danish handball player
- Tonje Kristiansen (born 1967), Norwegian sailor
- Tonje Larsen (born 1975), Norwegian handball player
- Tonje Løseth (born 1991), Norwegian handball player
- Tonje Haug Lerstad (born 1996), Norwegian handball player
- Tonje Nøstvold (born 1985), Norwegian handball player
- Tonje Lavik Pederssen (born 1996), Norwegian politician
- Tonje Sagstuen (born 1971), Norwegian handball player
- Tonje Strøm (1937 – 2010), Norwegian painter and illustrator

== See also ==
- Tonja (name)
- Tonya (name)
- Tonia (name)
- Tonie (name)
- Tania (name)
- Tanja (name)
- Tanya (name)
- Tonye
