= Toner (surname) =

Toner is a surname in English and Turkish. In English, it is an anglicisation of the Gaelic name Ó Tomhrair, meaning a "descendant of Tomhrar". Notable people with the surname include:

- Cole Toner (born 1994), American football player
- Devin Toner (born 1986), Ireland rugby union international
- Fionnuala Toner (born 1990), Northern Ireland netball international
- Helen Toner (born 1992), Australian researcher
- Imogen Toner (born 1983), British actress and artist
- James J. Toner (born 1940), American racehorse trainer
- John Toner (bishop) (1857–1949), Scottish clergy man
- John Toner (American football) (1923–2014), American football player, coach
- John Toner (physicist) (born 1955), American physicist
- Máire Toner (born 1992), Northern Ireland netball international
- Mark A. Toner (born 1960), Australian artist and psychologist
- Mehmet Toner (born 1958), Turkish biomedical engineer
- Michael E. Toner (born 1964), American lawyer
- Michael Toner (born 1944), British journalist
- Niall Toner (born 1944), Irish musician and radio broadcaster
- Pauline Toner (1935–1989), Australian politician
- Robin Toner (1954–2008), American journalist
- Tom Toner (1950–1990), American football player
- Robert E. Toner, III (born 1972), Family Medicine Physician Associate

== See ==
- Toner (disambiguation)
- Toney (name)
- John Toner (disambiguation)
