= Tonia (name) =

Tonia is an Italian and Spanish feminine given name that is a diminutive form of Antonia as a feminine form of Tonino and Tonio that is used in Italy, Spain, parts of the United States, Mexico, Cuba, Dominican Republic, Guatemala, Honduras, El Salvador, Nicaragua, Costa Rica, Western Panama, Colombia, Venezuela, Peru, Ecuador, Bolivia, Chile, Paraguay, Argentina, Uruguay, and the Falkland Islands. It is also a variant of Tonja, Tonya, Tanya, Tanja, Tania. Variants of the name Tonia include LaTonia, LaTonya, and LaTanya.

== Mononym ==
- Tonia (singer) (born 1947 as Arlette Antoine Dominicus) Belgian singer

== Given name ==
- Tonia Buxton, Greek-Cypriot TV personality
- Tonia Couch (born 1989), British diver
- Tonia Kwiatkowski (born 1971) U.S. figure skater
- Tonia Marketaki (1942-1994; Greek: Τώνια Μαρκετάκη) Greek director
- Tonia Sotiropoulou (born 1987 as Greek: Τόνια Σωτηροπούλου) Greek actress
- Tonia Svaier (born 1968), Greek rower
- Tonia Tisdell (born 1992) Liberian soccer player
- Tonia Todman (born 1948) Australian TV personality
- Tonia Maria Zindel (born 1972), Swiss actress
- Tonia Stieltjes (1881–1932), Dutch model, activist, and trade unionist

== Nickname ==
- Tonia Antoniazzi, nickname of Antonia Louise Antoniazzi, (born 1971) UK politician
- Tônia Carrero, nickname of Maria Antonieta Portocarrero Thedi, (1922–2018) Brazilian actress

== Biological name ==
- Teladoma tonia (T. tonia) a moth species

== See also ==
- Tonia (disambiguation)
- Latonia (disambiguation)
- Antonia (name)
- Tona (name)
- Tonda (name)
- Tonja (name)
- Tonya (name)
- Tanya (name)
- Tanja (name)
- Tania (name)
- Tonja (name)
- Tonka (name)
- Tonie (name)
- Tonin (name)
- Tonio (name)
- Tonita (name)
- Tonje, name
- Tosia, name
- Tonic Chabalala
