= Tonina (name) =

Tonino
- Gender: Female
- Language: Italian

Origin
- Region of origin: Italy

Other names
- Related names: Antonia (name), Tonino (given name)

Tonina is an Italian feminine given name that is a diminutive form of Antonia and the feminine form of Tonino that is used in Italy. Notable people with this name include the following:

== People ==
- Tonina Dimech, Maltese footballer for First Division club Birkirkara FC
- Tonina Jackson, primary ring name for Héctor Garza Lozano Vela (1917 – 1969), Mexican actor and professional wrestler also known as Héctor Lozano, Gordo Lozano and Pancho Morales
- Tonina Torrielli (born 1934), Italian singer

== See also ==
- Tonina (disambiguation)
- Tonia (name)
- Tonin (name)
- Tonita (name)
