= Tania (disambiguation) =

Tania is a female given name.

Tania may also refer to:

== People ==
For persons known mononymously as such:

- Tania (actress) (born 1993), Indian actress
- Tania (artist), American sculptor
- Tania (tango singer), Spanish tango singer
- Tania (queen), Persian nobility

== Songs ==
- "Tania," a song by Camper Van Beethoven from their album Our Beloved Revolutionary Sweetheart
- "Tania", a song by John Rowles
- "Tania", a song by Julie Ruin from her album Julie Ruin

== Other uses ==
- La Tania, Savoie, France; a ski resort
- Tania (fungus), a genus of dot lichen

== See also ==
- Tania Borealis, a star in the constellation Ursa Major
- Tania Australis, a star in the constellation Ursa Major
- Tanja (disambiguation)
- Tanya (disambiguation)
- Tonya (disambiguation)
- Tonia (disambiguation)
