= Tanya =

Tanya may refer to:

== People ==
- Tanya (name), a feminine given name

== Film ==
- Tanya (1940 film), a Soviet musical comedy by Grigori Aleksandrov
- Tanya (1976 film), a low-budget American comedy

== Music ==
- "Tanya", a composition by Donald Byrd, on Dexter Gordon's album One Flight Up
- Tanya (album), a 2002 album by Tanya Tucker

== Other uses ==
- 2127 Tanya, an asteroid
- Hurricane Tanya, a storm in the 1995 Atlantic hurricane season
- Tanya (horse) (1902–1929), the winner of the 1905 Belmont Stakes horse race
- Tanya (Judaism), an early work of Hasidic philosophy by Rabbi Shneur Zalman of Liadi

== See also ==
- Tania (disambiguation)
- Tanja (disambiguation)
- Tonia (disambiguation)
- Tonya (disambiguation)
