= Ó Tomhrair =

- Ó Tomhrair in a Gaelic type. The lenited m in the name (mh) once appeared in Irish orthography with a dot above it.
- Gender: Masculine
- Language: Irish

Other gender
- Feminine: Ní Thomhrair, Bean Uí Thomhrair, Uí Thomhrair

Origin
- Language: Irish
- Meaning: "descendant of Tomhrar"

Other names
- Variant forms: Ó Tomhnair, Ó Tomhnra
- Anglicisation: Toner

Ó Tomhrair is a masculine surname in the Irish language. The name translates into English as "descendant of Tomhrar". The surname originated as a patronym, however it no longer refers to the actual name of the bearer's grandfather. There are several variations of the surname, such as Ó Tomhnair and Ó Tomhnra. There are specific forms of these surnames that are borne by married and unmarried females. There are also numerous anglicised forms of these Irish surnames.

== Etymology ==
Ó Tomhrair translates into English as "descendant of Tomhrar". Variant forms of the surname include Ó Tomhnair and Ó Tomhnra. According to Patrick Woulfe, the form Ó Tomhnair is the older form of the name. These surnames originated as patronyms, however they no longer refer to the actual name of the bearer's grandfather. The name Tomhrar is a Gaelic derivative of the Old Norse personal name Þórarr.

== Feminine forms ==
Ó Tomhrair, Ó Tomhnair, and Ó Tomhnra are a masculine surnames. The forms of this surname for unmarried females is Ní Thomhrair, Ní Thomhnair, and Ní Thomhnra; these three names translate into English as "daughter of the descendant of Tomhrar". The forms of these surnames for married females is Bean Uí Thomhrair, Bean Uí Thomhnair, and Bean Uí Thomhnra; or simply Uí Thomhrair, Uí Thomhnair, and Uí Thomhnra; these six surnames translate to "wife of the descendant of Tomhrar".

== Anglicised forms ==
The surnames Ó Tomhrair and Ó Tomhnair have historically been anglicised variously as Toner; Woulfe, who wrote in the early 20th century, noted that the surname was then common in Ulster. The surname Ó Tomhnra has been anglicised as Tonra, and Tonry; Woulfe noted that the surnames were found in County Sligo and County Mayo, but were rare there. Extant variants also include Tonery, Tonrey, and Tonroy. Tomroy may be an extinct variant.

== Families ==
A family who bore the surnames Ó Tomhrair and Ó Tomhnair were a branch of Cinel Eoghain, and were historically seated near Lough Swilly, in County Donegal. This family built a church called Cill Ó dTomhrair, which is now Anglicised as Killodonnell.
