= Tanja (disambiguation) =

Tanja is a female given name

Tanja may also refer to:

- Alternate name for Tangier, a Moroccan city
- Alternate transliteration for danja (단자; 團餈), a Korean rice cake
- Tanja Liedtke Foundation, German-based charity supporting modern and contemporary dance
- Tanja (TV series), a 39-piece German ARD Art Series by Berengar Pfahl
- Tanja sail, also known as the tilted square sail, used by native Austronesian ships in maritime Southeast Asia

== See also ==
- Tania (disambiguation)
- Tanya (disambiguation)
- Tonja (name)
- Tonya (disambiguation)
- Tonia (disambiguation)
