= Tania =

Tania is usually a given name. It may refer to:

== Given name ==
- Tania Álvarez (born 1994), Spanish marathon canoeist
- Tania Alvarez (born 2002), Spanish professional boxer
- Tânia Alves (born 1953), Brazilian actress and singer
- Tania Bambaci (born 1990), Italian actress
- Tania Belvederesi (born 1978), Italian cyclist
- Tania Brishty, Bangladesh actress and model
- Tania Cagnotto (born 1985), Italian diver
- Tania Marie Caringi (1986–2025), Italian-American model
- Princess Tania de Bourbon Parme (born 1961), French designer
- Tania de Jong (born 1964), Dutch-born Australian soprano and entrepreneur
- Tania Detomas (born 1985), Italian snowboarder
- Tania Di Mario (born 1979), Italian water polo player
- Tania Emery (born 1976), British actress
- Tania Fernández (canoeist) (born 1992), Spanish marathon canoeist
- Tania Franco Klein (born 1990), Mexican artist
- Tania Gunadi (born 1983), Indonesian-born actress
- Tania Halse, South African politician
- Tania Khalill (born 1977), Brazilian actress
- Tania Lacy (born 1965), Australian comedian
- Tania Libertad (born 1952), Peruvian singer
- Tania Lineham (1966–2018), New Zealand science teacher
- Tania Mak (born 1986), Chinese triathlete
- Tania Mallet (1941–2019), English actress and model
- Tânia Mara (born 1983), Brazilian singer and actress
- Tânia Mara Fassoni-Giansante (born 1956), Brazilian sports shooter
- Tânia Maranhão (born 1974), Brazilian footballer
- Tânia Maria (born 1947), Brazilian actress, artisan and seamstress
- Tania Maria (born 1948), Brazilian artist, singer, composer, bandleader and piano player
- Tânia Martins (born 1957), Brazilian poet
- Tania Mathias (born 1964), British ophthalmologist and politician
- Tania Mihailuk (born 1976), Australian politician
- Tania Navarro Amo (born 1956), Spanish writer, LGBTQ activist
- Tania Nehme (born 1966), Australian film editor
- Tania Ramos González (born 1971), Puerto Rican author and academic
- Tania Raymonde (born 1988), American actress
- Tânia Rodrigues (1950–2026), Brazilian politician
- Tania Roxborogh (born 1965), New Zealand author
- Tania Sachdev (born 1986), Indian chess player
- Tania Vincenzino (born 1986), Italian long jumper
- Tania Zaetta (born 1970), Australian Bollywood actress

== Single name ==
- Tania (tango singer) (1893-1999), Spanish tango singer
- Tania (artist) (1920-1982), Polish-born Jewish American artist
- Tania (actress) (born 1993), Indo-Canadian actress and model
- Tamara Bunke a.k.a. "Tania" or "Tania the Guerrillera" (1937–1967), Argentine-born East German Communist revolutionary who died alongside Che Guevara
- Patty Hearst (born 1954), American actress who took the alias "Tania" in honor of Tamara Bunke

== Fictional characters ==
- Tania, a fictional character in The Faerie Path
- Tania, a fictional character in Tropic of Cancer

== Astronomy ==
- Tania Borealis and Tania Australis, a pair of stars in Ursa Major

== See also ==
- -tania
- Tanja (name)
- Tanya (name)
- Tonya (name)
- Tonje (name)
- Tonja (name)
- Tonia (name)
