= Tonya =

Tonya may refer to:

- Tonya (name), the given name, and people by that name
- Tonya, Turkey, a town and district of Trabzon Province in the Black Sea region of Turkey
- Tonya, Uganda
- Ton'ya (問屋) trade brokers of ancient Japan

== See also ==
- I, Tonya (2017 film) film about Tonya Harding
- Hoima–Kaiso–Tonya Road in Uganda
- Tanya (disambiguation)
- Tania (disambiguation)
- Tanja (disambiguation)
- Tonia (disambiguation)
