= Tona =

Tona may refer to:

- Tona, Bangladesh, village in India
- Tona, Spain, municipality in the province of Barcelona, Catalonia, Spain
- Tona, Santander, municipality in Santander, Colombia
- Tona (beer), Nicaragua, Beer
- Tona (name)
- Tona, Katsuura, Chiba, Japan, a neighborhood of Katsuura City in which Katsuura Station is located
- Ton'a, Japanese poet
- Titles of Nobility amendment, a proposed US constitutional amendment
