= Tonye =

Tonye is a given name and a surname. It is a feminine given name variant of the French and Latin Antoinette. As a surname, it is most prevalent in Cameroon. Tamunotonye and its shortened version Tonye are Ijaw unisex given names that are prominent in Nigeria where it is most commonly used among the Kalabari, Okrika, and Nembe people of Rivers State, Bayelsa State, and Delta State. The name translates to English as "God's will", "God's desire", "favor from God", or "God's plan".

== Given name ==
- Tonye Briggs-Oniyide, Nigerian businessperson and politician
- Tonye Cole (born 1967), Nigerian businessman
- Tonye Garrick (born 1983), British-born Nigerian singer
- Tonye Ibiama (born 1974), Nigerian businessman
- Tonye Jekiri (born 1994), Nigerian basketball player
- Tonye Patano (born 1961), American actress
- Tonye Princewill (born 1969), British-born Nigerian politician

== Middle name ==
- Alabo Tonye Graham-Douglas, known as Alabo Graham-Douglas (1939–2022), Nigerian politician
- Dale Antou Tonye Ian Virgo, known as Dale Dizzle Virgo or simply Dizzle (born 1985), Jamaican record producer, musician, engineer and an entrepreneur

== Surname ==
- Isaie Tonye (born 1951), Cameroonian wrestler
- Herve Tonye-Tonye (born 1988), Canadian gridiron football player

== See also ==
- Tone (name)
- Toney (name)
- Tonge (surname)
- Tonie
- Tonje
- Tonne (name)
- Tony (given name)
- Tonya (given name)
- Tonyee Chow
