= Latona (ship) =

A number of vessels have been named Latona for the Greco-Roman goddess Leto:

- Latona (1786 ship) was launched at Newcastle. She served in the Baltic timber trade. A French privateer captured her in 1800, but she was immediately recaptured. She was last listed in 1835. Possibly wrecked in 1835.
- Latona (1789 ship) was launched at Whitby. She made one voyage for the British East India Company (EIC) in (1794-1795), and one whaling voyage in 1818–1820. She was wrecked in 1841.

== See also ==
- HMS Latona - one of four vessels by that name that served in the British Royal Navy
- USS Latona (AF-35)
