= Westbeth Playwrights Feminist Collective =

Group of professional women playwrights

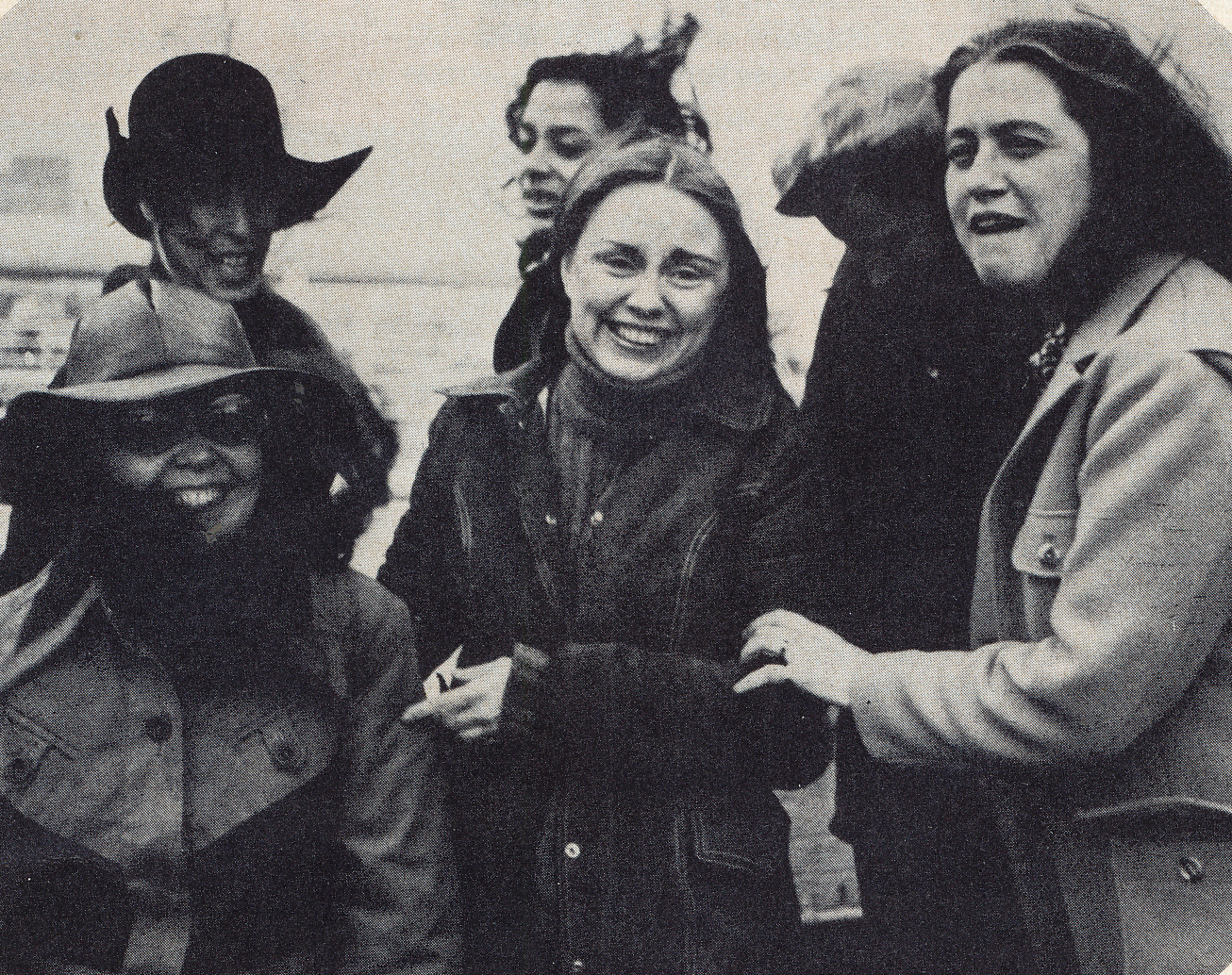
Westbeth Playwrights Feminist Collective 1971 (L-r) Sally Ordway, Susan Yankowitz, Christina (Chryse) Maile, Gwen Gunn, Patricia Horan, Dolores Walker in center. Photo: Sondra Lowell

The Westbeth Playwrights Feminist Collective was a group of professional women playwrights in New York active from 1971 to 1975. They wrote and produced feminist plays and were one of the first feminist theatre groups in the United States. The members' individual works had been produced at the Public Theater, La Mama, Joe Chaikin’s Open Theater, Caffe Cino, Circle Repertory Company, Mark Taper Forum, Lincoln Center, and New York Theater Ensemble.

== History ==
The playwrights' group was one of the first feminist theatre groups in the US. Original members included Helen Duberstein, Helene Dworzan, Patricia Horan, Gwen Gunn, Christina Maile, Sally Ordway, Dolores Deane Walker, and Susan Yankowitz. Megan Terry and Dacia Maraini were among the guest playwrights.

Their Advisory Board included Gloria Steinem, Muriel Rukeyser, Eleanor Perry, Florynce Kennedy, along with Margaret Croyden, Alice Denham, Elizabeth Fisher, Ellen Frankfort, Carol Greitzer, Tania, Alix Kates Shulman, and Anita Steckel.

== Feminist issues ==
The plays of the Westbeth Playwrights Feminist Collective featured such women's issues as religious patriarchy, work-place discrimination, dominance/submission relationships, historical figures, masquerade, and sexual harassment.

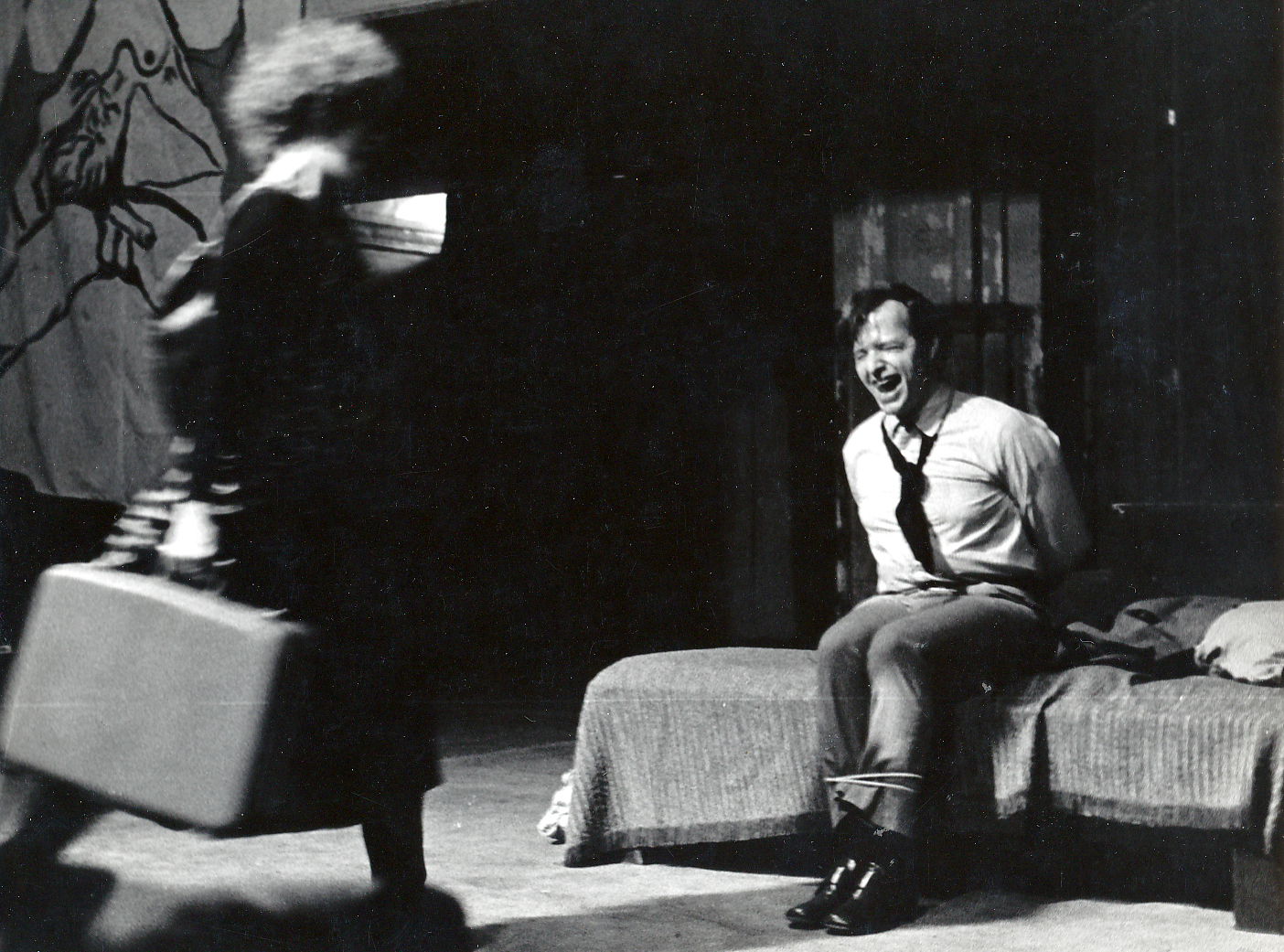
Rape-In showing scene from Liberation by Dolores Walker. Backdrop by Eunice Golden. Actors: Helen Pugatch, David Kent. 1971. Photo by Paul Lubitz

Subsequent to their first production, RAPE-IN, the plays transcended the limiting context of agit-prop theatre by discarding the revenge themes current in much feminist writing at the time, and instead strove to accurately reflect the complexity of women’s lives and celebrate their accomplishments.

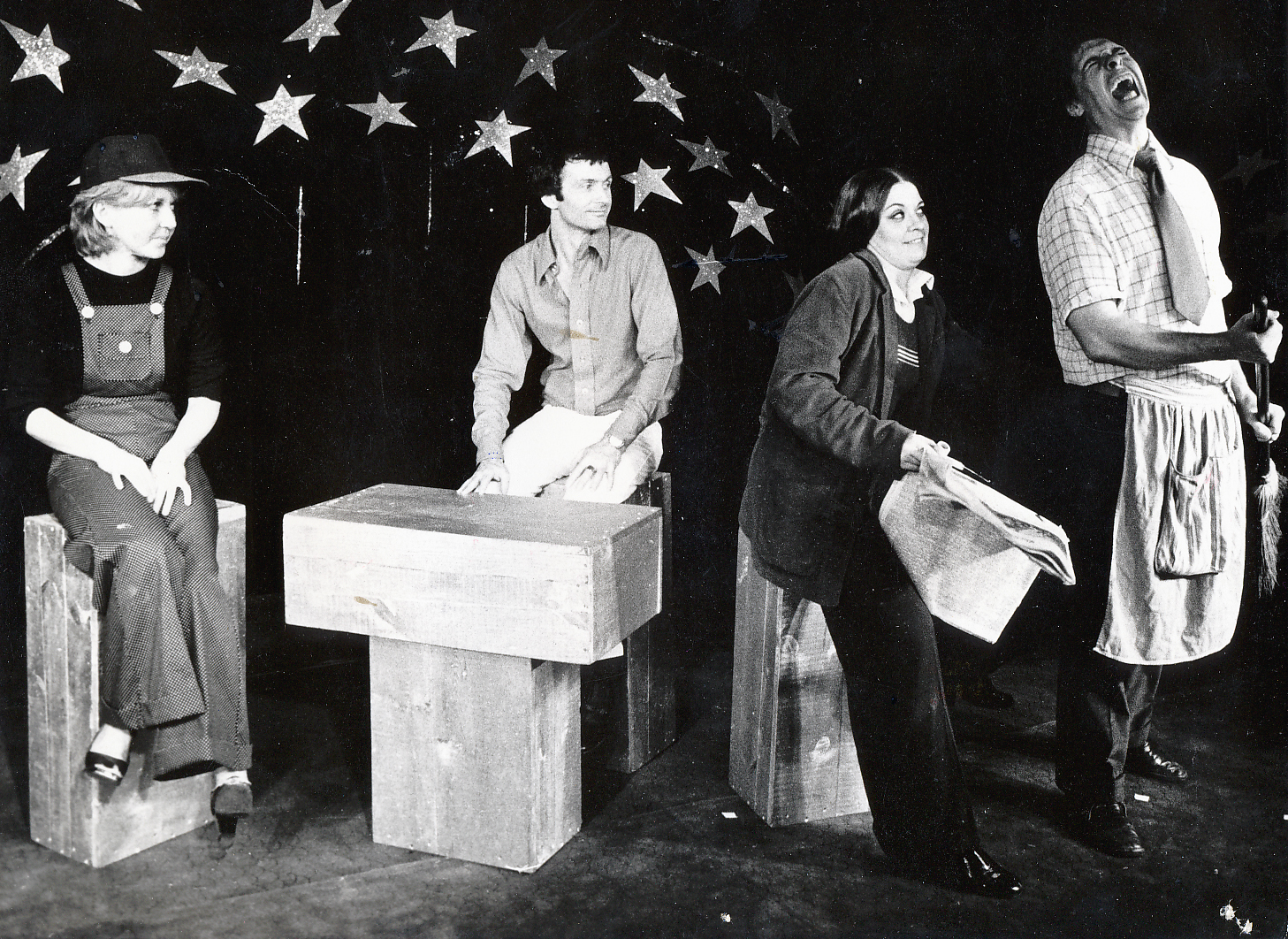
?! A Musical Revue showing scene from Trading Places by Sally Ordway. Actors (l-r) Kristen Christopher, Richard Darrow, Lois Beckett, Norman Thomas Marshall. 1973 Photo by Cookie Cirillo

The company was especially noteworthy for writing about women's issues with lacerating humor in often absurdist situations. Christopher Olsen in his book, Off Off Broadway 1968 -1970 The Second Wave (2011), noted the playwrights’ abilities to balance a serious social message about the marginalization of women with a sense of humor and a commitment to good writing. Linda Killian, in analyzing the group’s first production, RAPE-IN, wrote that they “used humor, anger, and horror, sometimes in combination, sometimes alone.

Kevin Sanders, in his 1973 WABC Eyewitness News review of WICKED WOMEN stated: “Their two earlier highly successful shows, RAPE-IN and UP!–AN UPPITY REVUE! were sharp, perceptive and fiercely satirical representations of a contemporary feminist viewpoint – a tradition maintained in this new show [Wicked Women]." Gloria Rojas of WNEW-TV Midday Live, New York agreed: “Wicked Women is outrageous, funny and, to me, a little shocking.”

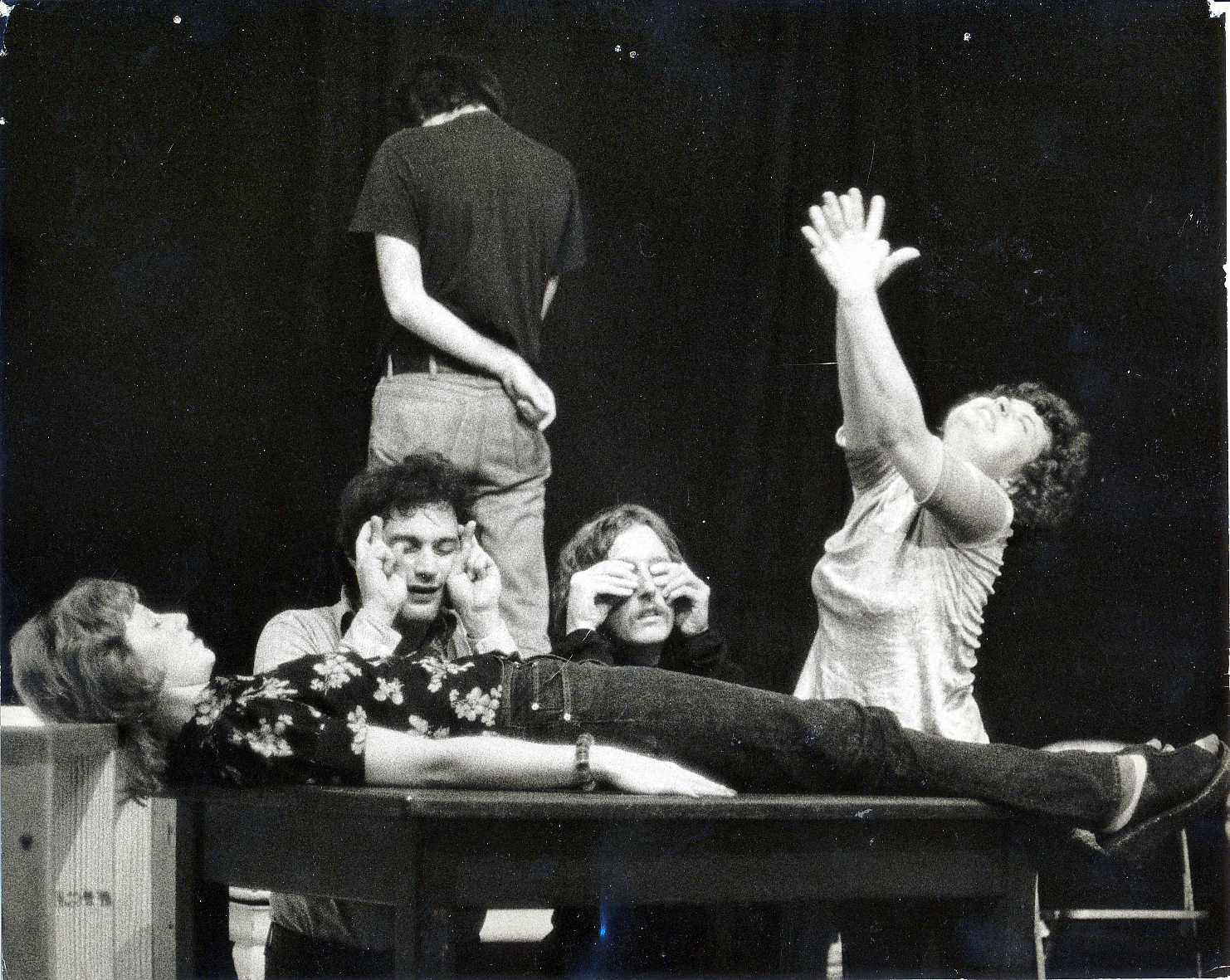
Wicked Women Revue showing scene from Franklin's Bride by Chryse (Christina) Maile. Actors: (l-r) Helen Pugatch, Michael Darrow, Joel Simon, Tom Leo, Alix Elias. 1973. Photo by Patricia Horan

The group’s productions were widely and positively reviewed, and, with its theatrical emphasis, it became one of the first feminist theater groups reviewed in the New York Times on an ongoing basis. Howard Thompson in his NY Times review called the Collective's productions, "witty and original.". Mel Gussow said that the Collective's productions work both as "a course in consciousness raising and a call to arms." Debbie Wasserman in her Show Business review of The Wicked Women Revue noted, “It is certainly a pleasure to see a crusading group which doesn’t use its crusade as an excuse for bad theatre, but rather uses good theatre to assist its crusade.”

== Job opportunities ==
Because it was specifically a women's playwrights’ and producing group, the Collective hired professional actors, and group members did not perform.

While the Collective used both male and female actors - unusual for feminist stage productions in the 1970s – the company offered serious employment opportunities for women stage managers, directors, producers, and lighting designers. Many women currently working in theatre credit the Collective for giving them their first real job experience in theater. All productions featured original songs composed and performed by women musicians. The playwrights strongly believed in collective creation among women and operated a separate theater workshop to explore new works.

== Other work ==
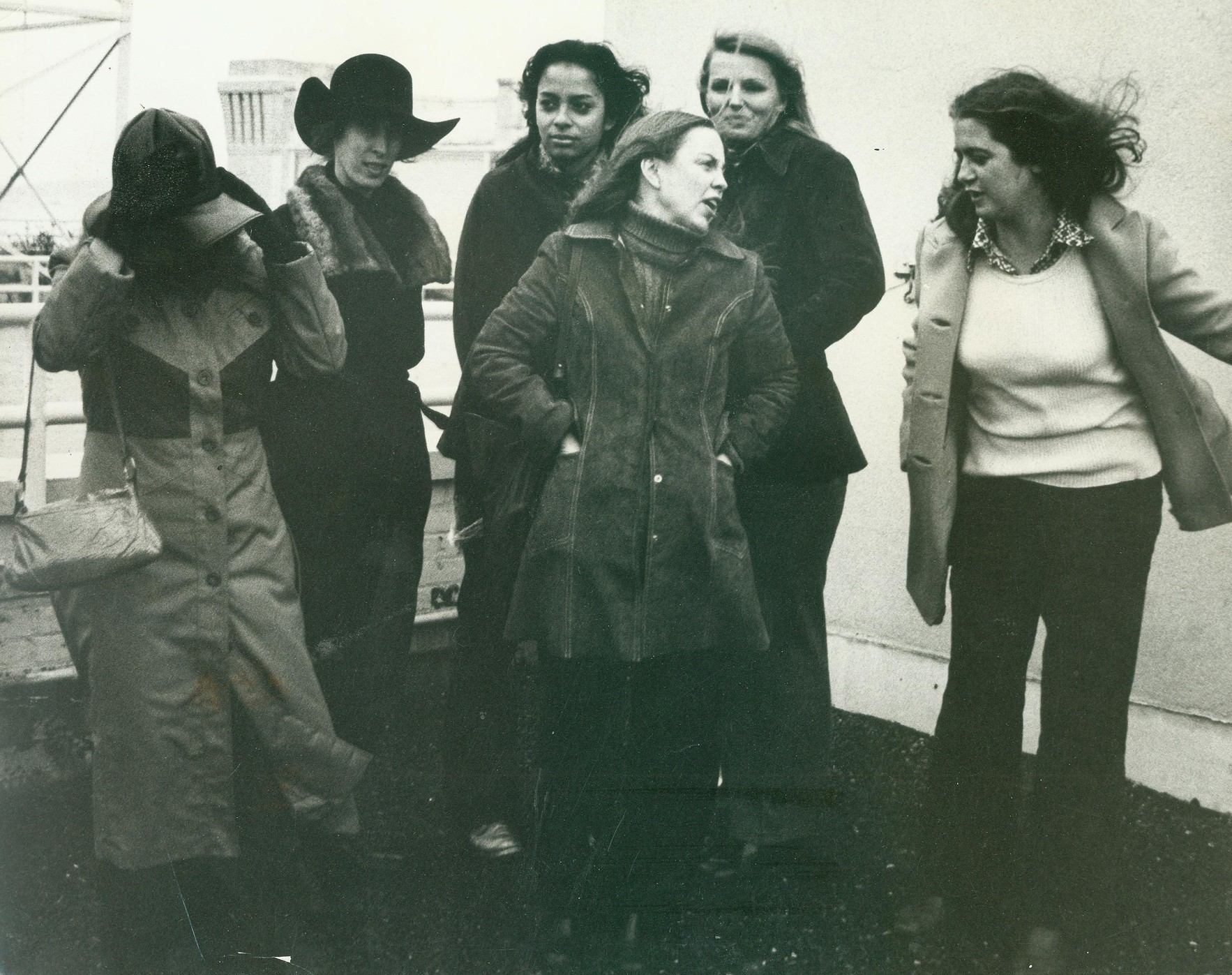
Westbeth Playwrights Feminist Collective on roof of Westbeth in NYC, 1971. From l-r Sally Ordway, Susan Yankowitz, Christina (Chryse) Maile, Dolores Walker (in front) Gwen Gunn, and Patricia Horan. Photo by Lucille Rhodes

Not limited to theater productions, the playwrights group branched out to produce poetry readings, and film screenings. As a preamble to the opening of JUMPIN’ SALTY - a show about historic women in Greenwich Village – they organized a march through downtown Manhattan complete with speakers at numerous historic sites. These included the site of the Triangle Shirtwaist Factory fire, Margaret Sanger’s office, and Henrietta Rodman's Feminist Alliance office at McDougal St., the former Café Society location at Sheridan Square where Lena Horne sang, Bessie Hillman's Women's Trade Union League, and a location of Harriet Tubman's Underground Railroad. In 1974-75, the Collective sponsored a nationwide playwriting contest for women playwrights. The prize was a theatrical production in New York City.

As the work of the group grew, so did its administrative needs. At any one time, the Advisory Board of the Westbeth Playwrights Feminist Collective was filled with women dedicated to good writing who were concerned with women's issues. These included Margaret Croyden, author; Alice Denham, author; Elizabeth Fisher, author and founder of Aphra Feminist Literary Journal; Ellen Frankfort, author and journalist; Carol Greitzer, New York City Councilwoman; Florynce Kennedy, women’s rights activist and civil rights lawyer; Eleanor Perry, screenwriter; Muriel Rukeyser, poet; Alix Kates Shulman, author; Anita Steckel, artist; Tania, artist; and Gloria Steinem, author and founder of Ms. Magazine.

In May, 1974, the Collective hired Nancy Rhodes as Administrative Director. Subsequently she founded the Encompass New Opera Theatre and has continued for the past thirty years as Artistic Director of that opera company.

The Westbeth Playwrights Feminist Collective, was partially funded as a not-for-profit theater company by the National Endowment for the Arts and the New York State Council on the Arts.

The name of the group is derived from Westbeth Artists Housing – an affordable housing complex for artists in New York City, where most of the playwrights lived and worked, and which made accessible to the Collective free rehearsal space, and sometimes, production space.

Rape-In, the playwrights’ first show, began as a workshop project at the suggestion of a male playwright in a then-mixed Westbeth playwrights' group. But it was the women who wrote on the theme, and when they did, they discovered they were all feminists.

== Productions and events ==
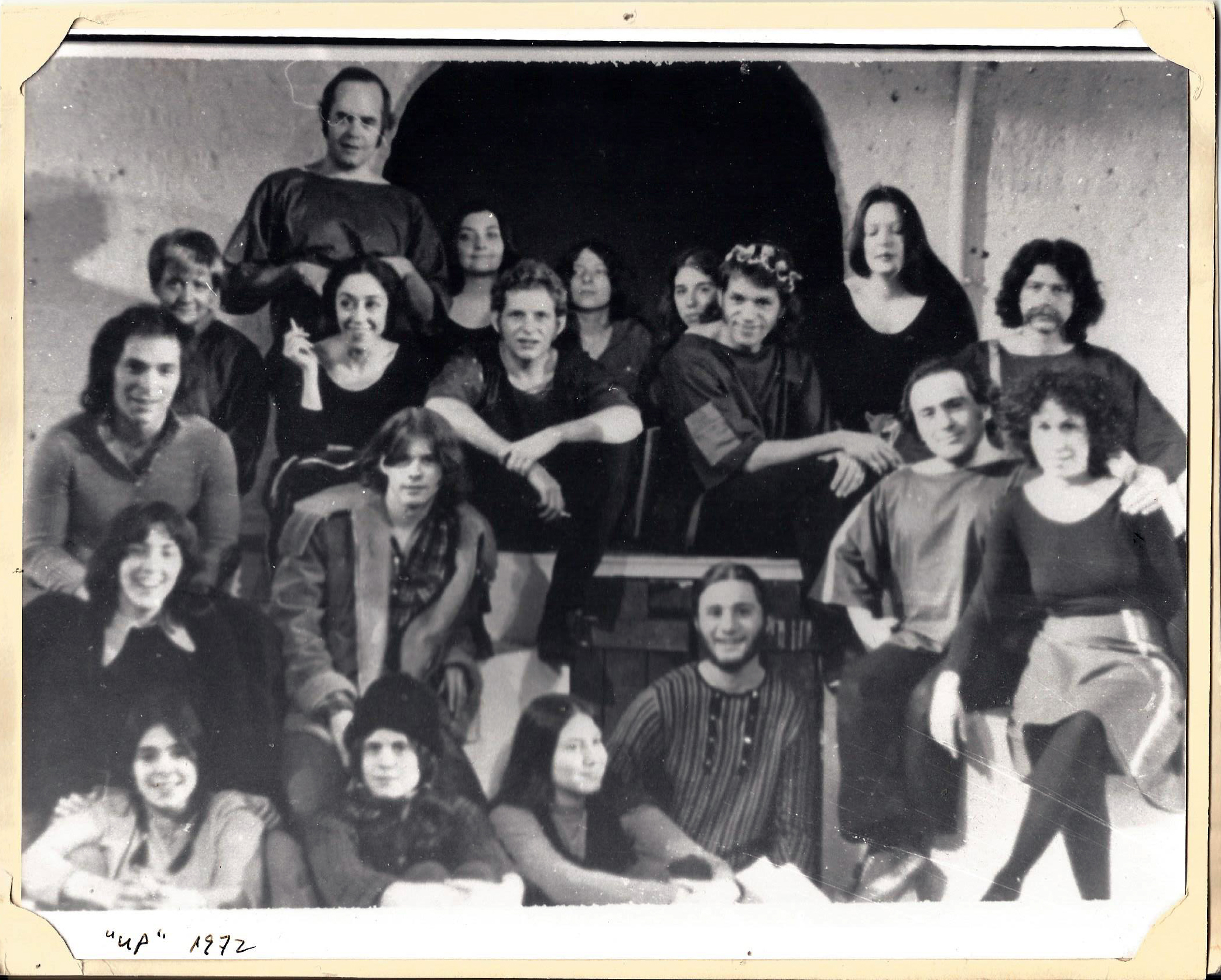
Up Production Photo with Danny DeVito, Rhea Perlman, Cathy Heriza, and others Photo by Arcaterra

- May, 1971: Rape-In - produced at Crystal Field’s Assembly Theatre (later known as Theatre for the New City)
  - Playwrights: Helen Duberstein, Helene Dworzan, Gwen Gunn, Patricia Horan, Ruth Herschberger, Christina Maile, Sally Ordway, Dolores Deane Walker
- February, 1972: Up - An Uppity Revue - produced at Westbeth Cabaret
  - Playwrights: Gwen Gunn, Patricia Horan, Christina Maile, Sally Ordway, A. Piotrowski, Dolores Deane Walker, Susan Yankowitz
  - Director: Marjorie Melnick
  - Music and Lyrics: Cathy Heriza
  - Cast: Danny DeVito. Rhea Perlman, Tom Fenaughty, R Douglas Friedlander, Eileen Gottermeyer, Leigh Hagen, Ilan Mamber, J H Murphy, Saul Fredericks, Cleve Roller, Faith Stanflied
- January, 1973: Wicked Women Revue – Produced at Theatre for New City (earlier previews at Rhett and Robert Delford Brown’s The Great Building Crackup Gallery)
  - Playwrights: Gwen Gunn, Patricia Horan, Christina (Chryse) Maile, Dacia Maraini, Sally Ordway, Dolores Deane Walker, Susan Yankowitz
  - Director: Kim Friedman
  - Cast: Alix Elias, Tom Leo, Melissa Zollo, Helen Pugatch, Kathleen Tolan, Michael Darrow, Joel Simon
- May, 1973: ?! – A Musical Revue - Produced at Joseph Jefferson Company
  - Playwrights: Gwen Gunn, Patricia Horan, Christina (Chryse) Maile, Sally Ordway, A. Piotrowski, Dolores Deane Walker, Susan Yankowitz.
  - Director: Cathy Roskam
  - Cast: Lois Beckett, Jane Burch, Kristen Christopher, Richard Darrow, Norman Thomas Marshall, William Perley
  - Other support: Music: Sandy Alpert. Lighting Design: Claire Carter. Choreography: Rose Graziano, Sets: Christina Maile, Costumes: Walter McCord. Stage Manager: Rose Graziano. Musical Directors: Sandy Alpert, Mari Foss. Musicians: Cookie Cirillo, Mari Foss, Sally Hilbert, Cathy Roskam.
- January, 1974: We Can Feed Everybody Here - Westbeth Cabaret
  - Playwrights: Gwen Gunn, Patricia Horan, Christina Maile, Sally Ordway, A. Piotrowski, Megan Terry, Dolores Deane Walker
  - Director: Marjorie Melnick
- May, 1974: Westbeth Playwrights Feminist Collective Benefit
  - Women’s Bands! Women’s songs! Women Comedians! Women Bartenders! Items contributed for auction by Rhett Brown (producer), Shirley Clarke (filmmaker), Noma Copley (jewelry artist and sculptor), Rosalyn Drexler (artist, writer), Eleanor Perry, Muriel Rukeyser (poet), Anita Steckel (artist), and writers and playwrights, Margaret Croyden, Irene Fornes, Erica Jong, Myna Lamb, Ellen Frankfort, and MS Magazine.
- May, 1974: What Time of Night It Is – Gallery Theater at Westbeth
  - Playwrights: Patricia Horan, Marjorie DeFazio
  - Director: Marjorie DeFazio
  - Other support: Lyrics: Patricia Horan and Marjorie DeFazio. Music: Sandy Alpert, Nell Carter, Cookie Cirillo. Additional Lyrics: Harriet Robinson and L Mae Wheeler
  - Associate Producer: Nancy Rhodes
  - Cast: Fran Anthony, Mary Ellen Ashley, Cookie Cirillo, Joanne Dondera, Sheila Gibbs, Birdie M Hale, Peter Johnl, Joan Nelson, Penelope Willis
  - Other support: Music Director: Nell Carter. Asst Music Director: Cookie Cirillo. Choreography: Katerine Parks. Stage Manager: Rose Graziano. Lighting: Denise Ford. Sets: Jean Warfield. Costumes: Mary White. Electrician: Josephine Steinway. Special Thanks to Jacqueline Ceballos and Brian Jayne.
- January, 1975: Medea (Feminist version) Westbeth Cabaret Theater
  - Playwright: Gloria Albee, chosen in the Collective’s national playwriting contest for women playwrights
  - Direction: Director: Patricia Carmichael. Producing Director: Nancy Rhodes
  - Cast: Chris Weatherhead, Julian Maile, Norman Parker, Fonna Faye Isaacson, David heveran, Ron Lawrance, Robert Burgos, Ann Goodman, Rachael Milder, James Carruthers, Winston May, Kip Williams, Nadia Dajani, Nomi MItty
  - Other support: Set Design: Jean Warfield. Lighting Design: Diane Smith. Technical Director. Pat Moeser. Costumes: Louise Krozek. Asst Director: Emily Garlick. Stage Manager: Karin Young. Electrician: Josephine Steinway.
- April, 1975: Jumpin' Salty - Westbeth Cabaret Theater
  - Depicting feminist events beginning in 1910 ranging from the tragic Triangle Factory Fire to Angela Davis and Harriet Tubman meeting on the Underground Railroad.
  - Playwrights: Gayle Austin, Gwen Gunn, Linda Kline, Christina Maile, Sally Ordway, Megan Terry, Dolores Deane Walker
  - Direction: Producing Director: Nancy Rhodes, Director: Lynn Guara. Music: Elizabeth Swados. Lyrics: Eve Merriam
  - Cast: Chris Campbell, Allen Kleinmen, Peter Murphy, Donna Perich, Margaret Pine, Susan Sandler, Greer Smith, John Stravinsky
  - Other support: Set: Pat Woodbridge. Costumes: Jean Steinlein. Lights: Shirley Prendergast. Asst Director: Marlene Swartz. Stage Manager: Emily Garlick. Choreographer: Kay Wylie.
- Tours: In addition to producing plays, the group had an active playwrights’ workshop which toured at various times, Stony Brook University, Hofstra University, Adelphi University, and Douglas College, and performed at conferences, such as 1973 Modern Library Association annual meeting, as well as in a kibbutz in Israel, the Smithsonian Museum, and on college campuses in Colorado, California, Wisconsin, Ithaca, NY and Vancouver, BC.
- Workshops: Bimonthly, the Westbeth Playwrights Feminist Collective presented works in progress.

The Collective also presented the work of other feminists:

- March, 1974: Judy Grahn – Poet
- April, 1974: Poetry of Rage – sponsored by Poets & Writers –
  - Poets: Diane Gioseffi, Judy Grahn, Patricia Horan, Lucille Iverson, Honor Moore, Anita Steckel, Ann Witten
- 1975 New York Feminist Troop production of "But Something Was Wrong with the Princess"
  - written by Lucy Winer Director: Eileen Mitchell
- Experiments With Film: Doris Chase, Storm De Hirsch, Doris Samotowitz, Pat Sloan

== Disbanding ==
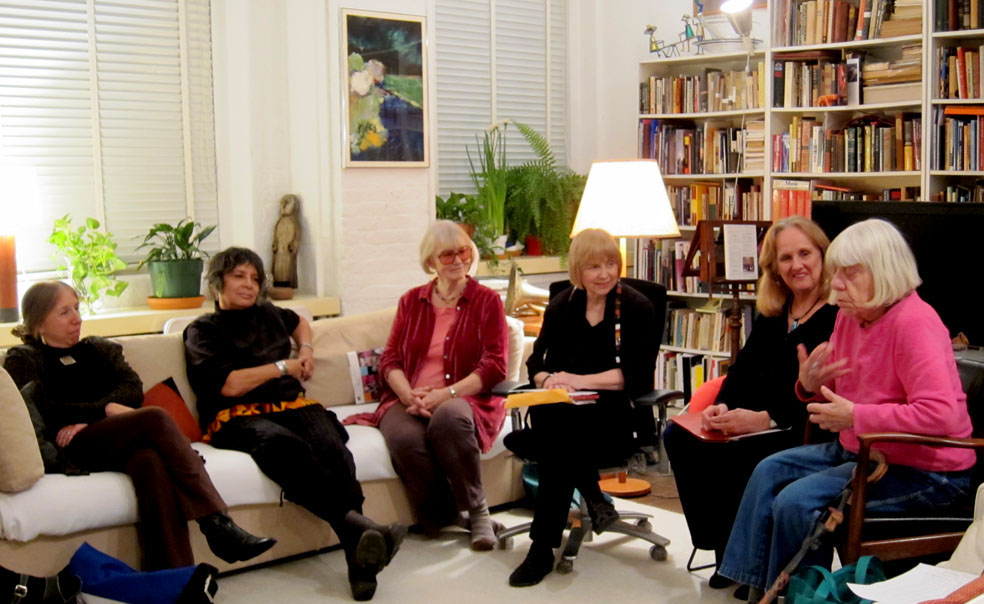
Westbeth Playwrights Feminist Collective at videtoped interview in 2011. From left to right, Marjorie Melnick, Christina Maile, Gwen Gunn, Dolores Walker, Nancy Rhodes, and Helen Duberstein. Photo by Lauren Maile.

After five years of theatre productions, the Westbeth Playwrights Collective disbanded, each member to pursue individual careers - some as playwrights, poets, television and nonfiction writers. Others, perhaps encouraged by the avenues of opportunity they had striven to open, became bishops, attorneys, landscape architects, publishers, printmakers, and videographers.

Recently a group of Collective playwrights and directors met in an hour-long videotaped interview to recall the above events.

== New York Historical Society ==
Due to the historic presence of the Westbeth Playwrights Feminist Collective in the early days of the Women's movement, the New York Historical Society gathered material - photos, correspondence, scripts, and ephemera - of the Westbeth Playwrights Feminist Collective to add to its collections.

Abstract: Records of the short-lived but groundbreaking Westbeth Playwrights' Feminist Collective, one of the earliest feminist theater groups in the United States. Incorporated 1972 and dissolved 1976, the WPFC was headquartered at the historic Westbeth Artists' Housing on West Street, Manhattan, and produced plays by feminist authors focused on issues central to the women's movement like sexual harassment and workplace inequality. The collection includes scripts, publicity material, articles and reviews, some correspondence, ephemera, and photographs of select production scenes and WP members.

Quantity: 1.04 Linear Feet (in 3 boxes)

Call Phrase: MS 3056

Historical Note: The Westbeth Playwrights' Feminist Collective (WPFC) — named for its headquarters in the Westbeth Artists' Housing (in the historic Bell Telephone Laboratories Complex at 445-465 West Street, Manhattan) — was one of the earliest feminist theater groups in the United States. Incorporated on 19 October 1972, its founding members included the multi-talented playwrights Helen Duberstein, Hélène Dworzan, Patricia Horan, Gwendolyn Gunn, Christina (a.k.a. Chryse) Maile, Sally Ordway, Dolores Deane Walker, and Susan Yankowitz. Its Board of Sponsors, a who's who of American feminism of the day, included theater critic Margaret Croyden, activist Florynce Kennedy, poet Muriel Rukeyser, and Ms. magazine co-founder Gloria Steinem.

The plays of the WPFC focused on issues at the core of the women's movement like sexual harassment, workplace inequality, dominance and submission, and the exclusion of female celebrants by the religious patriarchy. Productions were staged in several Manhattan venues, among them the Theater for the New City, Joseph Jefferson Company, and, at Westbeth, the Westbeth Cabaret and Gallery Theater. Titles include "Rape-In" (May 1971), "Up! An Uppity Revue" (February 1972), "Wicked Women Revue" (January 1973), "? ! A Revue" (May 1973), "We Can Feed Everybody Here" (January 1974), "What Time of Night It Is" (May 1974), "Medea" (January 1975), and "Jumpin' Salty" (April 1975). As publicity for "Jumpin' Salty" — which showcased the lives of notable women in American history such as birth control advocate Margaret Sanger and the largely female victims of the 1911 Triangle Shirtwaist Factory fire — the WPFC organized a march through Greenwich Village, with stops to hear speakers at sites connected to the women and events.

The WPFC staged a production of the Gertrude Stein-Virgil Thomson opera based on the life of Susan B. Anthony, "The Mother of Us All" (April–May 1976). They also sponsored readings by poets, Judy Grahn and Honor Moore, and hosted screenings of the work of women filmmakers.

== Bibliography and references ==
Archival references and material:

- Karen V Kukil, Assoc Curator of Special Collections, Smith College, Northampton, MA
- Cara Gilgen, Curator Special Collections, Kent State University, ILL
- Micah Hoggatt, Reference Associate, Houghton Library, Collection of Alix Jeffries, Harvard University, MA

=== Bibliography ===
==== Reviews – news and television ====
- Bilowit, Ira J., Up! An Uppity Revue, Show Business, Review, March 9, 1972
- Blevins, Tone, Theater in Review: Westbeth Workshop, SOHO News, December 20, 1973
- Rojas, Gloria, The Wicked Women Revue, Midday Live, WNEW-TV, Review, January, 1973
- Sainer, Arthur, Up! An Uppity Revue, Village Voice, Review, March 9, 1972
- Sanders, Kevin, Up! An Uppity Revue, Eyewitness News, WABC-TV, Review, March, 1972
- Sanders, Kevin, The Wicked Women Revue, Eyewitness News, WABC-TV, Review, January, 1973
- Stoldowsky, Ellen, Up! An Uppity Revue, On the Boards, Metropolitan Review, March, 1972
- Thompson, Howard, Theater: An Original ?!, New York Times, Review, May 26, 1973
- Wasserman, Debbie, The Wicked Women Revue, Show Business, Review, January, 1973

==== Books ====
- Brown, Janet, Feminist Drama: Definition and Critical Analysis, Metuchen NJ: Scarecrow Press, 1979
- Brown, Janet, Taking Center Stage: Feminism in Contemporary U.S. Drama, Metuchen, NJ: Scarecrow Press, 1991
- Cambridge History of American Theatre, vol 3: Post World War II to the 1990s. Don B Wilmeth, C W E Bigsby, Cambridge University Press, 2000
- Canning, Charlotte, Feminist Theaters in the U.S.A.: Staging Women’s Experience, London and U.S.A. Routledge, 1996
- Leavitt, Dinah L., Feminist Theatre Groups, McFarland, 1980
- Olsen, Christopher, Off-Off Broadway/ The Second Wave: 1968-1980, 2011, ISBN 978-1-4609-3313-8

==== Articles ====
- Bilowit, Ira J., Sexism Is A State of Mind –In Theatre, At Drama Desk, Show Business, February 8, 1973
- Croyden, Margaret, Women Directors and Playwrights, Viva Magazine, May 1974
- Dace, Tish, Marking Their Own Opportunities: Women’s Theatres in New York, Back Stage, March 9, 2001
- Johnston, Laurie, Sexism in Theater Can Be a Boon: At the Drama Desk Luncheon, Theater Section, New York Times, February 8, 1973
- Johnston, Laurie, Women Activism Turns to Alternatives in Arts, Theater Section, New York Times, March 21, 1973
- Killian, Linda, Feminist Theater, Feminist Art Journal, vol. 3, no. 1, 1974
- Killian, Linda, The Westbeth Feminist Collective, The Metropolitan Review, New York City
- Killian, Linda, The Chronicle, Hempstead, NY, April 5, 1973
- Lowell, Sondra, New Feminist Theater, Ms. Magazine, August, 1972, p. 17–21
- Moore, Honor, Theater Will Never Be the Same, Ms. Magazine, December, 1977
- Rea, Charlotte, Women’s Theatre Groups, Drama Review, vol. 16, no. 2, June, 1972, pp. 79–89
- Jumpin’ Salty (event announcement), New York Magazine, vol. 8, no. 17, April 28, 1975, p. 22
- Westbeth Playwrights Feminist Collective Benefit, New York Magazine, vol. 7, no. 8, February 25, 1974, p. 51
- Performances On Street and Stage: Village Heroines – Yesterday and Today, The Villager, Greenwich Village, April 17, 1975
- Woolman, Elizabeth, Emancipation or Exploitation: Gender Liberation and Adult Musicals 1970's New York, Studies in Musical Theater, vol 2, no. 1, 2008

==== External references ====
- Official Website
- Greene, Alexis, What Women Want"
- Westbeth Playwrights' Feminist Collective Records at the New-York Historical Society.
