= Tonda (name) =

Tonda is a Czech masculine given name that is a diminutive form of Antonín used in the Czech Republic. Notable people with this name include the following:

== Given name ==
- Tonda L. Hughes, American nursing academic
- Tonda Eckert, German football coach

== Surname ==
- Joseph Tonda (born 1952), French, Congolese and Gabonese sociologist and anthropologist
- Patrice Tonda, Gabonese politician and diplomat

== See also ==
- Tonda (disambiguation)
- Toda (surname)
- Tona (name)
- Tonga (name)
- Tonja (name)
- Tonka (name)
- Tonia (name)
- Tonra, a surname
- Tonya (given name)
