= Tanya (name) =

- Pronunciation: /ˈtɑːnjə/, /ˈtænjə/
- Gender: Feminine
- Language: Aramaic; Ancient Greek; Latin; Persian; Russian; Sanskrit; Ukrainian; Shona

Origin
- Origin: Slavic; Latin
- Meaning: Short form of Tatiana; Ancient Greek (Establisher, Decider); Hebrew ('תניא', it was taught); Latin ('tatius', great); Russian (Ruler, Regent); Sanskrit (Daughter); Persian (unique girl); Shona (short for Tanyaradzwa, “we have been comforted”)

Other names
- Variant form: LaTanya

Tanya or Tania is the Slavic hypocoristic of Tatiana. It is commonly used as an independent given name in the English-speaking world.

The name's popularity among English-speakers (and other non-Slavs) was originally due to the popularity of Alexander Pushkin's verse novel Eugene Onegin, whose heroine is Tatiana "Tanya" Larina (who is rarely named by the short name in the poem).

In Zimbabwe, Tanya is commonly used as a feminine given name and is often a shortened form of the Shona name Tanyaradzwa, which means "we have been comforted" or "we have been consoled". The name is typically given in times of emotional healing or recovery. Notable Zimbabwean figures with this name include British–Zimbabwean actress Tanyaradzwa "Tanya" Fear and motocross champion Tanyaradzwa "Tanya" Muzinda.

Variants include Tania (Ukrainian, Romanian); Tanja (Bosnian/Croatian/Serbian, Norwegian, German, Danish, Estonian, Finnish, Dutch, Slovene and Macedonian); Táňa (Czech); Tânia; (Portuguese); and Taanya (Levant and Indian subcontinent).

As of 2010 it was the 237th most common name in the United States, according to namestatistics.com, which uses US Census data.

== Notable people with the name ==
- Lara Saint Paul, born Silvana Savorelli (1945–2018), also known as Tanya, Italian-Eritrean singer, entertainer and record producer
- Tanya Acosta (born 1991), Argentine volleyball player
- Tanya Aguiñiga (born 1978), Mexican-American artist, designer, and activist
- Tanya Atwater (born 1942), American geophysicist and marine geologist
- Tanya Bardsley (born 1981), English model and reality television personality
- Tanya Bertoldi (born 1986), Argentine politician
- Tanya Jones Bosier (born 1973), American lawyer and judge
- Tanya Boychuk (born 2000), Canadian soccer player
- Tanya Burgoyne, American politician
- Tanya Burr (born 1989), English vlogger and blogger
- Tanya Byron (born 1967), British psychologist
- Tanya Chan (born 1971), Hong Kong politician
- Tanya Chisholm (born 1983), American actress and dancer
- Tanya Christiansen, American mathematician
- Tanya Chua (born 1975), Singaporean singer and songwriter
- Tanya Chutkan (born 1962), American lawyer and jurist
- Tania Coleridge (born 1966), English model and actress
- Tanya Compas, British activist
- Tanya Diagileva (born 1991), Belarusian model
- Tanya Donelly (born 1966), American musician
- Tanya Dubnicoff (born 1969), Canadian track cyclist
- Tanya Dziahileva (born 1991), Belarusian model
- Tanya Flanagan, American politician
- Tanya Fear (born 1989 as Tanyaradzwa Fear), British-Zimbabwean actress, writer, and filmmaker
- Tanya Garcia (born 1981), Filipina television and film actress
- Tanya Garcia-O'Brien (born 1973), American skyflyer
- Tanya Haden (born 1971), American musician and artist
- Tanya Hansen (born 1973), Norwegian pornographic actress
- Tanya Harford (born 1958), South African tennis player
- Tanya Hennessy (born 1985), Australian content creator, comedian, writer and television presenter
- Tanya Hughes (born 1972), American high jumper
- Tanya Hunks (born 1980), Canadian swimmer
- Tanya Nicole Kach (born 1981), American kidnapping victim
- Tanya Kappo, Canadian lawyer and Indigenous rights activist
- Tanya Lokshina (born 1973), Russian human rights activist
- Tanya Maniktala (born 1997), Indian actress
- Tanya Mercado (also known as Gina Lynn) (born 1974), Puerto Rican pornographic actress
- Tanya Moodie (born 1972), Canadian-British actress
- Tanya Moore (1955–1986), American murder victim
- Tanya Zolotoroff Nash (1898–1987), Ukrainian-American Jewish Deaf rights activist
- Tanya Neiman (1949–2006), American lawyer and activist
- Tanya Oxley (born 1979), Barbadian track and field sprinter
- Tanya Petty, German ten-pin bowler
- Tanya Plibersek (born 1969), Australian politician
- Tanya Ravichandran (born 1996), Indian actress
- Tanya Reynolds (born 1991), English actress
- Tanya Roberts (1949–2021), American actress
- Tanya Ryno (born 1970), American television producer and businesswoman
- Tanya Savicheva (1930–1944), Russian diarist and victim of the Siege of Leningrad
- Tanya Sharma (born 1995), Indian television actress
- Tanya Simon, American television producer
- Tanya Snyder (born 1967), American businesswoman
- Tanya Stephens (born 1973), Jamaican singer and deejay
- Tanya Lee Stone (born 1965), American author
- Tanya Streeter (born 1973), British-Caymanian-American freediver
- Tanya Tagaq (born 1975), Canadian Inuk throat singer
- Tanya Tate (born 1979), English model and pornographic actress
- Tanya Taylor, Canadian fashion designer
- Tanya Trotter, American actress, musician and author
- Tanya Tucker (born 1958), American country music singer
- Tanya Ury (born 1951), German activist, author and artist
- Tanya Van Court, American executive and CEO
- Tanya Vyhovsky, American social worker and politician
- Tanya Waqanika, Fijian politician
- Tanya Warren (born 1965), American basketball coach
- Tanya Wexler (born 1970), American film director
- Tanya Woo, American politician
- Tanya Wright (born 1971), American actress
- Tanya Zanish-Belcher, American archivist
- Tanya Zelevinsky, American scientist

== Fictional characters ==
- Tanya, character in the Mortal Kombat universe
- Agent Tanya Adams, soldier in the Command & Conquer: Red Alert video game series
- Tanya Grotter, a character in a Russian fantasy novel series by Dmitri Yemets
- Tanya Mousekewitz, from the film An American Tail
- Tanya Robertson, from the movie Sleepwalkers
- Tanya Sloan, character from Power Rangers Turbo
- Tanya Turner, lead character on the ITV drama Footballers' Wives

== See also ==
- Tania
- Tanja
- Tonia (name)
- Tonja (name)
- Tonje
- Tonya (given name)
