= Tonal system =

Tonal system can refer to

- Arab tone system, the modern Arabic system of musical tuning
- Chromatic scale or twelve-tone scale, a set of twelve pitches used in tonal music
- Tone (linguistics), the use of pitch in language to distinguish lexical or grammatical meaning
- Tonality, the arrangement of pitches and / or chords of a musical work
- Tonal system (Nystrom) a base 16 system of notation, arithmetic, and metrology proposed in 1859 by John W. Nystrom

== See also ==
- Equal temperament
- Signal tone
- Tonal (disambiguation)
- Tone (disambiguation)
- Tone mapping
