= Toner =

Toner may refer to:

- Toner (printing), a powder mixture used in laser printers and photocopiers
- Toner (skin care), a water-based lotion, tonic, or wash designed to cleanse the skin in preparation for other skincare products
- Hair toner, product used in hair dying
- Toner cartridge, component of a laser printer which contains toner powder
  - Toner refill, refilling empty laser printer toner cartridges with new toner powder
- Toner, a chemical used in photographic print toning
- Toner (surname), surname in English and Turkish

== See also ==
- John L. Toner Award
- Toner Prize for Excellence in Political Reporting
- Tone
