= Toxin (disambiguation) =

A toxin is a naturally occurring organic poison produced by the metabolic activities of living cells or organisms.

Toxin or Toxins may also refer to:

- Naturally occurring non-organic toxicants such as arsenic
- Synthetic analogs of naturally occurring organic poisons
- Toxin (novel), a 1998 novel by Robin Cook
- Toxin (character), a fictional character by Marvel Comics universe, "grandson" of Venom and ally of Spider-Man
- Toxins (journal), an academic journal focusing on toxicology

== See also ==
- Tocsin (disambiguation), a form of alarm
- Toxicity (disambiguation)
- Toxification, the biological process of increasing toxicity
- Toxxin, a ring name of Christina Von Eerie (born 1989), American professional wrestler
