= Tanja =

Tanja (Serbian: Тања) is a feminine given name. It may refer to:

== Mononyms ==
- Tanja (born 1983), Russian-Estonian singer, also known as Tanja Mihhailova

== Given name ==
- Tanja Andrejeva (born 1978), Macedonian handball player
- Tanja Bogosavljević (born 1989), Serbian handball player
- Tanja Bošković (born 1953), Serbian actress
- Tanja Carovska, Macedonian singer, songwriter, and composer
- Tanja Chub (born 1970), Ukrainian-Dutch draughts player
- Tanja Damaske (born 1971), German javelin thrower
- Tanja Dickenscheid (born 1969), German field hockey player
- Tanja Dragić (born 1991), Serbian Paralympian athlete
- Tanja Eisenschmid (born 1993), German ice hockey player
- Tanja Eisner (born 1980), Ukrainian and German mathematician
- Tanja Fajon (born 1971), Slovenian politician and a journalist
- Tanja Frieden (born 1976), Swiss snowboarder
- Tanja Godina (born 1970), Slovenian backstroke swimmer
- Tanja Goering, American politician
- Tanja Groen (born 1975), Dutch teenage woman who has been missing since 1993
- Tanja Hart (born 1974), German volleyball player
- Tanja Hess, German bobsledder
- Tanja Jacobs, Canadian actor and director
- Tanja Jadnanansing (born 1967), Dutch politician, television presenter and communication employee
- Tanja Kari, Finnish Paralympic cross-country skier
- Tanja Karišik-Košarac (born 1991), Bosnian cross country skier
- Tanja Karpela (born 1970), Finnish politician and former Miss Finland
- Tanja Kiridžić (born 1986), Croatian handball player
- Tanja Karišik (born 1991), cross country skier and athlete from Bosnia and Herzegovina
- Tanja Klein (born 1969), German track and road cyclist
- Tanja Kolbe (born 1990), German ice dancer
- Tanja Kostić (born 1972), Serbian-Swedish women's basketball player
- Tanja Kreil (born 1977), German electrician
- Tanja Krienke (born 1972), former competitive figure skater for East Germany
- Tanja Liedtke (1977–2007), German-born professional choreographer and dancer
- Tanja Lorentzon (born 1971), Sweden-Finnish actress
- Tanja Mayer (born 1993), Swiss athlete and bobsledder
- Tanja Mihhailova (born 1983), Russian-Estonian singer, known as Tanja
- Tanja Milanović (born 1977), Serbian handballer
- Tanja Miletić Oručević (born 1970), Bosnian theatre director, academic lecturer, and translator
- Tanja Morel (born 1975), Swiss skeleton race
- Tanja Nijmeijer (born 1978), Dutch guerilla fighter
- Tanja Ostojić (born 1972), performance artist from Yugoslavia
- Tanya Plibersek (born 1969), Australian politician
- Tanja Ribič (born 1968), Slovenian actress and a singer
- Tanja Savić (born 1985), Serbian pop-folk singer
- Tanja Schärer (born 1989), Swiss freestyle skier
- Tanja Schmidt-Hennes (born 1971), German professional cyclist
- Tanja Schneider (born 1974), Austrian former alpine skier
- Tanja Schuck, German sprint canoer
- Tanja Slater (born 1978), road cyclist from United Kingdom
- Tanja Šmid, Slovenian swimmer
- Tanja Tuomi (born 1996), Finnish tennis player
- Tanja Szewczenko (born 1977), German figure skater and actress
- Tanja Vrabel (born 1990), Slovenian football player
- Tanja Vučković (born 1981), Serbian handball player
- Tanja Wedhorn (born 1971), German actress
- Tanja Wenzel (born 1978), German film and TV actress
- Tanja Žagar (born 1982)
- Tanja Žakelj (born 1988), Slovenian racing cyclist

== Fictional characters ==
- Tanja von Lahnstein, a fictional character from the German soap opera Verbotene Liebe

== Ships ==
- Tanja (ship, 1959), a ferry used on the Elbe in Germany

== See also ==
- Alternate name of Tanya, a given name
- Tanya (name)
- Tania (name)
- Tonya (name)
- Tonje (name)
- Tonja (name)
- Tonia (name)
