= Tonik =

Tonik may refer to:

- Tonik (bank), a bank in the Philippines
- Tonik, a fabric made of mohair and wool
- Tonik Energy, a former energy supplier acquired by Scottish Power

== See also ==
- Tonic (disambiguation)
