= Tone (name) =

Tone, Tóne or Þone is a given name, nickname and a surname. Tone is a Slovene masculine given name in use as a short form of Anton in Slovenia. It is also a Danish, Finnish, Norwegian and Swedish feminine given name used as an alternate form of Tony and a short form of Antona in Norway, Sweden, Finland, Republic of Karelia, Estonia, Greenland and Denmark. Tóne is a Portuguese masculine given name in use as a diminutive of Antônio and António in Portugal, Brazil, South Africa, Namibia, Angola and Mozambique. Þone is an Old Norse feminine given name that is used as a form of Torny in parts of Norway, Sweden, Iceland, France, England and Scotland as well as in Denmark.

== Given name ==
=== Female ===
- Tone Åse (born 1965), Norwegian singer
- Tone Benjaminsen, Norwegian cyclist
- Tone Heimdal Brataas (born 1970), Norwegian politician
- Tone Dahle (born 1945), Norwegian cross-country skier
- Tone Damli (born 1988), Norwegian singer
- Tone Danielsen (born 1946), Norwegian actress
- Tone Gunn Frustøl (born 1975), Norwegian footballer
- Tone Haugen (born 1964), Norwegian professional footballer
- Tone Hødnebø (born 1962), Norwegian poet, translator and magazine editor
- Tone Groven Holmboe (1930–2020), Norwegian composer
- Tone Hulbækmo (born 1957), Norwegian singer and musician
- Tone Liljeroth (born 1975), Norwegian politician
- Tone Lise Moberg (born 1970), Norwegian singer
- Tone Mostraum (born 1974), Norwegian actress
- Tone Tangen Myrvoll (born 1965), Norwegian deaf cross country skier
- Tone Nyhagen (1963–2015), Norwegian sport dancer
- Tone Norum (born 1965), Swedish singer
- Tone Pahle (born 1954), Norwegian sport rower
- Tone Rasmussen (born 1968), Norwegian canoer
- Tone Rønoldtangen (born 1953), Norwegian trade unionist and politician
- Tone Thiis Schjetne (1928–2015), Norwegian sculptor
- Tone Schwarzott (born 1941), Norwegian actress and poet
- Tone Sekelius (born 1997), Swedish social media influencer and singer
- Tone Anne Alvestad Seland, Norwegian handball player
- Tone Skogen (born 1953), Norwegian civil servant and politician
- Tone Sønsterud (born 1959), Norwegian politician
- Tone Sverdrup (born 1951), Norwegian jurist
- Tone Tingsgård (born 1944), Swedish politician
- Tone Vigeland (born 1938), Norwegian goldsmith/silversmith and jewelry designer
- Tone Wilhelmsen Trøen (born 1966), Norwegian politician

=== Male ===
- Tone Čufar (1905–1942), Slovene writer and playwright
- Tone Dečman (1913–1989), Slovene skier
- Tone Đurišič (born 1961), Slovene cross-country skier
- Tone Gazzari (1912–1996), Yugoslav swimmer
- Tone Glenn Küsel-Gabriel (born 1996), Ghanaian footballer
- Tone Kham (fl. 1633–1637), king of Lan Xang
- Tone Kopelani (born 1978) New Zealand rugby player
- Tone Kralj (1900–1975), Slovene artist
- Tone Pavček (1928–2011), Slovene poets, translators, and essayists
- Tone Partljič (born 1940), Slovene writer and politician
- Tone Perčič (born 1954), Slovene writer and translator
- Tone Peršak (born 1947), Slovene politician
- Tone Razinger (fl. 1921), Slovene cross-country skier
- Tone Tiselj (born 1961), Slovene handball coach and player
- Tone Wieten (born 1994), Dutch rower
- Tone Žnidaršič (1923–2007), Slovene artist

== Stage name/nickname ==
- Tone, American producer and member of the production group Trackmasters
- Tone, alias of Tony Chung, member of Taiwanese-American mainstream pop duo Cool Silly
- Chef Tone, professional name of Tony Scales (born 1983), American male songwriter and record producer
- Juris Tone (born 1961), Latvian male bobsledder
- King Tone, nickname of Antonio Fernandez, American male gang leader
- Tone Bell, professional name of Michael Anthony Bell II (born 1983), American male stand-up comedian and actor
- Tone Brulin, whose birthname was Antoon Maria Albert van den Eynde (1926–2019), Belgian male dramatist
- Tone Hočevar, nickname of Antun Hočevar (born 1951), Yugoslav male canoeist
- Tone Janša, nickname of Anton Janša (born 1943), Slovene male jazz musician
- Tone Lōc, stage name of Anthony Terrell Smith, (born 1966), American male rapper and actor
- Tone Pogačnik, nickname of Anton Pogačnik (1919–2013), Slovene male cross-country skier
- Tone Seliškar, nickname of Anton Seliškar (1900–1969), Slovene male writer, poet, journalist and teacher
- Tone Trump, stage name of Tony Brice, (born 1977), American male rapper

== Fictional characters ==
- Dial Tone (G.I. Joe), two G. I. Joe toyline characters
- Tone (Needlefight!), A gang leader in the film Needlefight!

== Surname ==
- Tone (surname)

== See also ==
- Tone (disambiguation)
- Ross Tones, a.k.a. Throwing Snow, producer for the music group Snow Ghosts
- Tønes (born 1972), artistic name of Norwegian singer Frank Tønnesen
- Toney (name)
- Tono (name)
- Tonye
