= Latonia =

Latonia may refer to:

- Latonia (frog), a genus of frogs in the family Alytidae
- Latonia, Covington, a place in Kentucky
- Latonia Blackman (born 1982), Barbadian netball player
- Latonia Harris, American chemical engineer
- Latonia Moore (born 1979), American opera singer

== See also ==
- Tonia (disambiguation)
- LaTonya (name)
- LaTanya (name)
- Latania, a palm tree
- La Tania, Savoie, France; a ski resort
- Latonia Derby
- Latonia Lakes, Kentucky
- Latonia Race Track
