= Tamunotonye =

Tamuntonye
- Pronunciation: /təmuːnɔːtoʊnjeɪ/
- Gender: Unisex
- Language: Ijaw, Okrika, kalabari, Nembe

Origin
- Origin: Rivers State, Bayelsa State, Delta State
- Meaning: God's will, God's desire, God's plan, favor from God
- Region of origin: Nigerian

Tamunotonye is a Nigerian unisex given name, which originates from Ijaw. The name is most commonly used among the Kalabari, Okrika, and Nembe people of Rivers State, Bayelsa State, and the Egbema and Gbaramatu Ijaws of Delta State. It means "God's will", "God's desire", "favor from God", or "God's plan" in English. Similarly, there is the name Sotonye, also unisex, which means “heaven’s will” or “heaven’s desire”. Their most common diminutive is Tonye, often given as a standalone name.

The name may refer to:

- Tonye Briggs-Oniyide, Rivers State Culture and Tourism Commissioner
- Tonye Cole (born 1967), businessman
- Tonye Garrick, British-born Nigerian singer
- Alabo Tonye Graham-Douglas (born 1939), Nigerian politician
- Tonye Ibiama (born 1974), Nigerian businessman
- Tonye Patano (born 1961), American actress
- Prince Tonye Princewill (born 1969), Nigerian politician
