= Tonge (surname) =

Tonge is a surname. Notable people with the surname include:

- Dale Tonge, English footballer
- Gavin Tonge, West-Indian cricketer
- Israel Tonge, English divine
- Jenny Tonge, British politician
- Michael Tonge, English footballer
- Roger Tonge, British actor

== See also ==
- Tonie, name
- Tonye
