= Tocsin =

A tocsin is an alarm or other signal sounded by a bell or bells. It may refer to:

== Cold War ==
- TOCSIN, the codeword attached by the Royal Observer Corps to any reading on the Bomb Power Indicator or the Atomic Weapons Detection Recognition and Estimation of Yield (AWDREY) system after a nuclear strike on the United Kingdom during the Cold War
- Exercise Tocsin, a name for the nuclear attack simulation performed by the Government of Canada
- Tocsin, a Harvard undergraduate group against nuclear weapons and by 1963 also against the Vietnam War, led by Todd Gitlin

== Music ==
- Tocsin (album), a 1984 album by gothic rock band Xmal Deutschland
- Tocsin, a 2013 album by French shoegaze band Year of No Light
- the fourth and final movement of the Symphony No. 11 (1957) by Dmitri Shostakovich

== Newspapers ==
- The Tocsin, an early Australian socialist newspaper
- Tocsin, a newspaper from Red Bluff, California; see California Digital Newspaper Collection
- Marin County Tocsin, a newspaper from Marin County, California; see California Digital Newspaper Collection
- Tehama Tocsin, an early name of the Chico Enterprise-Record newspaper in Tehama, California
- Tocsin News, or The Enterprise-Tocsin, a newspaper in Mississippi
- The Tocsin of Liberty, an anti-slavery newspaper from the Liberty Party (United States, 1840)

== Other ==
- Tocsin, Indiana, a small town in the United States
- "The Tocsin", a poem by John Pierpont
