= Tinja =

Tinja may refer to:

- Tinja, Tunisia, a town near Bizerte in northern Tunisia
- Tinja (river), a right tributary of Sava in Bosnia
- Tinja Gornja, a village in Bosnia and Herzegovina
- Tinja Donja, a village in Bosnia and Herzegovina

== See also ==
- Tonja (name)
- Tinje (disambiguation)
