= Tonie =

Tonie is a Swedish unisex given name and a nickname that is a diminutive form of Antonia in Sweden. It is also a Dutch unisex given name that is a diminutive form of Antonia, Antonius, Anton, Antoon, Anthonis, and Anthoon in use in Suriname, South Africa, Namibia, Indonesia, Belgium and Netherlands. Notable people with this name include the following:

== Men ==
- Tonie Carroll (born 1976), New Zealander rugby footballer
- Tonie Holt (1932–2024), British retired Army engineer, military historians, author, and pioneer of the modern battlefield tour industry
- Tonie Walsh (born 1960), Irish LGBT rights activist, journalist, disc jockey

== Women ==
- Tonie Marshall (1951–2020), French actress, screenwriter, and film director
- Tonie Morgan (born 2004), American basketball player

== Male nickname ==
- Tonie Campbell nickname of Anthony Eugene Campbell (born 1960), American athlete

== Female nickname ==
- Tonie Nathan Theodora Nathalia Nathan (1923 – 2014), American political figure

== See also ==
- Toine, name
- Tone (disambiguation)
- Tonge (surname)
- Toni, name
- Tonia (name)
- Tonic (disambiguation)
- Tonies
- Tonin (disambiguation)
- Tonio (name)
- Tonite (disambiguation)
- Tonje (name)
- Tonne (name)
- Tonnie
- Tonye
- Towie (disambiguation)
- Townie (disambiguation)
- Tonic Chabalala
