= Towie =

Towie may refer to:

- Towie, Aberdeenshire
- Towie Barclay Castle, Aberdeenshire
- Towie Castle, Kildrummy, Aberdeenshire
- Towie (game), a three-hand variant of Bridge
- The Only Way Is Essex, a British reality television series

== See also ==
- Tonie
