= Tonya (given name) =

- Gender: Female

Origin
- Meaning: Short form of Antonia

Other names
- Alternative spelling: Tonja, Tonia
- Derived: LaTonya

Tonya is an English female given name. The name originated as a short form of Antonia with influence from the Spanish form Toña. It can be found throughout the English-speaking world but is most common in the United States. The popularity of the name has been influenced by its conflation with the unrelated name Tanya, which originated as a diminutive form of Tatiana.

Other spellings with similar derivations include Tonja and Tonia. The variant form LaTonya is particularly associated with African-American women.

== People called Tonya ==
=== Entertainment ===
- Tonya Cooley (born 1980), American model
- Tonya Crews (born 1938), American model
- Tonya Crowe (born 1971), American actress
- Tonya Kay, American actress and dancer
- Tonya Pinkins, American actress
- Tonya Williams (born 1958), Canadian actress

=== Sports ===
- Tonya Burns, American basketball player and coach
- Tonya Edwards (born 1968), American basketball coach
- Tonya Harding (born 1970), American ice skater
- Tonya Verbeek (born 1977), Canadian wrestler
- Tonya Washington (born 1977), American basketball player

=== Other fields ===
- Tonya Hurley, American writer and director
- Tonya Knight (born 1966), American bodybuilder
- Tonya Matthews, American biomedical engineer
- Tonya Rush, American politician
- Tonya Schuitmaker (born 1968), American politician

== See also ==
- Tona (name)
- Tanya (name)
- Tania (name)
- Tanja (name)
- Tonda (name)
- Tonja (name)
- Tonje (name)
- Tonia (name)
- Tonka (name)
- Tonye
