= Tonina (disambiguation) =

Toniná is a Mexican archaeological site and ruined Mayan city.

Tonina may also refer to:

- Tonina Dimech, Maltese footballer for First Division club Birkirkara FC
- Tonina dolphin, alternative name for the Amazon river dolphin
- Tonina fluviatilis, sole species in the plant genus Tonina and a member of the family Eriocaulaceae
- Tonina Jackson, primary ring name for Héctor Garza Lozano Vela (1917 – 1969), Mexican actor and professional wrestler also known as Héctor Lozano, Gordo Lozano and Pancho Morales
- Tonina (name), given name
- Tonina Torrielli (born 1934), Italian singer

== See also ==
- Tonia (disambiguation)
- Tonin (disambiguation)
- Tonino (disambiguation)
- Toninia, genus of fungi
