= Tonin (name) =

Tonin or Toñín is a masculine given name and a surname. Toñín is a Spanish masculine given name and nickname that is a diminutive form of Antonio in use in Spain, parts of the United States, Mexico, Cuba, Dominican Republic, Guatemala, Honduras, El Salvador, Nicaragua, Costa Rica, Western Panama, Colombia, Venezuela, Peru, Ecuador, Bolivia, Chile, Paraguay, Argentina, Uruguay, and the Falkland Islands. Notable people with this name include the following:

== Given name ==
- Tonin Harapi (1925–1991), Albanian composer and teacher

== Nickname ==
- Toñín Casillas nickname of José Antonio Casillas Fernández (born 1935), Puerto Rican former basketball player
- Toñín Llama, nickname of Jose Antonio Llama (born 1941), Cuban executive board

== Surname ==
- Matej Tonin (born 1983), Slovenian politician

== Fictional characters ==
- Theo and Sammy Tonin of Justified
- Tonin of Charges.com.br

== See also ==
- Tonin (disambiguation)
- Tobin (given name)
- Tobin (surname)
- Tomin (surname)
- Tonia (name)
- Tonina (name)
- Tonio (name)
- Tonni (name)
- Torin (given name)
- Tosin (given name)
- Tonic Chabalala
