= Tonal =

Tonal may refer to:

- Tonal (mythology), a concept in the belief systems and traditions of Mesoamerican cultures, involving a spiritual link between a person and an animal
- Tonal language, a type of language in which pitch is used to make phonemic distinctions
- Tonality, a system of writing music involving the relationship of pitch to some centered key
- "Tonal", a song by the American band Bright from the album The Albatross Guest House

== See also ==
- Tonal system (disambiguation)
- Tone (disambiguation)
