= John Toner =

John Toner might refer to:

- John Toner (bishop) (1857–1949), Scottish clergy man
- John Toner (footballer) (1923–2014), American football player, coach
- John Toner (physicist) (born 1955), American physicist
