= Tinje =

Tinje may refer to:

- Tinje, Nepal, a village
- Tinje, Konjic, a village in Bosnia and Herzegovina
- Malo Tinje, a village in Slovenia
- Veliko Tinje, a village in Slovenia

== See also ==
- Tinja (disambiguation)
