= Tonra =

Tonra is a surname in the English language. The surname is an Anglicised form of the Irish Ó Tomhnra.

== People with the surname ==
- Mark Tonra, American, cartoonist
- Elena Tonra, singer-songwriter of Daughter (band)

== See also ==
- Tona (name)
- Tonda (name)
- Tonja (name)
- Tonka (name)
