= Toga language =

Toga language may refer to:

- Lo-Toga language, an Oceanic language of Vanuatu
- Gizrra language, a Papuan language of Papua New Guinea
