= Exercise Tocsin =

Exercise Tocsin was an emergency preparedness drill held by the Government of Canada on November 13, 1961, that simulated a nuclear attack by the USSR on Canada. Every law enforcement agency, provincial, and municipal government took part in the exercise. Part of the exercise was a 13-minute radio program that was broadcast by every radio transmitter in the country. The broadcast told citizens of Canada what to do in the event of nuclear war.
