= Tanya Garcia-O'Brien =

American skyflyer (born 1973)

Tanya Garcia-O'Brien (née Garcia, born 1973) is an American extreme athlete and stuntwoman. She competed as a skysurfer and has performed film and commercials stuntwoman.

== Biography ==
Garcia-O'Brien is from Menifee, Southern California, United States. She was studied at the University of California, Los Angeles (UCLA). Before becoming a professional skysurfer in 1997, O'Brien-Garcia worked as a second-grade teacher.

Garcia O'Brien is married to Craig O'Brien, who operates as her camera flyer. Together they are known as team Perris Valley Firestarter. An image of Craig O'Brien leading a tracking dive on her skyboard by O'Brien featured on the cover of Parachutist Magazine in June 2000.

Garcia-O'Brien competed in skysurfing at the 2000 X Games in Sonoma, California, where she was one of the only women in the world participating in the sport. With team Perris Valley Firestarter, Garcia-O'Brien became U.S. National Champion in 1998, 2000, 2001, 2003, 2004 and 2007; the Fédération Aéronautique Internationale (FAI) World Champion in 1999 and 2001; and the FAI World Cup Champion in 2000.

Garcia' O'Brien featured as a skysurfer in a Mountain Dew commercial with Troy Hartman in 1998, which was filmed in the Lauterbrunnen valley in Switzerland. She also worked as an aerial stunt double for actress Lucy Liu in the film Charlie's Angels (2000).
