= Toga, Virginia =

Unincorporated community in Virginia, United States

Coordinates: 37°29′39″N 78°38′00″W

Toga is an unincorporated community in Buckingham County, in the U.S. state of Virginia.
