= Tonye Garrick =

Tonye
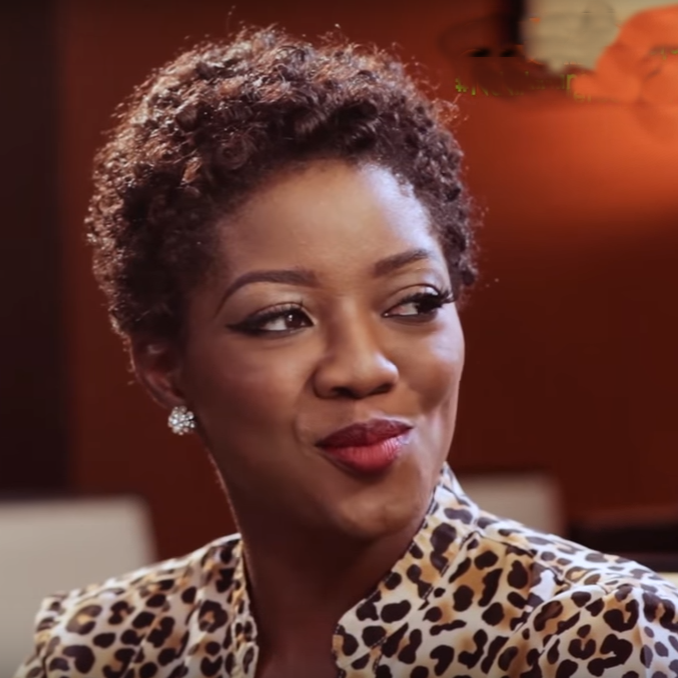
- on NdaniTV

Background information
- Born: Tamunotonye Nneka Nkiruka Ibiyemi Garrick; 27 August 1983 (age 43); England
- Origin: Lagos, Nigeria
- Genres: RnB; afropop; urban contemporary; Dancehall
- Occupations: Singer-songwriter, fashion and interior designer
- Instruments: Vocals; singing
- Years active: 2010–present
- Label: Made Men
- Website: iamtonye.com

Tonye Garrick (born 27 August 1982), simply known as Tonye is a British-born Nigerian singer and songwriter. Her a cappella song titled "What About Us?" was used at the Nigerian Youth Presidential debate in 2011. Born in England, Tonye was raised in France, Nigeria and the United States of America where she dropped her job as a business consultant to pursue a career in music in 2013. In 2015, she released a marriage-themed single title "Ari Belema" which got her nominated in the "Most Promising Act" category at the 2015 Nigeria Entertainment Awards. She is signed to Made Men Music Group since April 2016.

== Growing up ==
Tonye is a native of Benin City in Edo State, South-South Nigeria. Her name "Tamunotonye" was given to her by her grandmother who is a native of Kalabari, Rivers State. She grew up listening to songs by Whitney Houston, Janet Jackson, Celine Dion and Brenda Fassie before she developed her interest in music at the age of 7.

== Early life and education ==
Born in England into the family of an Edo State father who was a diplomat and an Anambra State mother, Tonye had most of her early life in Nigeria, Paris and the United States of America. She attended Vivian Fowler Memorial College and Queen's College, Lagos where she completed her secondary school education. She holds a bachelor's degree in International Business & Fashion Merchandising after graduating from Marymount University.

== Career ==
Prior to picking music as a profession, Tonye had previously worked for UBS Financial and Deloitte Touche Tohmatsu Limited as a business analyst. She dropped her corporate job for a career in music in 2013 and went on to release her first official single titled "Were Niyen" which was received to critical acclaim. On 2 October 2014, she released another song produced by Password titled "Criminal" which did well to gain grounds. In 2015, her song titled "Abi Belema" became popular and thus winning her a nomination at the 2015 Nigeria Entertainment Awards. She cites Whitney Houston, Janet Jackson, Brandy and Aaliyah as her musical influences. In an interview granted to Thisday Live on 21 June 2014, she said she is working on her debut studio album.

== Discography ==
List of singles as lead artist, with selected chart positions and certifications, showing year released and album name
Title	Year	Peak chart positions							Certifications	Album
Title	Year	NGA	GHA	RSA	US	US R&B	AUS	UK	Certifications	Album
"What About Us"	2010	—	—	—	—	—	—	—		Non-album singles
"Were Niyen"	2013	—	—	—	—	—	—	—		Non-album singles
"Wait For Me"	2014	—	—	—	—	—	—	—		Non-album singles
"Criminal"	2014	—	—	—	—	—	—	—		Non-album singles
"Criminal (Remix)" (featuring Timaya)	2014	—	—	—	—	—	—	—		Non-album singles
"Ari Belema"	2015	—	—	—	—	—	—	—		Non-album singles
"Written in The Stars"	2016	—	—	—	—	—	—	—		Non-album singles
"—" denotes a recording that did not chart or was not released in that territory.

== Awards and nominations ==
Year	Award ceremony	Prize	Result	Ref
2015	2015 Nigeria Entertainment Awards	Most Promising Act	Nominated	
2015	ELOY Awards	Music Artist of The Year	Nominated	

== See also ==
- List of Nigerian musicians
