= Tone (surname) =

Tone is a surname, and may refer to:

- Chiaki Tone (born 1992), Japanese baseball pitcher
- Franchot Tone (1905–1968), American actor
- Issei Tone (born 1996), Japanese footballer
- Juris Tone (born 1961) Latvian-Soviet bobsledder
- Kentaro Tone (born 1982), Japanese voice actor
- Lama Tone (born 1971), New Zealand rugby union footballer
- Mariko Tone (born 1962), Japanese singer, actress and essayist
- Matilda Tone (1769–1849), wife of Wolfe Tone
- Philip Willis Tone (1923–2001), American judge
- Ryosuke Tone (born 1991), Japanese football player
- Sulu Tone-Fitzpatrick (born 1992), New Zealand netball and rugby sevens player
- Toni Tone (born 1989), British-Nigerian author
- Wolfe Tone (1763–1798), Irish revolutionary
- Yasunao Tone (1935–2025), Japanese multidisciplinary artist
- Art Van Tone (1918–1990), American football player and coach
