= Tonga (name) =

Tonga as a given name or surname may refer to:

- Tonga Fifita (born 1959), semi-retired professional wrestler
- Tonga Leaʻaetoa (born 1977), New Zealand-Tongan rugby union player
- Tonga Mahuta (c. 1897 – 1947), New Zealand tribal leader
- Lord Tonga Tuʻiʻafitu (born 1962), Tongan clergyman and politician
- Charlie Tonga (born 1977), Tongan former professional rugby league footballer, and current coach of the Tongan national team
- Esi Tonga (born 1988), Australian rugby league player, brother of Willie Tonga
- Khyiris Tonga (born 1996), American football player
- Matangi Tonga (American football) (born 1988), American football player
- Willie Tonga (born 1983), Australian rugby league player, brother of Esi Tonga

== See also ==
- Tonga (disambiguation)
- Tona (name)
- Tonda (name)
- Tonja (name)
- Tonka (name)
