= Latonia Harris =

American chemical engineer

Latonia M. Harris is an American chemical engineer.

Born in Selma, Alabama, and educated in Detroit Public Schools, Harris earned her bachelor's degree in chemical engineering at the University of Michigan. Harris furthered her studies in the same subject at Northwestern University, where she completed a master's of science in 1997 and a doctorate in 2001. During her Ph.D., Harris was advised by Eleftherios Terry Papoutsakis and Neil Welker.

Upon graduating, Harris worked as a scientist for Schering-Plough, then moved to Janssen Pharmaceuticals. In 2020, Harris was elected a member of the United States National Academy of Engineering.
