= Tonon =

Tonon is a surname. Notable people with this surname include:

- Amelia Tonon (1899–1961), Italian entomologist
- Brigitte Affidehome Tonon, Beninois researcher, author, basketball coach, and former player
- Carlo Tonon (1955–1996), Italian road bicycle racer
- Garry Tonon (born 1991), American Brazilian Jiu-Jitsu practitioner
- Pedro Tonon Geromel (born 1985), Brazilian footballer
