= Tonry =

Tonry is a surname. Notable people with the surname include:

- Don Tonry (1935–2013), American gymnast
- Michael Tonry (born 1945), American criminologist and professor
- Richard Alvin Tonry (1935–2012), American politician
- Richard J. Tonry (1893–1971), American politician

== See also ==
- Torry (name)
