= Tone River (disambiguation) =

Tone River or River Tone may refer to:

- Tone River, a river of Japan
- River Tone, a river of England
- Tone River (Western Australia)
- Tone River (New Zealand)
