= Tone =

Tone may refer to:

== Visual arts and color-related ==
- Tone (color theory), a mix of tint and shade, in painting and color theory
- Tone (color), the lightness or brightness (as well as darkness) of a color
- Toning (coin), color change in coins
- Photographic print toning, a process that changes the color of monochromatic film, e.g. sepia tone
- Screentone, a technique for shading or patterning drawings

== Sound and music ==
- Tone (linguistics), the pitch and pitch changes in words of certain languages
- Tone (musical instrument), the audible characteristics of a musician's sound
- Musical tone, a sound characterized by its duration, pitch, intensity, and timbre
- Pure tone, a tone with a sinusoidal waveform
- Reciting tone, such as Psalm tone and recitative, as in Gregorian chants
- Tonality, a system of music based on a key "center", or tonic
- Tone control, a (typically electronic) control for affecting frequency content of an audio signal
- Whole tone, or major second, a commonly occurring musical interval

== Musical genres, groups, people and works ==
- 2 Tone (music genre) or Two Tone, a style of music combining elements of ska and punk
- Tone (DC band), a Washington, D.C., instrumental band formed in 1991
- Tone (jazz-fusion band), active 1974–1981
- Tone (musician), British musician, stage name of Basil Anthony Harewood
- Kentaro Tone, Japanese voice actor
- Yasunao Tone, Japanese-American experimental composer associated with Hi-Red Center and Fluxus
- Tones and I, Australian pop singer
- Tone (Jeff Ament album), a 2008 album by Jeff Ament
- Tone (TVXQ album), a 2011 album by Tohoshinki
- Tones (album), a 1986 album by Eric Johnson

== Places ==
- Tone, Gunma, Japan
- Tone, Ibaraki, Japan
- Tone, Somerset, England
- Tone River (disambiguation)

== Physiology ==
- Muscle tone, the state of tension or responsiveness of the organs or tissues of the body
- Toning exercises, the myth that specific exercises can develop "defined", but not necessarily large, musculature

== Other uses ==
- Tone (literature), a literary technique which encompasses the attitudes toward the subject and toward the audience implied in a literary work that is compatible with the other drive
- Tone (magazine), a New Zealand technology magazine
- Tone (name)
- Japanese ship Tone (pronounced "Toh-Neh"), three warships of Japan
- Tone policing, focusing on the emotion of a message rather than its content
- Tone's Spices, a brand owned by Associated British Foods
- Dual-tone multi-frequency signaling, a telecommunication signaling system, also known as "Touch-Tone"

== See also ==
- Toine
- Ton (disambiguation)
- Tona (name)
- Tonal (disambiguation)
- Tonic (disambiguation)
- Toney (disambiguation)
- Tonie
- Tune (disambiguation)
