= Toxic (disambiguation) =

Toxicity is a measure of the degree to which something is toxic or poisonous.

Toxic, toxicity, or similar terms may also refer to:

== Science ==
=== Natural sciences ===
- Toxicant, a chemical compound having an effect on living organisms
- Toxin, a substance produced by living cells or organisms
- Mycotoxin, toxins produced by fungi
- Toxic waste, any unwanted material which can cause harm

=== Social sciences ===
- Toxicity, a harmful personality trait across several types:
  - Toxic femininity
  - Toxic flattery
  - Toxic leader
  - Toxic masculinity
  - Toxic positivity
  - Toxic workplace
  - Toxicity, a gamer slang term for poor player behavior

== Arts, entertainment, and media ==
=== Music ===
- Toxic (The Gazette album), a 2011 album by the Gazette
- Toxic (Yours Truly album), a 2024 album by Yours Truly
- Toxicity (album), a 2001 album by System of a Down
  - "Toxicity" (song), the album's title track
- "Toxic" (song), a 2003 song by Britney Spears
- "Toxic" (BoyWithUke song), 2021
- "Toxic" (Playboi Carti and Skepta song), 2025
- "Toxic" (YG song), 2022
- "Toxic", a song by AP Dhillon, 2024
- "Toxic", a song by Ashnikko from Demidevil, 2021
- "Toxic", a song by Attila from Villain, 2019
- "Toxic", a song by Ayra Starr from 19 & Dangerous, 2021
- "Toxic", a song by Childish Gambino from Royalty, 2012
- "Toxic", a song by Crazy Town from The Gift of Game, 1999
- "Toxic", a song by Danny Brown from Twitch EP, 2018
- "Toxic", a song by Digga D from Made in the Pyrex, 2021
- "Toxic", a song by Front Line Assembly from Tactical Neural Implant, 1992
- "Toxic", a song by Gift of Gab from The Next Logical Progression, 2012
- "Toxic", a song by High and Mighty Color from Rock Pit, 2008
- "Toxic", a song by Huskii from Antihero, 2022
- "Toxic", a song by Kehlani from It Was Good Until It Wasn't, 2020
- "Toxic", a song by Ken Carson from A Great Chaos (deluxe edition), 2024
- "Toxic", a song by Kerry King from From Hell I Rise, 2024
- "Toxic", a song by Moneybagg Yo from 43va Heartless, 2019
- "Toxic", a song by Noname from Sundial, 2023
- "Toxic", a song by Only the Family from Loyal Bros, 2021
- "Toxic", a song by Peace from In Love, 2013
- "Toxic", a song by Polo G from Hall of Fame, 2021
- "Toxic", a song by Prince Po and Oh No from Animal Serum, 2014
- "Toxic", a song by Public Enemy from Nothing Is Quick in the Desert, 2017
- "Toxic", a song by Rittz from Put a Crown on It, 2019
- "Toxic", a song by Robbie Williams from In and Out of Consciousness, 2010
- "Toxic", a song by Sarah Darling from Angels & Devils, 2011
- "Toxic", a song by StaySolidRocky from Fallin', 2020
- "Toxic", a song by Summer Walker from Still Over It, 2021
- "Toxic", a song by Tink from Thanks 4 Nothing, 2023
- "Toxic", a song by Vanilla Ninja from Vanilla Ninja, 2003
- "Toxic!", a song by Jeremy Lee, 2024
- "toxic", a song by d3r and 6arelyhuman, 2023

=== Other arts, entertainment, and media ===
- Toxic (graffiti artist) (born 1965), US
- Toxic (2008 film), a thriller film
- Toxic (2024 film), a Lithuanian drama film
- Toxic (2026 film), an Indian film by Geetu Mohandas
- Toxic (magazine), a British boys' magazine and comic, 2000s
- Toxic!, a 1990s British comic
- Toxic TV, a Serbian television channel

== See also ==
- Toxik, an American thrash metal band
- Toxikk, a 2015 video game
