= Patrice Tonda =

Gabonese politician and diplomat

Patrice Tonda is a Gabonese politician and diplomat. He served in the government of Gabon as Minister of Housing from 2007 to 2008 and then as Minister of Trade and Industrial Development, in charge of NEPAD, from 2008 to 2009.

== Early career and teaching ==
Tonda is an engineer with a degree in experimental physics. After working at a uranium mining company as Deputy Director-General beginning in 1981, he was appointed as a special adviser on mining to President Omar Bongo in 1988, and he was professor of industrial economics at the Institut National Supérieur de Gestion, part of the University of Libreville, from 1989 to 1990. Subsequently he worked in Belgium as the CEO of Wongo International and professor of experimental physics at l'Athénée Royal d'Ath from 1991 to 1993.

== Diplomatic career ==
Tonda became Gabon's Ambassador to Senegal in 1996, and in 1997 he was additionally accredited as Ambassador to Cape Verde, Guinea-Bissau, The Gambia, and Guinea. He was appointed as Permanent Representative of Gabon to the United Nations at Geneva in 2003; while remaining Permanent Representative to the United Nations at Geneva, he was also appointed as Permanent Representative to United Nations Industrial Development Organization (UNIDO), based in Vienna, in 2006. He presented his credentials as Permanent Representative to UNIDO on 23 November 2006.

Following extended negotiations, the United Nations Human Rights Council appointed Tonda as one of six members of a team to investigate violence in Darfur in late January 2007. The composition of the team, which was headed by Jody Williams, was the result of a compromise between Western countries, which had a very critical view of the Sudanese government's actions, and African and Arab countries, which were more sympathetic to the Sudanese government. The members of the UN team were not given visas and therefore were forced to conduct their research using information available outside of Sudan. Sudan furiously denounced the team, and Tonda returned to Geneva during the team's futile wait for visas. He nevertheless remained part of the team.

== Political career ==
Tonda was appointed to the government of Gabon as Minister of Lodgings, Housing, and Urban Planning on 28 December 2007. He was then moved to the position of Minister of Trade and Industrial Development, in charge of NEPAD, on 7 October 2008.

Bongo died in June 2009. After Bongo's son, Ali Bongo Ondimba, won the 30 August 2009 presidential election, Tonda was dismissed from the government on 17 October 2009. He was then appointed as Chairman of the Board of Gabon Telecom on 19 October 2009.
