= Tonia =

Tonia may refer to:

- Tonia, Lesser Poland Voivodeship
- Tonia, Greater Poland Voivodeship
- Tonia (singer) (born 1947), Belgian singer
- Tonia (name)

== See also ==
- Teladoma tonia (T. tonia) a moth species
- Latonia (disambiguation)
- Tonya (disambiguation)
- Tania (disambiguation)
- Tanja (disambiguation)
- Tanya (disambiguation)
- Tonina (disambiguation)
