= Toga (surname) =

Toga is a surname. Notable people with this name include:

- Apisai Toga (1942 or 1945–1973), Fijian rugby union and rugby league player
- Arthur W. Toga, American neuroscientist
- Illiesa Toga (born 1965), Fijian former rugby league footballer
- Inisai Toga (fl. 1969–1974), Fijian rugby league footballer

== See also ==
- Teshome Toga (born 1968), Ethiopian politician
