= Tonka (name) =

Tonka is a Croatian, Slovene and Slovak feminine given name that is a diminutive form of Antonia and Antonija used in Croatia and Slovenia, as well as a nickname. Notable people with this name include:

== Given name ==
- Tonka Obretenova (1812 – 1893), known as Baba Tonka, Bulgarian revolutionary
- Tonka Petrova (born 1947), Bulgarian middle-distance athlete
- Tonka Tomicic (born 1976), Chilean model
- Tonka Wojahn (born 1975), Bulgarian-born German politician

== Nickname/Stage name ==
- Terell H. "Tonka" Hemingway (born 2001), American football player
- DJ Tonka, stage name of Thomas-René Gerlach (born 1973), male German electronic music artist.
- Tonka, nickname of Paul Chapman (musician) (1954–2020), Welsh rock guitarist
- Tonka, nickname of Ray Stewart (Scottish footballer) (born 1959), male Scottish footballer

== Surname ==
- Hubert Tonka (born 1943), French sociologist and urban planner

== Fictional characters ==
- Tonka, nickname of Kevin Tonkinson, Mike Bassett: Manager character
- Tonka, James Corden character in Twenty Four Seven, 1997 British film

== See also ==
- Tonka (disambiguation)
- Tonka, given name of Bully XIX (2000 – 2011), Mississippi State Bulldogs mascot (2001 – 2009), English Bulldog
- Donka (name)
- Tona (name)
- Tonda (name)
- Tonga (name)
- Tonja (name)
- Tonko
- Tonia (name)
- Tonra, a surname
- Tonya (given name)
