= Tanja Bogosavljević =

Serbian handball player (born 1989)

Personal information
- Nationality: Serbian
- Born: April 24, 1989 (age 37) Belgrade, Serbia
- Height: 1.76 m (5 ft 9 in)

Sport
- Sport: Handball
- Position: Back
- Current club: Muratpaşa Bld. SK
- Number: 7
National team
- Years: Team
- –: Serbia

Tanja Bogosavljević (born Serbian Cyrillic: тања Богосављевић; April 24, 1989) is a Serbian handballer playing in the Turkish Women's Handball Super League for Muratpaşa Bld. SK and the Serbia national team. The 1.76 m (5 ft 9 in)-tall sportswoman is playing in the back position.

She played for HC BMS Milenium in her country before she transferred to the Antalya-based team Muratpaşa Bld. SK in July 2015.
