= Rafel Tona =

Spanish painter (1903–1987)

Rafel Tona (24 June 1903, in Spain – 12 February 1987, in Paris, France) was a Spanish painter. His father was a lawyer and vice-president of the regional government of Catalonia.

== Education ==
Tona attended the School of Art in Barcelona in 1917, where he studied drawing, painting and sculpture with the sculptor Josep Llimona. In 1923, during a stay in Paris, he attended painting classes at the "Académie Charpentier".

== Work ==
In 1920 Tona worked in the studio of the sculptor Pau Gargallo and created drawings for the satirical newspaper Papitu.

Tona, along with Catalan painter Alfred Figueras, moved to Algiers in 1925 and established an Arts Academy where they taught painting, sculpture and drawing. In 1928 he returned to Paris spent his time painting and working on the movie sets in Joinville’s studios, where he helped create the sets for Pagnol and Korda's Marius and Pabst's L'Opéra de quat'sous.

== Spanish Civil War and World War 2 ==
After the Second Republic was proclaimed in Spain in 1932, Tona returned to Barcelona and opened an advertising agency. Around 1936 he was actively contributing to the republican movement by drawing propaganda posters. In 1939 he became a refugee from the Spanish Civil War and returned to France before moving on to Algeria after Germany's invasion.

In Algiers, Tona was dedicated to the Resistance and participated in the organisation of the Allies' landings in 1942. Along with painter Louis Bernasconi he set up the "Salons de la Résistance" in North Africa to raise money for the movement. He also contributed to the newspaper Combat and the Allies' propaganda (with posters and flyers). It was at this time that Tona established strong friendships with Albert Camus, René Capitant, Max-Pol Fouchet, René-Jean Clot, Jean Brune and Jean Amrouche.

== Later life ==
From 1944 to 1947 Tona exhibited his work in Algeria, Morocco, Tunisia and Paris. His exhibition in the "Champion-Cordier" gallery in Paris in 1946 was sponsored by Albert Marquet who also gave him lodgings in this studio in La Frette-Montigny.

His work featured in various exhibitions and art shows in Algiers from 1948 to 1960. He received the "Prix de la critique" in 1950 and the "Prix du Salon de La France d'Outre-Mer" in 1952. During this time, the Art Museum of Algiers bought several of his paintings.

In 1960 Tona returned to live in Paris where the supported himself with his paintings and sculptures. He organised many exhibitions of his work in France and abroad. Several of his paintings where acquired by the Art Museum of Toulouse in 1965 and the National Fund for Contemporary Art in 1980. He died in Paris on 12 February 1987.

== Exhibitions ==
- 1940 : Galerie Pompadour, Algiers, Algeria
- 1943 : Galerie 42, Tunis, Tunisia
- 1944 : Galerie Paul Colin, Algiers, Algeria
- 1946 : Galerie Champion-Cordier, Paris, France
- 1947 : Galerie Française, Casablanca, Morocco
- 1948 : Galerie Paul Colin, Algiers, Algeria
- 1950 : Galerie Robert Martin, Oran, Algeria
- 1951 : Galerie du Livre, Casablanca, Morocco
- 1952 : Galerie du Nombre d’Or, Algiers, Algeria
- 1955 : Galerie du Nombre d’Or, Algiers, Algeria
- 1956 : Galerie du Nombre d’Or, Algiers, Algeria
- 1957 : Galerie Comte-Tinchant, Algiers, Algeria
- 1959 : Galerie Comte-Tinchant, Algiers, Algeria
- 1961 : Galerie 106, Algiers, Algeria
- 1962 : Galerie Gérard Mourgue à Paris
- 1962 : Galerie Gérard Mourgue, Paris, France
- 1963 : Galerie Gérard Mourgue, Paris, France
- 1964 : Galerie Chedel, Geneva, Switzerland (group exhibition)
- 1964 : Galerie Sonnegh, Zürich, Switzerland
- 1964 : Galerie Marc Polony, Paris, France
- 1965 : Galerie Maurice Oeuillet, Toulouse, France
- 1966 : Galerie Gérard Mourgue, Paris, France
- 1968 : Galerie l'Indifférent à Lyon, France
- 1968 : GSala Rovira, Barcelona, Spain
- 1969 : Galerie Sainte Croix à Tours, France
- 1969 : Galerie du Centre, La Baule, France
- 1970 : Musée Néo-Calédonien, Nouméa, New Caledonia
- 1971 : Galerie Vauban, Dijon, France
- 1971 : Galerie Cohen, New York, USA (group exhibition)
- 1972 : Musée Néo-Calédonien, Nouméa, New Caledonia
- 1974 : Sala Rovira, Barcelona, Spain
- 1976 : Galerie des Amis des Arts à Aix-en-Provence, France
- 1977 : Galerie André Weil, Paris, France
- 1978 : Galerie des Maîtres Contemporains, Aix-en-Provence, Paris
- 1980 : Sala Rovira, Barcelona, Spain
- 1981 : Galerie Agora 3, Sitges, Spain
- 1982 : Chapelle de la Salpêtrière, Paris, France (group exhibition)
- 1985 : Galerie de l’Orangerie, Neuchâtel, Switzerland
- 1996 : Galerie Australe, Nouméa, New Caledonia
- 2003 : Musée des Beaux Arts de Bordeaux, France (group exhibition featuring l’Ecole d’Alger collection from the Musée National des Beaux Arts d’Alger)
- 2006 : Musée d’Art et d’Histoire, Narbonne, France (permanent collection)

== Sources ==
- Elisabeth Cazenave, Les artistes de l'Algérie, Ed. Bernard Giovanangeli, 2001
- Jaume Miratvitlles, Josep Termes, et Carles Fontserè, Carteles de la Republica y de la Guerra Civil, Ed. La Gaya Ciencia, 1978
- Edmon Vallès, Historia grafica de la Catalunya autonoma - La Guerra (1936-1939), Ed. 62, 1978
- Marion Vidal-Bué, Alger et ses peintres, Ed. Paris-Méditerranée, 2000
