= John Toner (physicist) =

American physicist (born 1955)

- Born: October 12, 1955; Mineola, New York, United States
- Education: MIT; Harvard University
- Awards: Lars Onsager Prize; Simons Fellow in Theoretical Physics; Gutzwiller Fellow at Max Planck Institute
- Scientific career
- Fields: Condensed matter physics
- Workplaces: University of Chicago (postdoc); Thomas J. Watson Research Center; University of Oregon
- Thesis: Defects and Other Topological Effects on Phase Transitions in Solids, Liquid Crystals, He3 Films, and Magnetic Systems
- Doctoral advisor: David Robert Nelson
- Website: https://cas.uoregon.edu/directory/physics/all/jjt

John Joseph Toner (born October 12, 1955) is an American physicist and professor emeritus at the University of Oregon in Eugene, Oregon. Toner's broad interests in condensed matter physics span the gamut from topics in "statistical physics and the hydrodynamics of systems ranging from hard to soft condensed matter and from passive to active systems".

== Education and career ==
Toner earned a bachelor's degree in mathematics from Massachusetts Institute of Technology in 1977. He did post-baccalaureate work in physics at Harvard University earning a master's degree in 1979 and a doctorate in 1981. After his PhD Toner was the James Franck Postdoctoral Fellow at the James Franck Institute, University of Chicago, 1981–-1983. From 1983 he was at IBM's Thomas J. Watson Research Center. In 1985 and 1993 he was a visiting researcher at the University of Bordeaux, CNRS, in Bordeaux, France. He has been researching and teaching at the University of Oregon since 1995. He retired from full-time teaching in December 2023.

== Research and innovation ==
In 1995, with Yuhai Tu, he created what are known as the Toner–Tu equations for swarm behavior (more precisely for collective behavior of self-propelled objects that follow the behavior of their neighbors as they move). They combined properties of the Navier–Stokes equations of the hydrodynamics of compressible fluids with simple spin models of ferromagnets and found a failure of the linearized hydrodynamic equations triggered by strong fluctuations. In contrast, their equation was able to predict the scaling exponents in the limiting case of long wavelengths. An important point is the movement of the individual objects. If one asks a large collection of people arranged in two dimensions, each of whom can only see a few nearest neighbors, to all point in the same direction, they could not do so (this is the Mermin-Wagner theorem). However, they can all walk in the same direction. The Toner–Tu equations are applicable, for example, to swarms of birds and fish, bacteria, molecular motors in cells, cancer cells and, as a model demonstration, collections of small plastic rods moving in the same direction on a vibrating table.

In addition to this phase described by the Toner–Tu equation, there are other phases of active matter that Toner studies theoretically (for example, a phase corresponding to liquid crystal layers, smectic P). In the incompressible case (constant density) this corresponds to a smectic liquid crystal in equilibrium, which in turn can be described by the KPZ equation (which is mostly used to describe interfaces). He also dealt with the reaction of swarms (herds) to external influences and on disordered surfaces and in disordered media.

With Niladri Sarkar and Abhik Basu, Toner developed the hydrodynamic theory of flocking at a solid-liquid interface. This theory has many applications to crucial movements inside the body including how carpets of cilia lining the interior of fallopian tubes give sperm a boost swimming up the tubes and how mucus is removed from the lungs.

In addition to formulating the Toner–Tu equations, Toner has made contributions to a wide range of areas of condensed matter physics, including the theory of melting, quasicrystals, fluctuating membranes, and disordered superconductors.

== Recognition ==
In 2006 Toner was elected a Fellow of the American Physical Society "for a wealth of contributions to the theory of correlations, fluctuations, topological defects, and anomalous elasticity and hydrodynamics of partially ordered phases."

In 2021 Toner was chosen a Simons Fellow in Theoretical Physics by the Simons Foundation.

In 2020 he received the Lars Onsager Prize with Yuhai Tu and Tamás Vicsek.

In 2019–-20 he was a Gutzwiller Fellow at the Max Planck Institute for the Physics of Complex Systems in Dresden.

== Selected publications ==
- Toner, J.,Long-Range Order in a Two-Dimensional Dynamical Model: How Birds Fly Together, Phys. Rev. Lett., Vol. 75, 1995, p. 4326
- Toner, J. and Tu, Y. Flocks, herds, and schools: A quantitative theory of flocking, Phys. Rev. E, Vol. 58, 1998, p. 4828,
- Toner, J. and Ramaswamy, S., Hydrodynamics and phases of flocks, Annals of Physics, Vol. 318, 2005, S. 170–244
- Toner, J. The Physics of Flocking: Birth, Death, and Flight in Active Matter, Cambridge University Press; 2024.
