= LaTonya =

La Tonya or LaTonya is a feminine African-American given name from the root name Antonius used in the United States. Notable people with this name include the following:

- LaTonya Goffney, American superintendent
- La Tonya Johnson (born 1972), American politician
- LaTonya Johnson (born 1975), American basketball player
- LaTonya Sims (born 1979), American basketball player
- LaTonya Swann (born 1991), American dancer

== See also ==
- LaTanya
- Latona (disambiguation)
- Latonia (disambiguation)
- Latoya (given name)
