= USS Latona =

Cargo ship of the United States Navy

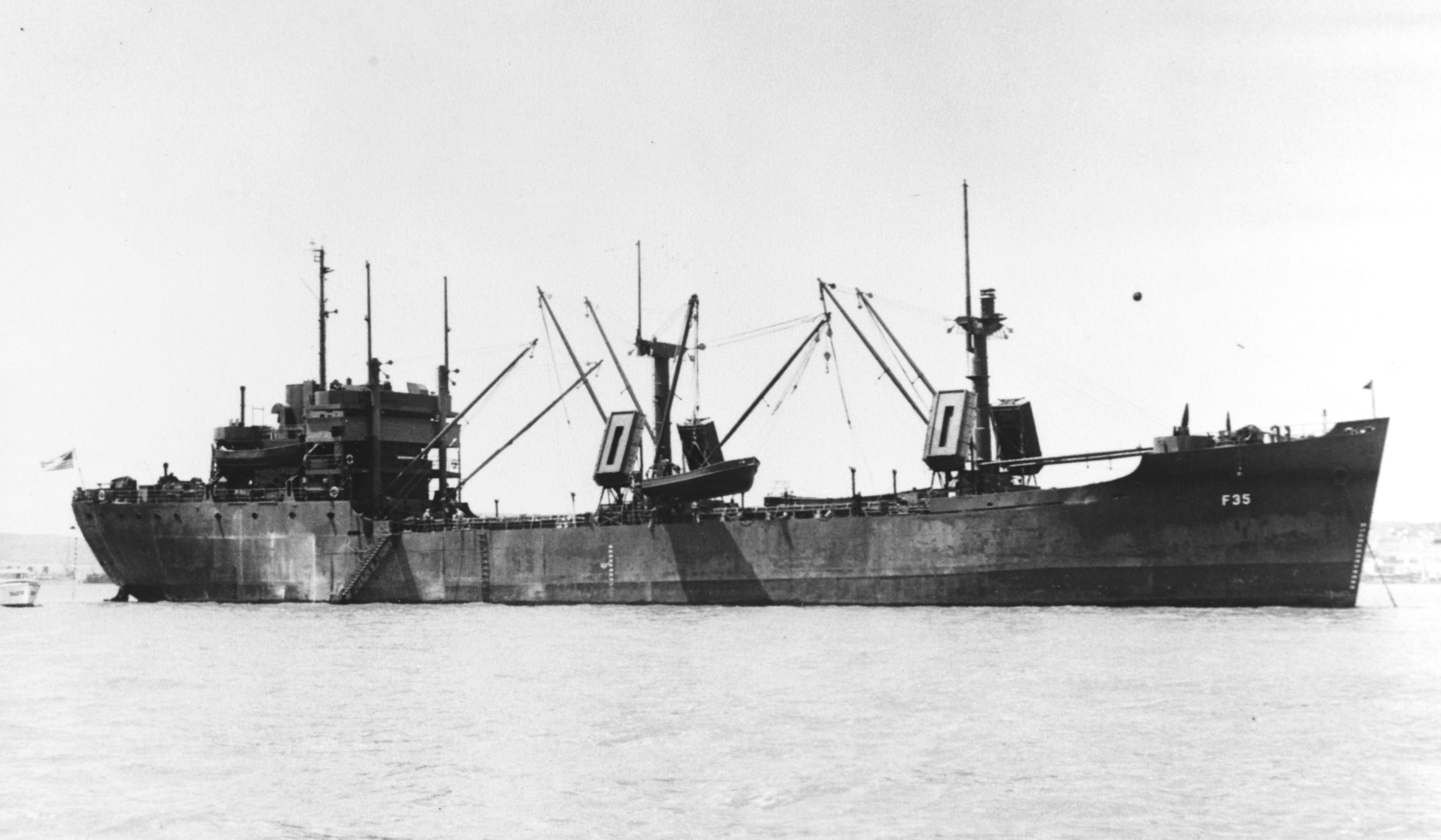

History

United States
- Ordered: as R1-M-AV3 hull, MC hull 2199
- Laid down: date unknown
- Launched: 10 August 1944
- Acquired: 31 January 1945
- Commissioned: 25 February 1945
- Decommissioned: 15 April 1949
- Stricken: date unknown
- Fate: Scrapped in 1973

General characteristics
- Tonnage: 2,120 long tons deadweight (DWT)
- Displacement: 3,139 t.(lt) 6,240 t.(fl)
- Length: 338 ft (103 m)
- Beam: 50 ft (15 m)
- Draught: 18 ft (5.5 m)
- Propulsion: diesel engine, single screw, 1,700shp
- Speed: 12 kts. (max)
- Complement: 84
- Armament: one single 3 in (76 mm) dual purpose gun mount, six single 20 mm gun mounts

USS Latona (AF-35) was an Adria-class stores ship in service with the United States Navy from 1945 to 1949. She was scrapped in 1973.

== History ==
Latona was launched under United States Maritime Commission contact 10 August 1944 by Pennsylvania Shipyards, Inc., Beaumont, Texas; sponsored by Mrs. Claude Frazier; acquired by the Navy 31 January 1945; and commissioned 25 February 1945 at Houston, Texas.

=== World War II ===
Departing Galveston, Texas, 15 March, Latona loaded dry and refrigerated cargo at Mobile, Alabama, transited the Panama Canal, and arrived Pearl Harbor 17 April. Assigned to Service Squadron 8, she sailed 28 April for the western Pacific Ocean. She reached Ulithi, western Carolines, 14 May, joined Service Squadron 10, and departed in convoy 15 May for the Ryūkyūs. She arrived Kerama Retto 21 May. Despite frequent air alerts, she completed unloading cargo 30 May.

=== Post-war activity ===
Latona departed Kerama Retto 31 May. Steaming via Ulithi, she arrived Pearl Harbor 24 June, loaded fleet provisions, then returned to Ulithi 4 to 21 July. She proceeded to Okinawa 25 July to 4 August, unloaded her cargo at Buckner Bay, and departed 17 August for New Zealand. Sailing via Ulithi and Manus, Admiralties, she arrived Auckland 10 September. After loading refrigerated cargo, she steamed to Guam 19 September to 4 October. Over the next month she transported provisions to bases in the Marianas and on Iwo Jima before returning to Pearl Harbor 18 November with 64 military passengers embarked. After making a supply run to Wake Island and the Marshalls between 1 December and 12 January 1946, she sailed to the U.S. West Coast, where she arrived San Pedro, California, 2 February.

Loaded with fleet provisions, Latona departed for the Far East 19 February. During a period of almost 3 years, she made nine deployments to bases scattered throughout the western and central Pacific, including five supply runs to the Marshalls and Marianas, and four to the Far East. While serving in the Far East, she transported dry and refrigerated cargo from Subic Bay, Manila Bay, and Leyte Gulf In the Philippines to Japan and China. Between 16 August 1946 and 21 November 1948 she steamed on four occasions to Qingdao, Shanghai, and Chinwangtao, China, to provision ships supporting the Nationalist government operations in mainland China.

=== Decommissioning and fate ===
Latona departed Qingdao 21 November and arrived Oakland, California, 12 December. She entered Mare Island Navy Yard 22 December and decommissioned there 15 April 1949. She was returned to the War Shipping Administration and entered the National Defense Reserve Fleet. She was placed in reserve at Suisun Bay, California and struck from the Naval Vessel Register (date unknown). Final Disposition: scrapped in 1973.

== Military awards and honors ==
Latona received one battle star for World War II service. Her crew was eligible for the following medals:

- China Service Medal (extended)
- American Campaign Medal
- Asiatic–Pacific Campaign Medal (1)
- World War II Victory Medal
- Navy Occupation Service Medal (with Asia clasp)
