= LaTanya =

LaTanya is an African-American feminine given name from the root name Tatianus used in the United States. It is similar to the name Tanya. Notable people with this name include the following:

- LaTanya Garrett, U.S. politician
- LaTanya Richardson Jackson (born 1949), U.S. actress
- LaTanya Sheffield (born 1963), U.S. athlete
- Latanya Sweeney, U.S. computer scientist
- LaTanya Chantella White, (born 1982), U.S. basketball player known as Tan White

== See also ==
- Latania, plant genus
- LaTonya, given name
- Lavanya (name)
