= HMS Latona =

Four ships of the Royal Navy have borne the name HMS Latona, after the Romanised name of the character Leto, of Greek mythology:

- HMS Latona (1781) was a 38-gun fifth rate launched in 1781. She was used for harbour service from 1813 and was sold in 1816.
- HMS Latona (1821) was a 46-gun fifth rate launched in 1821, put up for sale in 1869 and broken up by 1875.
- HMS Latona (1890) was an Apollo-class protected cruiser launched in 1890. She was used as minelayer in 1907 and was sold in 1920.
- HMS Latona (M76) was an Abdiel-class minelayer launched in 1940 and sunk in 1941.
