= Tania (artist) =

American sculptor (1920-1982)

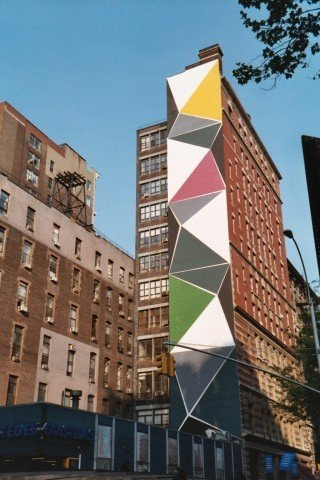
- Wall painting by Tania at Mercer and Third Streets in Greenwich Village, Manhattan, New York
- Born: Tatiana Lewin; January 11, 1920; Łódź, Poland
- Died: January 24, 1982 (aged 62); Brooklyn, New York, United States
- Known for: painting, sculpture, collage, wall painting
- Movement: Geometric abstraction, Hard-edge painting, Public art, Pop art

Tania (born Tatiana Lewin; January 11, 1920 – January 24, 1982) was a Polish-born Jewish American abstract painter, sculptor, collage artist and painter of city walls.

She was active in the New York art world from 1949 to 1982, but is perhaps best known for her 13-story geometric wall painting of 1970, which still stands at the corner of Mercer and Third Streets in Greenwich Village, Manhattan, New York. In 1966, she became a founding member of City Walls, Inc., a non-profit organization that commissioned abstract artists to paint walls around New York City, and which (when consolidated with the Public Arts Council in 1977) later became the Public Art Fund.

== Early life and education ==
Tania was born in 1920 in Warsaw, Poland, to Mischa (Michael) and Rosalia (Rose) Lewin. Around 1931, the family emigrated to Paris, where Tania spent the rest of her childhood. The family fled to Montréal, Canada in 1941 following Germany's invasion of France. There, Tania received a Master of Arts from McGill University before relocating to New York City with her parents in 1943. She began a PhD in French Literature at Columbia University, but left the program with ABD status. In 1949, she began courses at the Art Students League of New York, where she studied painting with Yasuo Kuniyoshi, Morris Kantor and Vaclav Vytlacil.

== Career ==
Over the course of her career, Tania worked in a number of styles before settling on her characteristic geometric abstract style featuring hard-edged triangles. Her early paintings from the late 1940s evidence the influence of her teacher Yasuo Kuniyoshi, both in terms of their subject matter and color palette. In her student years, she exhibited in juried student exhibitions at the Art Students' League. In 1951, she was included in a group show of newcomers at the Creative Gallery. From 1954 to 1958, she made a living designing wallpaper, fabrics and carpets while raising her young children.

Tania had her first "one-man show" at Albert Landry Gallery in 1959. She asked Ad Reinhardt to help her hang the show. Through the early 1960s, she worked primarily in collage and assemblage. This phase featured abstract collages of corrugated cardboard and paint as well as more heavily Pop-influenced collages and wood assemblages featuring signage, advertising and other found materials. She exhibited several of these colorful wood sculptures in her 1963 solo show at Bertha Schaefer Gallery under the name "Color Structures." During this time, Tania also exhibited what she called her "complementary paintings," works comprising two abutted canvases. These "complementary" (or "binary" works) typically combined collaged canvases with monochrome ones. In a related set of works on paper, she mounted collages opposite her own poetry in French. Her 1961 show at Landry Gallery included complementary paintings and corrugated board collages, but also several large-scale "environments." In 1962, sponsored by Ad Reinhardt, Philip Pearlstein and Pandolfini, she was elected as a member of The Artists' Club. She began teaching at New York University in 1963.

Two drawings housed in the collection of the Metropolitan Museum of Art show that Tania had arrived at her geometric style at least by 1967. She produced paintings and prints featuring variations on her characteristic "overlapping triangles" composition. In this period, she also produced large-scale aluminum sculptures that translated the overlapping triangles composition into multi-planar, three-dimensional form. Examples of this type of sculpture can be seen in the Kingsborough Community College Marine & Academic Center building in Brooklyn and on the library at Albright College in Reading, PA. In a statement from 1978, Tania likened her triangles to rooftops, seen from above: "For a few years now I have been thinking of my paintings (always executed on the floor) as roof tops seen from the air – in the clouds – in the sun – in the night. The paintings have become sketches for buildings planned from the top down...The Spiral Jetty of Smithson could be done in the City."

From roughly 1966, when she co-founded City Walls Inc., Tania had begun to devote much of her energy to public and outdoor art projects. With the sponsorship of City Walls, she painted walls at Evergreen & Weirfield Aves in Brooklyn (1968), Bryant & Lafayette Aves in the Bronx (1968), and at Mercer & 3rd St. in Manhattan (1970), but only the Manhattan wall remains. In 1972, she collaborated with Nassos Daphnis to produce a temporary "environment in process" by painting various surfaces at the construction site of a high-rise in Times Square—from the building's skeleton, to the surrounding plywood scaffolding, to construction workers' shoes and toolboxes.

Tania commented in her writings about the difficulty of being a woman artist who painted geometric abstractions. In one unpublished autobiographical text she writes, "My paintings were 'too large for a woman,' said the New York Times ...I painted like a man... I guess I was supposed to paint flowers."

== Select exhibitions ==
- Creative Gallery, New York, 1951
- Albert Landry Gallery, New York, 1959 (Including: "Waters Can Be Islands, No. 3")
- Albert Landry Gallery, New York, 1961 (complementary paintings, cardboard collages, and largescale environments)
- Albert Landry Gallery, New York, 1962
- "Tania," Bertha Schaefer Gallery, New York, 1963 (Including: "Look Me Over," collage)
- Contemporary American Painting and Sculpture, Krannert Art Museum, University of Illinois, 1963 (Featured work: "SG7," painting/collage)

with Milton Avery, James Brooks, Stuart Davis, Jane Freilicher, Adolph Gottlieb, Grace Hartigan, Ellsworth Kelly, Louise Nevelson, Ben Shahn, Hedda Sterne, Esteban Vicente, and others

- "Tania: Color Structures," Bertha Schaefer Gallery, New York, 1964
- Whitney Biennial, Whitney Museum, New York, 1964 (Featured work: "S Begins," wood sculpture)
- "Formalists" at the Washington Gallery of Modern Art, 1963 (Featured work: "Exp," collage)

with Josef Albers, Will Barnet, Nassos Daphnis, Ellsworth Kelly, Agnes Martin, Ad Reinhardt, Frank Stella, and others.

- "Using Walls" Special Exhibition at The Jewish Museum, New York, 1970

The Museum featured a plywood mural by Tania on its façade for the length of the exhibition

- "Painting for City Walls," Museum of Modern Art, New York, 1969
- "Artists of the Hamptons Paintings & Sculpture," Auction to Benefit Guild Hall, East Hampton, NY, 1975 (Featured work: "4 Pyramids Red," painting)

with Perle Fine, Adolph Gottlieb, Howard Kanovitz, Elaine de Kooning, Willem de Kooning, Lee Krasner, Ibram Lassaw, John Opper, Ray Parker, Ray Prohaska, Syd Solomon, Saul Steinberg, Hedda Sterne, Esteban Vicente, Andy Warhol, and others.

- "Vaclav Vytlacil: Paintings and Constructions from 1930," featuring works by Vytlacil and his students, Montclair Art Museum, Montclair, New Jersey, 1975–76

with Louise Bourgeois, Robert Rauschenberg, Tony Smith, Cy Twombly, and others.

- Solo retrospective at Jack Gallery, New York, 1978

== Collections ==
Tania's works can be found in the following public collections:

- Albright College, Reading, PA
- Barnard College, Manhattan, NY
- Kingsborough Community College, Brooklyn, NY
- The Metropolitan Museum of Art, Manhattan, NY
- Morgan State College, Baltimore, MD
- New York University, Manhattan, NY
- Rose Art Museum, Brandeis University, Waltham, MA
- Godwin-Ternbach Museum, Queens College, Queens, NY

She also designed doors for a Torah ark (1966–67) that is still in use at the White Street Synagogue (or Synagogue for the Arts) in New York.

== Published resources ==
In order of publication date:

- Dore Ashton, "Art: An Image Elaborated," New York Times (October 7, 1959)
- Donald Judd, "Tania" (review), Arts Magazine 38, no. 6 (March 1964), 70 [Reprinted in Donald Judd, Complete Writings, 1959-1975 (Nova Scotia College of Art & Design, 2005)]
- Fred W. McDarrah, The Artist's World in Pictures. New York: E.P. Dutton, 1961
- Mel Bochner, "Tania" (review), Arts Magazine 40, no. 5 (March 1966), 68–69
- Harold C. Schonberg, "Someone There Is Who Loves a Wall," New York Times (Sunday, May 31, 1970), Real Estate section page 1 page 2
- Dore Ashton et al., Using Walls (Outdoors) The Jewish Museum (May 13-June 21, 1970), Exhibition Catalogue
- Dore Ashton. New York. London: Thames and Hudson, 1972
- Stern, Robert A. M.; Mellins, Thomas; Fishman, David (1995). New York 1960: Architecture and Urbanism Between the Second World War and the Bicentennial (1960 ed.). New York: Monacelli Press. ISBN 1-885254-02-4.
