= Tonic =

Tonic may refer to:

- Tonic water, a drink traditionally containing quinine
- Regional name for soft drink—a carbonated beverage, used in eastern Massachusetts and parts of Maine and New Hampshire.
- Tonic (physiology), the response of a muscle fiber or nerve ending typified by slow, continuous action
- Tonic syllable, the stressed syllable of a word
- Herbal tonic, a herbal medicine with tonic effects
- Tonic (music), the tonal center of a musical scale
- Tonic (band), an American rock band
- Tonic (Tonic album), 2010
- Tonic (music venue), a New York City music venue, 1998–2007
- Tonic (Medeski Martin & Wood album), 2000
- Tonic (radio program), Canadian radio program
- Tonic suit, a garment made from a shiny mohair blend that was fashionable among the Mods of the mid-1960s
- Tonic (film), a Bengali film

== See also ==
- Patent medicine that claims to have tonic properties
- Tonči
- Tonic sol-fa, a method of teaching sight-singing
- Tonic Sol-fa (a cappella group), American singing group with a largely pop-music-oriented repertoire
- Tonie, name
- Tonio (name)
