= Tonino =

Tonino is an Italian and Spanish given name, surname or nickname. As a given name it is a diminutive form of Antonio in use in Italy, Spain, parts of the United States, Mexico, Cuba, Dominican Republic, Guatemala, Honduras, El Salvador, Nicaragua, Costa Rica, Western Panama, Colombia, Venezuela, Peru, Ecuador, Bolivia, Chile, Paraguay, Argentina, Uruguay, and the Falkland Islands. Notable people with this name include the following:

== People ==
- Tonino Accolla (born 1949), Italian actor
- Tonino Baliardo, French guitarist (Gipsy Kings)
- Tonino Benacquista (born 1961), French author
- Tonino Carotone (born 1970), Spanish singer
- Tonino Cervi (1929-2002), Italian film director and producer
- Tonino Delli Colli (1922-2005), Italian cinematographer
- Tonino Guerra (1920–2012), Italian writer and concentration camp survivor
- Tonino Martino (born 1969), Italian footballer
- Tonino Picula (born 1961), Croatian politician
- Tonino Sorrentino (born 1985), Italian footballer
- Tonino Valerii (born 1934), Italian film director
- Tonino Viali (1960), Italian runner
- Daniel Pérez Moreno (a.k.a. "Tonino") (born 1981), Spanish footballer

== Other ==
- Don Tonino, Italian television series
- Stadio Tonino Benelli, football stadium in Pesaro, Italy

== See also ==
- Tony (disambiguation), the English equivalent of Tonino
- Tonina (disambiguation)
- Tonio (name)
- Toñito (name)
- Toto (disambiguation), another diminutive of Antonio
