= Tonja (name) =

Tonja is an English and Slovene feminine given name that is considered to be a short form of Antonija. Notable people with that name include the following:

- Tonja Buford-Bailey (born 1970), American hurdles athlete
- Tonja Christensen (born 1971), American model, actress and Playboy Playmate
- Tonja Walker (born 1960), American actress and singer

== See also ==
- Tanja (disambiguation)
- Tinja (disambiguation)
- Tona (name)
- Tonda (name)
- Tonga (name)
- Tonia (name)
- Tonka (name)
- Tonna (disambiguation)
- Tonra (surname)
- Tonya (given name)
