= Toni =

- Gender: Unisex

Origin
- Origin: Antonius, Antonio, Anton, Antonia Antoinette

Toni, Toñi or Tóni is a unisex given name used in several European countries as well as among individuals with ancestry from these countries outside Europe.

In Spanish, Italian, Croatian and Finnish, it is a masculine given name used as a short form of the names derived from Antonius like Antonio, Ante or Anttoni. (Note: Used in parts of Norway and Sweden, Finland, Estonia, Republic of Karelia, Spain, parts of the United States, Mexico, Guatemala, Honduras, El Salvador, Nicaragua, Costa Rica, Western Panama, Cuba, Dominican Republic, Colombia, Venezuela, Peru, Ecuador, Bolivia, Chile, Paraguay, Argentina, Uruguay, Brazil, and the Falkland Islands.)

In Danish, English, Norwegian and Swedish, it is a feminine given name used as a short form of Antonia. (Note: Used in Finland, Denmark, Sweden, Norway, Republic of Karelia, Estonia, Greenland, United States, Canada, Mexico, Australia, New Zealand, Papua New Guinea, the Philippines, Peninsular Malaysia, India, Pakistan, England, Scotland, Wales, Northern Ireland, Republic of Ireland, Guyana, Liberia, Sierra Leone, Ghana, Namibia, South Africa, Botswana, Zimbabwe, Zambia, Malawi, Tanzania, Uganda, Kenya, Sudan, South Sudan, Ethiopia, Cameroon and Nigeria.)

In Bulgarian, it is a name used by both sexes as a diminutive form of both Antoniya and Anton. It is also used by both sexes in German: Anton, Antonius; Antonia, Antoinette.

Toñi is a Spanish feminine given name used as a short form of Antonia. (Note: Used in Spain, parts of the United States, Mexico, Guatemala, Honduras, El Salvador, Nicaragua, Costa Rica, Western Panama, Cuba, Dominican Republic, Colombia, Venezuela, Peru, Ecuador, Bolivia, Chile, Paraguay, Argentina, Uruguay, Brazil, and the Falkland Islands.)

Tóni a Hungarian masculine given name used as a diminutive form of Antal. (Note: Used in Hungary and parts of Romania.)

It is sometimes a short form (hypocorism) of other names, such as Antonio, Antoine, Antonia or Antoinette. Toni is also a surname.

Notable people with this given name include:

== People ==
=== Women ===
- Toni Adams (1964–2010), American wrestling manager
- Toni Arden (1924–2012), stage name of Antoinette Ardizzone, US singer
- Toni Aubin (1927–1990), American vocalist
- Toni Basil, stage name of American singer and actress Antonia Christina Basilotta (born 1943)
- Toni Blum (1918–1973), American writer
- Toni Braxton (born 1966), American singer-songwriter and actress
- Toni Cade Bambara (1939–1995), African-American writer and professor
- Toni Carabillo (1926–1997), American graphic designer
- Toni Childs (born 1957), American singer-songwriter
- Toni Collette (born 1972), Australian actress
- Toni Cronk (born 1980), Australian field hockey goalkeeper
- Toni Darnay (1921–1983), American actress
- Toni Duggan (born 1991), English footballer
- Toni Edgar-Bruce (1892–1966), British actress
- Toni Elster (1861–1948), German painter
- Toni Fisher (1924–1999), American pop singer
- Toni Fowler (born 1993), Filipina actress
- Toni Frissell (1907–1988), American photographer
- Antonia Toni Garrn (born 1992), German model
- Celestine Toni Gonzaga (born 1984), Filipino singer and actress
- Toni Grant (1942–2016), American psychologist
- Toni Halliday (born 1964), English singer-songwriter in the duo Curve
- Toni Harp, American politician
- Toni Jo Henry (1916–1942), American murderer
- Toni Kasim (1966–2008), Malaysian politician
- Toni Kelner, American mystery writer
- Toni Lander (1931–1985), Danish dancer
- Toni Laites (born 2000), American television personality
- Toni LaSelle (1901–2002), American artist
- Toni Lawrence (born 1976), involved in the torture-murder of Shanda Sharer
- Toni Mannix (1906–1983), American actress
- Toni Martínez (born 1997), Spanish footballer
- Toni McNaron (born 1937), American literary scholar and lesbian memoirist
- Toni Mendez (1908–2003), American cartoonist
- Toni Morrison, pen-name of American writer and professor Chloe Ardelia Wofford (1931–2019)
- Toni Packer (1927–2013), American writer and teacher
- Toni Rettaliata (1944–2020), American politician
- Toni Rothmund (1877–1956), German writer
- Toni Sender (1888–1964), German politician
- Toni Shaw (born 2003), British Paralympic swimmer
- Toni Stone (1921–1996), American baseball player
- Toni Tennille (born 1940), American singer-songwriter
- Toni Tetzlaff (1871–1947), German film actress
- Toni van Eyck (1910–1988), German film actress
- Toni von Bukovics (1882–1970), Austrian film actress
- Toni von Langsdorff (1884–1976), German doctor
- Toni Weinstein, American politician
- Toni Williams, British legal scholar
- Toni Wolff (1888–1953), Swiss Jungian analyst

=== Men ===
- Toni Androić (born 1991), Croatian tennis player
- Toni Bürgler (born 1957), Swiss alpine skier
- Toni Dietl (born 1961), German karate practitioner
- Antinous Toni Dijan (born 1983), Croatian basketball player
- Toni Eggert, German luger
- Toni Gardemeister (born 1975), Finnish rally driver
- Toni Gorupec (born 1993), Croatian footballer
- Antonio Toni Jiménez Sistachs (born 1970), Spanish football player and coach
- Toni Junnila (born 1984), Finnish footballer
- Toni Kallio (born 1978), Finnish footballer
- Toni Keränen (born 1998), Finnish javelin thrower
- Toni Kolehmainen (born 1988), Finnish footballer
- Toni Korkeakunnas (born 1968), Finnish football player and manager
- Toni Kroos (born 1990), German footballer
- Toni Kuivasto (born 1975), Finnish footballer
- Toni Kukoč (born 1968), Croatian basketball player
- Toni Lechuga (born 1988), Spanish football player
- Toni Liias (born 1986), Finnish racing cyclist
- Antoni Lima (born 1970), Andorran footballer nicknamed "Toni"
- António Toni Lopes (born 1979), Portuguese footballer
- Toni Maalouf, Lebanese actor
- Toni Mascolo (1942–2017), British hairdresser, co-founder of Toni & Guy
- Toni Micevski (born 1970), Macedonian footballer
- Toni Müller (born 1984), Swiss curler
- Antonio "Toni" Nadal Homar (born 1961), Spanish tennis coach, uncle of Rafael Nadal
- Toni Nieminen (born 1975), Finnish ski jumper
- António Toni Conceição (born 1961), Portuguese football coach and player
- Anton Toni Prijon, West German 1980s slalom canoer
- Toni Prostran (born 1991), Croatian basketball player
- Toni Rakkaen (born 1982), Thai model, actor and hair stylist
- Toni Rocak (born 1999), Swiss basketball player
- Antonio Toni Dovale (born 1990), Spanish footballer
- Anton Toni Sailer (1935–2009), Austrian skier
- Toni Savevski (born 1963), Macedonian footballer
- Toni Schuberl (born 1983), German politician
- Anton Schumacher (born 1938), German footballer
- Harald Anton Toni Schumacher (born 1954), German footballer
- Toni Söderholm (born 1978), Finnish ice hockey player
- Toni Ståhl (born 1984), Finnish footballer
- Toni Šunjić (born 1988), Bosnian footballer
- Toni Tasev (born 1994), Bulgarian footballer
- Toni Tipurić (born 1990), Bosnian footballer
- Antonio Toni Ucci (1922–2014), Italian actor and comedian
- Toni Vastić (born 1993), Austrian footballer
- Toni Vilander (born 1980), Finnish race car driver
- Toni Williams (1939–2016), Cook Island-born New Zealand pop singer
- Toni Wirtanen (born 1975), Finnish musician

== Fictional characters ==
- Toni Cipriani, in the Grand Theft Auto series
- Toni Daggert, on the British soap opera Emmerdale
- Toni Shalifoe, in the TV series The Wilds
- Toni Topaz, in the US TV series Riverdale
- Toni Warner, on the New Zealand soap opera Shortland Street

== See also ==
- Toni (disambiguation)
- Toni (surname)
- De Toni
- Tona (name)
- Tonči, a Croatian and Slovene masculine given name
- Tonie, a Swedish unisex given name and nickname
- Tonio (name)
- Tonni (name)
