= Ante (name) =

Ante is masculine given name found mainly in Croatia and in the Nordic countries or among people with Croatia and Nordic ancestry elsewhere.

Ante (pronounced [ǎːnte]) is a common Croatian name, among the top 100 names in Croatia, with over 30,000 bearers. In Croatia, the name Ante was among the top ten most common masculine given names in the decades up to 1959. It is cognate to the name Antun, in turn derived from the Roman gentile name Antonius. It started to spread through the veneration of Anthony the Great and esp. of Anthony of Padua. Other cognates include Anton, Antonije, Anto, Toni, Tonko, Tonči, Antonija, etc.

Ante is also a Swedish male first name, unrelated to the names that derive from Antonius, and instead is a diminutive form of Anders and Andreas.

Antė is the Lithuanian form of the name, a diminutive of Antanas, and to a lesser extent Anton, Antonio and Antonijo.

== Croatian etymology ==
- Ante Antić (1893–1956), Croatian Capuchin
- Ante Bukvić (born 1987), Croatian-Luxembourgish footballer
- Ante Covic (born 1975), Australian footballer of Croatian heritage
- Ante Čović (Croatian footballer) (born 1975), Croatian-German football manager
- Ante Delaš (born 1988), Croatian basketball player
- Ante Đugum (born 1988), Croatian basketball player
- Ante Erceg (born 1989), Croatian footballer
- Ante Garmaz (1928–2011), Croatian-born Argentine actor, fashion designer and model
- Ante Gotovina (born 1955), Croatian general
- Ante Jazić (born 1976), Canadian soccer player
- Ante Jelavić (born 1963), Bosnian-Croat politician
- Ante Juric (born 1973), Australian football
- Ante Kosovich (1879–1958), Croatian-New Zealand writer
- Ante Kovacevic (born 1974), Australian footballer
- Ante Kovačić (1854–1889), Croatian writer
- Ante Marković (1924–2011), Yugoslav-Croatian politician
- Ante Milanovic-Litre (born 1994), Canadian football player
- Ante Milicic (born 1974), Australian footballer
- Ante Miročević (born 1952), Montenegrin footballer
- Ante Mladinić (1929–2002), Croatian football manager
- Ante Moric (born 1974), Australian footballer
- Ante Mrduljaš (1910–1997), Yugoslav-Croatian politician
- Ante Nazor (basketball) (born 1978), Croatian basketball coach
- Ante Nazor (historian) (born 1968), Croatian historian
- Ante Pavelić (1869–1938), Croatian politician
- Ante Pavelić (1889–1959), Croatian politician and fascist leader
- Ante Peterlić (1936–2007), Croatian screenwriter and film director
- Ante Radonić (born 1951), Croatian astronomer
- Ante Razov (born 1974), American footballer
- Ante Rebić (born 1993), Croatian footballer
- Ante Roguljić (born 1996), Croatian footballer
- Ante Roje (1905–1980), Croatian swimmer
- Ante Šimundža (born 1971), Slovenian footballer
- Ante Tomić (basketball) (born 1987), Croatian basketball player
- Ante Tomić (writer) (born 1970), Croatian writer
- Ante Trstenjak (1894–1970), Slovenian, psychologist, painter and illustrator
- Ante Starčević (1823–1896), Croatian politician and writer
- Ante Šupuk (1838–1904), Croatian politician and inventor
- Ante Žanetić (1936–2014), Croatian footballer
- Ante Žižić (born 1997), Croatian basketball player

== Nordic people named Ante ==
- Ante Aikio (born 1977), Finnish-Sami linguist
- Ante Björkebaum (born 1988), Swedish footballer

== Other people ==
- Ante Zelck (born Andreas Zelck, 1963), German entrepreneur and hostel pioneer

== See also ==
- Ante (disambiguation)
- Ant (name)
- Antes (name)
- Anth (name)
