= Antonina (name) =

Feminine given name

Antonina and Antoņina are feminine given names and nicknames. It is a Bulgarian, Latin, Polish, Russian, and Ukrainian given name that is an alternate form of Antonia in use in Israel, Vietnam, Moldova, Bulgaria, Romania, Hungary, Slovakia, Czech Republic, Poland, Ukraine, Belarus, Lithuania, Latvia, Estonia, Georgia, Azerbaijan, Armenia, Russia, Mongolia, Kazakhstan, Kyrgyzstan, Uzbekistan, Turkmenistan, and Tajikistan. It is a Danish, Finnish, German, Italian, Norwegian and Swedish diminutive form of Antonia in use in Greenland, Finland, Norway, Sweden, Denmark, parts of the Republic of Karelia, Germany, Italy, Northern Estonia, Austria, eastern Switzerland, and parts of Romania and Hungary. Antoņina is a Latvian alternate form of Antonia in use in Latvia. Notable people with this name include the following:

== Given name ==
=== Arts ===
- Antonina Houbraken (1686–1736), Dutch draughtswoman
- Antonina Koptiaeva (1909–1991), Soviet novelist
- Antonina Kymytval (1938–2015), Russian writer
- Antonina Liedtke, Polish writer
- Antonina Niemiryczowa (1702–1780), Polish poet
- Antonina Riasanovsky (1895–1985), Russian author
- Antonina Rzhevskaya (1861–1934), Russian painter
- Antonina Żabińska (1908–1971), Polish writer and savior of Jews

=== Entertainment ===
- Antonina Abarinova (1842–1901), Russian opera singer
- Antonina Girycz (1939–2022), Polish actress
- Antonina Hoffmann (1842–1897), Polish theatre actress
- Antonina Komissarova (born 1986), Russian actress
- Antonina Krzysztoń (born 1954), Polish singer-songwriter
- Antonina Matviyenko (born 1981), Ukrainian singer
- Antonina Miliukova (1848–1917), wife of Russian composer Pyotr Ilyich Tchaikovsky
- Antonina Nezhdanova (1873–1950), Russian opera singer
- Antonina Prusinowska (fl. 1767), Polish stage actress
- Antonina Shuranova (1936–2003), Russian actress
- Antonina Szumowska, birthname of Antoinette Szumowska (1868–1938), Polish pianist

=== Military/War ===
- Antonina Grégoire (1914–1952) Belgian business engineer, feminist, communist, ran an intelligence gathering section in Belgian Partisans Armés resistance during Second World War.
- Antonina Khudyakova (1917–1998), Soviet Air Force officer
- Antonina Lebedeva (1916–1943), Soviet Air Force officer
- Antonina Makarova (1921–1979), Soviet war criminal
- Antonina Petrova (1915–1941), Soviet partisan and medic
- Antonina Tomaszewska (1814–1883), Polish noblewoman and rebel
- Antonina Wyrzykowska (1916–2011), Polish Righteous Among the Nations honoree
- Antonina Zubkova (1920–1950), Soviet Air Force officer

=== Politics ===
- Antonina Isaeva (born 1947), Ukrainian milkmaid and politician
- Antonina Kravchuk (born 1935), Ukrainian First Lady
- Antonina Parker (died 1997), American politician
- Antonina Stoyanova (born 1952), Bulgarian IP lawyer, diplomat and social activist, who was the Bulgarian First Lady
- Antonina Uccello (1922–2023), American politician

=== Science ===
- Antonina Borissova (1903–1970), Russian botanist
- Antonina Dvoryanets (1952–2014), Ukrainian hydraulic engineer and political activist
- Antonina Pirozhkova (1909–2010), Russian civil engineer
- Antonina Pojarkova (1897–1980), Russian botanist
- Antonina Prikhot'ko (1906–1995), Russian physicist
- Antonina Zernova (1883–1964), Russian book historian and bibliographer

=== Sports ===
- Antonina Dragašević (born 1948), Bulgarian chess player
- Antonina Dubinina (born 1996), Serbian figure skater
- Antonina Ivanova (1932–2006), Soviet shot putter
- Antonina Koshel (born 1954), Soviet artistic gymnast
- Antonina Krivoshapka (born 1987), Russian middle-distance athlete
- Antonina Latinik-Rieger (1906–1989), Polish fencer
- Antonina Lazareva (born 1941), Soviet high jump athlete
- Antonina Melnikova (born 1958), Belarusian canoer
- Antonina Nastoburko (born 1959), Ukrainian sprint athlete
- Antonina Ordina (born 1962), Swedish cross country skier
- Antonina Popova (born 1935), Soviet discus athlete
- Antonina Pustovit (born 1955), Ukrainian former rower
- Antonina Rubtsova (born 1984), Kazakhstani volleyball player
- Antonina Rudenko (born 1950), Soviet swimmer
- Antonina Ryzhova (1934–2020), Soviet volleyball player
- Antonina Seredina (1929–2016), Russian sprint canoeist
- Antonina Shevchenko (born 1984), Kyrgyzstani Muay Thai fighter and mixed martial artist
- Antonina Skorobogatchenko (born 1999), Russian handballer
- Antonina Yefremova (born 1981), Ukrainian middle-distance athlete
- Antonina Zelikovich (born 1958), Russian rower
- Antonina Zetova (born 1973), Bulgarian volleyball player

=== Other ===
- Antonina (wife of Belisarius) (c. 495 – after 565), Byzantine patrikia and wife of Belisarius
- Antonina Bludova (1813–1891), Russian philanthropist and lady-in-waiting
- Antonina W. Bouis, American translator
- Blessed Antonina De Angelis (1880–1962), Italian Roman Catholic
- Antonina Kłoskowska (1919–2001), Polish sociologist
- Antonina Roxa (c. 1807 – 1869), Falkland Island colonist
- Saint Antonina of Antonina and Alexander (died 313), Roman martyr

== Middle name ==
- Hanna Antonina Wojcik Slak (born 1975), Polish-born Slovenian film director and screenwriter
- Blessed Maria Antonina Kratochwil (1881–1942), Austro-Hungarian Catholic saint
- Rachel Fanny Antonina Lee (1770s – 1829), British kidnap victim

== See also ==
- Antonia (name)
- Antonida Asonova
- Antonija
- Antonin (name)
- Antonine (name)
- Antonini (name)
- Antonino (name)
- Antoniny (disambiguation)
- Antoñita (disambiguation)
- Antoniya
