= Antonieta (given name) =

Antonieta is a Portuguese feminine given name that is a diminutive form of Antónia in use in Brazil, Portugal, South Africa, Namibia, Mozambique and Angola. Notable people with this name include the following:

== Given name ==
- Antonieta de Barros (1901–1952), Brazilian journalist and politician
- Antonieta Figueroa (born 1934), Mexican painter
- Antonieta Galleguillos (born 1990), Chilean judoka
- Antonieta Rosa Gomes (born 1959), Bissau-Guinean politician
- Antonieta Sosa (born 1940), American artist

== Middle name ==
- María Antonieta Cámpoli (born 1955), Italian beauty pageant titleholders
- María Antonieta Collins (born 1952), Mexican journalist and author
- María Antonieta de Bográn (born 1955), Honduran politician
- María Antonieta de las Nieves, stage name of María Antonieta Gómez-Rodríguez (born 1950), Mexican actress
- María Antonieta Duque (born 1970), Venezuelan comedian and actress
- María Antonieta Gutiérrez, Venezuelan script writer
- María Antonieta Hernández (born 1958), Mexican gymnast
- María Antonieta Pérez Reyes (born 1963), Mexican politician
- María Antonieta Pons (1922–2004), Cuban film actress

== See also ==
- Antonietta (given name)
- Antoñita (disambiguation), given name/nickname
