= Antoñito (disambiguation) =

Antonio Ramiro Pérez is a Spanish retired footballer who played as a striker.

Antoñito or Antonito may also refer to:

- Antoñito (name), nickname
- Antonito, Colorado, Town in the United States
- Mimobarathra antonito, species in the Mimobarathra genus of moths

== See also ==
- Antonijo, given name
- Antonino (disambiguation)
- Antonio, given name
- San Antonito, Bernalillo County, New Mexico
- San Antonito, Socorro County, New Mexico
