= Toni (disambiguation) =

Toni is a given name.

Toni may also refer to:

== People ==
- Toni (footballer, born 1946), Portuguese football coach and player António José Conceição Oliveira
- Toni (footballer, born 1972), Portuguese football striker Nélson António Soares da Gama
- Toni (footballer, born 1992), Brazilian football midfielder Antonio Rosa Ribeiro
- António Toni Lopes (born 1979), Portuguese footballer commonly known as Toni
- Toni (surname), a list of people

== Arts and entertainment ==
- Toni (1928 film), a British film by Arthur Maude
- Toni (1935 film), a film by Jean Renoir
- Toni (album), a 1956 studio album by Toni Harper
- Swiss Toni, a fictional used-car dealer played by Charlie Higson in the British television series The Fast Show

== Other uses ==
- Tōni Station, a railway station in Kamaishi, Iwate Prefecture, Japan
- 924 Toni, an asteroid

== See also ==
- De Toni (disambiguation)
