= Antoñita =

Antoñita is a given name and a nickname. Notable people with this name include the following.

== Given name ==
- Antoñita Colomé (1912 – 2005), Spanish film actress
- Antonita Maria Carmen Fernandez Moynihan, birthname of Maritoni Fernandez (born 1969), Filipina character actress and model
- Antoñita Singla (born 1948), Spanish flamenco dancer and actress

== Nickname ==
- Antoñita, family nickname for Beatified María Antonia Bandrés Elósegui (1898 – 1919), Spanish Roman Catholic

== Fictional characters ==
- Antoñita la Fantástica, Borita Casas character
- Antoñita "Lupe" Sino, the name of the Penélope Cruz character inspired by Spanish actress Lupe Sino (born Antonia Bronchalo Lopesino) in Manolete

== See also ==
- Antonia (name)
- Antonida Asonova
- Antonieta (given name)
- Antonija
- Antonina (name)
- Antoñito (name)
- Antoniya
