= Antonija =

Antonija is a Croatian, Latvian, Serbian and Slovene variant of the feminine given name Antonia. Notable people with the name include:

- Antonija Blaće (born 1979), Croatian television presenter
- Antonija Höffern (1803–1871), Slovenian noblewoman
- Antonija Javornik (1893–1974), Serbian women soldier
- Antonija Nađ (born 1986), Serbian sprint canoeist
- Antonija Panda (born 1977), Serbian sprint canoeist
- Antonija Sandrić (born 1988), Croatian basketball player
- Antonija Šola (born 1979), Croatian actress and singer

== See also ==
- Antonia (name)
- Antonida Asonova
- Antonije
- Antonijo
- Antonijs
- Antonina (name)
- Antoñita (disambiguation)
- Antoniya
