= Jane Cowley =

South African politician and former educator

Jane Cowley MPL

Member of the Eastern Cape Provincial Legislature
- Incumbent
- Assumed office 21 November 2016

Personal details
- Born: Queenstown, Cape Province, South Africa
- Party: Democratic Alliance
- Spouse: Paul
- Education: Stellenbosch University (BSc); UNISA (HDE); Rhodes University (M.Ed)
- Profession: Educator, politician

Jane Mary Cowley is a South African politician and former educator who has represented the Democratic Alliance in the Eastern Cape Provincial Legislature since 2016. She was a DA councillor in the Ndlambe Local Municipality from 2014 to 2016.

== Background and education ==
Cowley was born and attended school in Queenstown in what is now the Eastern Cape province of South Africa. After finishing high school, she studied at Stellenbosch University and graduated with a Bachelor of Science. She later earned a higher diploma in education from the University of South Africa.

Cowley started her teaching career as a mathematics and biology teacher at Qhayiya Combined school in 1993. She was appointed principal of Shaw Park Primary School in 1999. Cowley also taught mathematics for learners up to grade 10 through a catch-up programme run by Rhodes University, from which she would later graduate with a Master of Education degree in mathematics. Cowley left the teaching profession in 2011.

== Political career ==
Cowley became a Democratic Alliance councillor in the Ndlambe Local Municipality in 2014, serving on the council until 2016, when she became a member of the Eastern Cape Provincial Legislature for the party. She was elected to a full term in the 2019 provincial election and became the Shadow Member of the Executive Council for Health. Cowley said in July 2021 that the provincial health department was in a "terrible crisis" and should be placed under national government administration.

Cowley was re-elected for another term in 2024. In November 2024, the Eastern Cape health department accused Cowley of spreading fake news after saying that two patients had died in the Frontier Hospital in Komani during power outages.

== Personal life ==
Cowley is married to Paul. The couple has two adult sons.
