= Antonia (name) =

Feminine given name

- Pronunciation: Italian: [anˈtɔːnja]
- Gender: Female
- Language: Polish, Portuguese, Spanish, Italian

Origin
- Languages: Latin, from Etruscan
- Origin: Antonius

Other names
- Nicknames: Toni, Anto, Nia, Toña
- Related names: Antonietta, Antoinette

Antonia, Antónia, Antônia, or Antonía is a feminine given name and a surname. It is of Roman origin, used as the name of women of the Antonius family. Its meaning is "priceless", "praiseworthy" and "beautiful". Antonia is a Polish, Portuguese, Spanish, Italian, and Maltese name used in many parts of the world.

Antonia is a Spanish, Italian, Polish and Maltese feminine form of Anton/Antonio used in Italy, Spain, Malta, Switzerland, Argentina and other countries. Antónia (European Portuguese) and Antônia (Brazilian Portuguese) are Portuguese variants of António/Antônio. Antonía is an Icelandic feminine form of Antonie used in Iceland. In Greek, Antonia (Greek: Αντωνία) is the feminine form of Antonios (Αντώνιος) and Antonis (Αντώνης), used mainly in Greece and Cyprus.

== Variants ==
- Anthonia – Danish, Finnish, Swedish
- Antoaneta – Bulgarian
- Antoinette – French
- Antonela – Albanian
- Antonella – Danish, Italian, Norwegian, Spanish, Swedish
- Antoneta – Albanian
- Antonette – English
- Antonia – Albanian, Bulgarian, Croatian, Danish, Dutch, English, German, Georgian, Italian, Norwegian, Polish, Romanian, Russian, Spanish, Swedish
- Ántonia – Bohemian
- Antonía – Icelandic
- Antònia – Catalan
- Antónia – Hungarian, Portuguese, Slovak
- Antônia – Brazilian Portuguese
- Antonie – Czech, Danish, Norwegian, Swedish
- Antonieta – Portuguese
- Antonietta – Italian, Spanish
- Antonija – Croatian, Latvian, Serbian, Slovene
- Antonina – Italian, Polish
- Antonine – Danish, Norwegian, Swedish
- Antía – Galician
- Ndine – Albanian
- Nedda – Italian
- Nela – Croatian, Czech, Slovak
- Nettie – Danish, Dutch, English, Finnish, Norwegian, Swedish
- Teuna – Dutch
- Toini – Finnish
- Toni – English
- Toñi – Spanish
- Tonia – English, Polish
- Tonka – Croatian, Slovene
- Tony – English
- Tonya – English, Russian, Ukrainian
- Tončica – Croatian (Dalmatian)
- Tosia – Polish
- Αντωνία (Antonia or Andonia) – Greek

== Roman women ==
The name of any women of the Antonius family in Ancient Rome:

- Antonia (aunt of Mark Antony), the daughter of Marcus Antonius (orator)
- Antonia Hybrida Major, the first daughter of politician Gaius Antonius Hybrida she married the tribune Lucius Caninius Gallus
- Antonia Hybrida Minor, the second daughter of politician Gaius Antonius Hybrida, she married her cousin Mark Antony
- Antonia (wife of Vatinius), sister of Mark Antony, she married Publius Vatinius
- Daughters of Mark Antony
  - Antonia (wife of Pythodoros), married wealthy Greek Pythodoros of Tralles
  - Antonia Major, grandmother of Roman Empress Valeria Messalina and Roman Emperor Nero
  - Antonia Minor, mother of Roman Emperor Claudius and grandmother of Roman Emperor Caligula
- Iulla Antonia, maternal granddaughter of Octavia Minor and paternal granddaughter of Mark Anthony
- Antonia Tryphaena, granddaughter Pythodoros of Tralles, princess of Pontus
- Antonia Furnilla, mother of Marcia (mother of Trajan) and Marcia Furnilla
- Claudia Antonia, Roman princess, granddaughter of Antonia Minor and a daughter of Roman Emperor Claudius
- Antonia Clementiana, daughter of Roman Governor of Judea, Antonius Felix
- Antonia Agrippina, a possible granddaughter of Roman Governor of Judea, Antonius Felix
- Antonia Gordiana, daughter, sister and mother of Emperors Gordian I to III respectively
- Antonia and Alexander, Roman Catholic saints

== Other people ==
- Antonia Brenner (1926–2013), Mexican nun
- Nina Antonia (born 1960), British journalist and writer
- Antònia Abelló (1913–1984), Spanish political activist, journalist, feminist
- Antonia Ax:son Johnson (born 1943), Swedish businesswoman
- Antonia of Baux (1353–1375), queen consort of Sicily
- Antonia Byatt (born 1936), British novelist and poet
- Antonia Campbell-Hughes (born 1982), Northern Irish actress
- Jane Antonia Cornish (born 1975), British Contemporary classical music composer
- Antonia of Douro (born 1955), descendant of emperor Wilhelm II of Germany
- Toni Garrn (born in 1992 as Antonia Garrn), German model
- Antonia Goldner (born 1981), German politician
- Antonia Göransson (born 1990), Swedish footballer
- Antonia Guvava, Zimbabwean judge
- Antonia Iacobescu, also known as Antonia (born 1989), Romanian singer
- Antônia Keyla (born 1994), Brazilian para-athlete
- Antonia Kidman (born 1970), Australian journalist and sister of Nicole Kidman
- Antonia Kinlay, British actress
- Antonia Laucher (1786–1871), German soprano
- Antonia Lofaso (born 1976), American celebrity chef and restaurateur
- Princess Antonia of Luxembourg (1899–1954)
- Antônia Melo (born 1949), Brazilian human rights activist and environmentalist
- Antonia Mielke (1856–1907), German operatic soprano
- Antonia Moraiti (born 1977), Greek water polo player
- Antonia Nava de Catalán (1779 – 1843), heroine of the Mexican War of Independence
- Antonia Niedermaier (born 2003), German cyclist and ski mountaineer
- Antonia Nocca, also known as Antonia (born 2005), Italian singer-songwriter
- Antonia Novello (born 1944), first female and Hispanic Surgeon General of the United States
- Antonia Papandreou, American engineer
- Antonia Pietschmann (born 2006), German luger
- Anntonia Porsild (born 1996), Thai actress and model
- Antónia of Portugal (1845–1913), Portuguese princess
- Antonia Pozzi (1912–1938), Italian poet
- Antonia Prebble (born 1984), New Zealand actress
- Antonia Rados (born 1953), Austrian television journalist
- Antonia Ramírez (died 2024), Salvadoran singer and language activist
- Antonia Reed, birth name of Bahamadia (born 1966), American hip-hop artist
- Antônia Ronnycleide da Costa Silva, also known as Antônia (born 1994), Brazilian footballer
- Antonia Ružić (born 2003), Croatian tennis player
- Antonia Stergiou (born 1985), Greek high jumper
- Antonia Thomas (born 1986), British actress
- Antonia Wright (born 1979), American reality television personality
- Archduchess Maria Antonietta of Austria (1858–1883)
- Helena Antonia (1550–1595), bearded female court dwarf
- Susan Williams Antonia Stockard, birthname of Stockard Channing (born 1944), American actress

== Fictional people ==
- Antonia (Ninjago), a character in Ninjago
- Antonia Ridderfjell, fictional character in the Bert Diaries comic book adaptions, cousin of Emilia Ridderfjell
- Antonia, heroine in the Gothic novel The Monk.
- Ántonia, a character within the novel My Ántonia.
- Antonia Quixana, the niece and house-keeper of Don Quixote.

== Surname ==
- Jarchinio Antonia (born 1990), Curaçaoan footballer

== See also ==
- Antonia (disambiguation)
- Antona (name)
- Antonic
- Antonida Asonova
- Antonik
- Antonin (name)
- Antonina (name)
- Antoñita (disambiguation), given name/nickname
- Antoniu
- Antoniya
- Antonya Nelson (born 1961), U.S. author
- Tonia (name)
