= Martha & Snoop's Potluck Dinner Party =

American reality television series

- Also known as: Martha & Snoop's Potluck Party Challenge (S3)
- Genre: Reality
- Starring: Martha Stewart; Snoop Dogg; Fredwreck
- Country of origin: United States
- Original language: English
- No. of seasons: 3
- No. of episodes: 40

Production
- Executive producer: SallyAnn Salsano
- Running time: 19–38 minutes
- Production companies: VH1 Productions; 495 Productions

Original release
- Network: VH1
- Release: November 7, 2016 – February 12, 2020

Martha & Snoop's Potluck Dinner Party is an American variety show that was hosted by Martha Stewart and Snoop Dogg. The show aired on VH1 for three seasons from November 7, 2016, to February 12, 2020, in which it broadcast 40 episodes. Taped at the CBS Studio Center, the show featured Stewart and Snoop Dogg hosting weekly dinner parties with celebrity guests.

== Production ==
According to Stewart, the show was "right for the time, I think, when we do need a little bit of levity in our lives, because of what’s going on".

== Broadcast history and release ==
On November 21, 2016, VH1 renewed the show for a second season.

== Episodes ==
=== Season 1 (2016–2017) ===
No. overall	No. in season	Title	Original release date	US viewers (millions)
1	1	"Putting the Pot in Potluck"	November 7, 2016	1.68
Seth Rogen, Ice Cube and Wiz Khalifa appear as guests. Anderson Paak performs.
2	2	"Keep Your Claws Off Me"	November 14, 2016	1.52
Ashley Graham and Rick Ross appear as guests.
3	3	"Ruffling Feathers"	November 21, 2016	1.47
Naya Rivera, Chris Bosh and 2 Chainz appear as guests. Dreezy performs.
4	4	"Bringing Home the Bacon"	November 28, 2016	1.56
Robin Thicke, Keke Palmer and DJ Khaled appear as guests.
5	5	"Deck the Balls"	December 5, 2016	1.05
Jason Derulo and Jamie Chung appear as guests.
6	6	"Something Fishy"	February 13, 2017	1.29
Kathy Griffin, Mike Epps, Abe Hiroki and Masaharu Morimoto appear as guests. DRAM performs.
7	7	"They Got Game"	February 13, 2017	1.11
Snoop Dogg's youth football team the Pomona Steelers appear as guests.
8	8	"High on the Hog"	February 20, 2017	1.00
Fat Joe and Kelis appear as guests. Fat Joe and Remy Ma perform.
9	9	"Keeping It in the Family"	February 27, 2017	0.90
Ashlee Simpson, Evan Ross and Uncle Reo appear as guests.
10	10	"Makin' That Dough"	March 6, 2017	1.11
Bella Thorne and 50 Cent appear as guests. October London performs.

=== Season 2 (2017–2018) ===
No. overall	No. in season	Title	Original release date	US viewers (millions)
11	1	"Happy Birthday, Snoop!"	October 16, 2017	1.35
Jamie Foxx, Patti LaBelle and Charlie Wilson appear as guests.
12	2	"Tricks and Treats"	October 23, 2017	0.84
Tichina Arnold and Ross Matthews appear as guests.
13	3	"Keepin' It Crunk"	October 30, 2017	1.02
Diddy, Usher and La La Anthony appear as guests.
14	4	"Let's Get Roasted"	November 8, 2017	0.54
LL Cool J, Kate Upton and Jeff Ross appear as guests.
15	5	"We've Got Sole"	November 15, 2017	0.62
Wendy Williams and Post Malone appear as guests.
16	6	"Bon Appetizzle"	November 22, 2017	0.58
Wilmer Valderrama and Tamar Braxton appear as guests.
17	7	"Getting Some Tongue"	November 29, 2017	0.60
Kelly Rowland and George Lopez appear as guests.
18	8	"Joy to the Wizorld!"	November 29, 2017	0.53
Sharon Osbourne, Kelly Osbourne and Rae Sremmurd appear as guests.
19	9	"What's Your Beef?"	August 1, 2018	0.63
RuPaul and Faith Evans appear as guests.
20	10	"Gettin' Veggie With It"	August 1, 2018	0.57
Michelle Rodriguez and Cedric the Entertainer appear as guests.
21	11	"Shell of a Good Time"	August 8, 2018	0.66
Anthony Anderson and Christina Milian appear as guests.
22	12	"Grilled Muncheese"	August 8, 2018	0.51
Lil Rel and Kat Graham appear as guests.
23	13	"Return of the Mac N Cheese"	August 15, 2018	0.73
Terrence Howard, Queen Latifah and Jussie Smollett appear as guests.
24	14	"Wok This Way"	August 15, 2018	0.58
Margaret Cho and G-Eazy appear as guests.
25	15	"In the Mood"	August 22, 2018	0.61
Craig Robinson and Jeannie Mai appear as guests.
26	16	"Pasta La Vista, Baby!"	August 22, 2018	0.52
Wendi McLendon-Covey and Steve Aoki appear as guests.
27	17	"Let's Bayou Dinner"	August 29, 2018	0.65
Ty Dolla Sign, Wanda Sykes and Lance Bass appear as guests.
28	18	"Taj Ma-Holler"	August 29, 2018	0.57
Laverne Cox, Gary Owen and Lil Yachty appear as guests.
29	19	"Stackin' My Bread"	September 5, 2018	0.482
T-Pain and Karrueche appear as guests.
30	20	"Spicing It Up"	September 5, 2018	0.396
Don Cheadle, Sherri Shepherd and Chilli from TLC appear as guests.

=== Season 3: Potluck Party Challenge (2019–20) ===
For this season, the show slightly changes into a competition format as Martha and Snoop along with their respective celebrity team members compete for the "Potluck Party Platter" with celebrity judge(s) choosing the winning team.

Note: The winning team are listed in bold

No. overall	No. in season	Title	Original release date	US viewers (millions)
31	1	"4/20: The Munchie Snackdown"	April 3, 2019	0.710
Team Martha: Matthew McConaughey Team Snoop: Method Man Guest Judge: Isla Fisher
32	2	"Mother of All Brunches"	May 1, 2019	0.464
Team Martha: Octavia Spencer Team Snoop: Fergie Guest Judges: Toya Wright; Rumer Willis
33	3	"Best Friend-Ly Competition"	May 30, 2019	0.414
Team Martha: Tiffany Haddish Team Snoop: Meghan Trainor Guest Judge: Kandi Burruss
34	4	"Father's Day Food Fight"	June 11, 2019	0.411
Team Martha: Reverend Run Team Snoop: Regina Hall Guest Judge: Jessie T. Usher
35	5	"BBQ Battle"	July 16, 2019	0.453
Team Martha: Nick Jonas Team Snoop: Joe Jonas Guest Judge: Loni Love Special Appearances: MC Lyte; Kevin Jonas
36	6	"Halloween Food Fight"	October 22, 2019	0.270
Team Martha: Lil Pump Team Snoop: Eve Guest Judge: Tami Roman
37	7	"#Friendsgiving Face-Off"	November 20, 2019	0.369
Team Martha: Yvonne Orji Team Snoop: Jimmy Kimmel Guest Judge: Guillermo Rodriguez
38	8	"Holiday Frost Fight"	December 11, 2019	0.358
Team Martha: Tank Team Snoop: Paris Hilton Guest Judge: Ha Ha Davis
39	9	"Championship Chow Down"	January 15, 2020	0.449
Team Martha: Michael Strahan Team Snoop: Michael Rapaport Guest Judges: Jesse Palmer; Laurie Hernandez
40	10	"Eat Your Heart Out"	February 12, 2020	0.411
Team Martha: Trey Songz Team Snoop: Tamar Braxton Guest Judge: William Shatner

== Reception ==
=== Television viewership and ratings ===
The show was the number one non-sports cable show in its time slot and opened to a 1.5 rating among adults 18-49.

=== Critical response ===
The show received a positive reception from television critics upon its premiere. Lauren Carroll Harris of The Guardian described it as a "glorious piece of ironic programming", in which she praised the show's format and the chemistry between its hosts.

=== Awards ===
Awards and nominations
Award	Year (Note: Indicates the year of ceremony)	Category	Nominee(s)	Result	Ref.
Emmy Awards	2017	Outstanding Host for a Reality or Reality Competition Program	Martha Stewart and Snoop Dogg	Nominated	
NAACP Image Awards	2018	Outstanding Reality Program/Reality Competition Series	Martha & Snoop's Potluck Dinner Party	Nominated	
