= Nokuthula Mlokoti =

South African politician

Nokuthula Mlokoti MPL

Member of the Eastern Cape Provincial Legislature
- Incumbent
- Assumed office 14 June 2024

Personal details
- Party: Economic Freedom Fighters
- Education: Walter Sisulu University (BA)
- Profession: Politician

Nokuthula Mlokoti is a South African politician for the Economic Freedom Fighters party. She was elected to the Eastern Cape Provincial Legislature in the 2024 provincial election.

In November 2022, she unsuccessfully contested the position of deputy provincial chairperson at the EFF's provincial conference, however, she was soon appointed to the position after the national EFF leadership reconfigured the provincial leadership to include women after an all-male provincial leadership was elected at the conference.

Mlokoti graduated from Walter Sisulu University with a Bachelor of Arts in Education in May 2024.
