= Tiphany Harmse =

South African politician

Tiphany Harmse MPL

Member of the Eastern Cape Provincial Legislature
- Incumbent
- Assumed office 14 June 2024

Personal details
- Party: Patriotic Alliance

Tiphany Stacey Harmse is a South African politician, who was elected to the Eastern Cape Provincial Legislature in the 2024 provincial election. She previously served as a councillor in the Bitou Local Municipality.

== Political career ==
Harmse was the Patriotic Alliance's mayoral candidate for Nelson Mandela Bay in the Eastern Cape during the 2021 municipal elections, however, she was removed as a candidate prior to the elections. On 24 October 2022, she was sworn in as a Patriotic Alliance councillor in the Bitou Local Municipality in the Western Cape. She did not serve on the council for long, as she resigned in March 2023.

Harmse was elected to the Eastern Cape Provincial Legislature in the 2024 provincial election, having been ranked first on the PA's candidate list. Soon after, she was soon after chosen by the ruling African National Congress to chair the legislature's Standing Committee on Public Accounts, succeeding former ANC MPL Mxolisi Dimaza, who left the legislature at the election. Harmse was the only MPL from an opposition party selected to chair a committee.

== Personal life ==
On 11 April 2024, Harmse was allegedly assaulted at her residence by Waleed Grootboom, PA councillor in the Knysna Local Municipality, who was then arrested.
