= Mkululi Mcotsho =

South African politician

Mkululi Mcotsho MPL

Member of thee Eastern Cape Provincial Legislature
- Incumbent
- Assumed office 14 June 2024

Personal details
- Party: United Democratic Movement (2023–present)
- Other political affiliations: African National Congress (Until 2023)

Mkululi Mackson Mcotsho is a South African politician who was elected to the Eastern Cape Provincial Legislature in the 2024 provincial election as a member of the United Democratic Movement.

Mcotsho was formerly an ANC councillor and the council speaker in the Mbhashe Local Municipality until his defection to the UDM in February 2023.

In the provincial legislature, Mcotsho is a member of the oversight committee, the public participation, petitions and education committee and the co-operative governance and traditional affairs, health and economic development, environmental affairs and tourism portfolio committees.
