= Toni (surname) =

Toni is a surname. Notable people and characters with the surname include:

- Ana Toni, British non-profit director and grantmaker working in Brazil, and Brazil government minister
- Angelo Michele Toni (1640–1708), Italian painter
- Francesca Toni, Italian computer scientist
- Francesco Toni (1921–1991), Italian politician
- Lapalapa Toni (born 1994), Samoan footballer
- Loujaya Toni, former name of Loujaya Kouza, Papua New Guinean politician
- Luca Toni (born 1977), Italian footballer
- Mauricio Toni (born 1998), Argentine footballer
- Sindile Toni (21st century), South African politician
- Swiss Toni, British television comedy character played by Charlie Higson

== See also ==
- De Toni, an Italian surname
