= Marlene Ewers =

South African politician

Marlene Ewers MPL

Member of the Eastern Cape Provincial Legislature
- Incumbent
- Assumed office 14 June 2024

Personal details
- Profession: Politician

Marlene Vonita Ewers is a South African politician who was elected to the Eastern Cape Provincial Legislature in the 2024 provincial election as a member of the Democratic Alliance. Ewers had been in the political space for 20 years at the time of her election. Ewers serves as the DA's Shadow Member of the Executive Council for Social Development.
