= Tonis =

Tonis may refer to:

- Tõnis, Estonian given name
- Tonis (Canada), TV channel
- Tonis (Ukraine), TV channel
- Mike Tonis (born 1979), American baseball catcher

== See also ==
- Toni (disambiguation)
- Tonnis
