= Wongama Gela =

South African politician

Wongama Gela MPL

Member of the Eastern Cape Provincial Legislature
- Incumbent
- Assumed office 14 June 2024

Personal details
- Party: African National Congress

Wongama Gela is a South African politician who was elected to the Eastern Cape Provincial Legislature in 2024 as a representative of the African National Congress. He formerly served as the executive mayor of the OR Tambo District Municipality and as the chairperson of the ANC's Chris Hani region.

In August 2023, Gela was co-opted onto the ANC Provincial Executive Committee which resulted in him stepping down as regional chairperson. He then resigned as mayor later that same month and joined the provincial government as the chief of staff in MEC Nonceba Kontsiwe's office, a position he would hold until his election to the provincial legislature in June 2024.
