= Bukeka Bodoza =

South African politician

Bukeka Bodoza MPL

Member of the Eastern Cape Provincial Legislature
- Incumbent
- Assumed office 14 June 2024

Personal details
- Party: Economic Freedom Fighters
- Profession: Politician

Bukeka Bodoza is a South African politician who is a first-term member of the Eastern Cape Provincial Legislature for the Economic Freedom Fighters. She was elected in the 2024 provincial election.
