= Zikhona Njoli =

South African politician

Zikhona Njoli MPL

Member of the Eastern Cape Provincial Legislature
- Incumbent
- Assumed office 14 June 2024

Personal details
- Party: Economic Freedom Fighters
- Profession: Politician

Zikhona Nwabisa Njoli is a South African politician who was elected to the Eastern Cape Provincial Legislature in the 2024 provincial election as a member of the Economic Freedom Fighters.

In November 2022, Njoli unsuccessfully contested the position of deputy provincial secretary of the EFF at the party's provincial conference in November 2022, losing to Zolile Mgqwayiza by only two votes, however, the EFF national leadership took the decision to reconfigure the party's all-male provincial leadership elected at the conference, and appointed Njoli to the position of deputy provincial secretary.
