= Ntombizodwa Gqirana =

South African politician

Ntombizodwa Gqirana MPL

Member of the Eastern Cape Provincial Legislature
- Incumbent
- Assumed office 14 June 2024

Personal details
- Born: Ntombizodwa Jacqueline Gqirana
- Party: African National Congress
- Profession: Politician

Ntombizodwa Jacqueline Gqirana is a South African politician was elected to the Eastern Cape Provincial Legislature in 2024 as a representative of the African National Congress. She is also a member of the National Executive Committee of the Democratic Nursing Organisation of South Africa as the deputy provincial chairperson of the organisation in the Eastern Cape.
