= Asanda Tebekana =

South African politician

Asanda Tebekana MPL

Member of the Eastern Cape Provincial Legislature
- Incumbent
- Assumed office 14 June 2024

Personal details
- Party: African National Congress
- Profession: Politician

Asanda Tebekana is a South African politician who is a first-term member of the Eastern Cape Provincial Legislature representing the African National Congress. She was elected to the provincial legislature in 2024 provincial election, having been ranked 31st on the ANC's provincial list.
