= Tonazzi =

Tonazzi may refer to:

- Laëtitia Tonazzi (born 1981), a French football player
- Marco Tonazzi (born 1961), Italian former alpine skier
- Kio Ene-Tonazzi-DMT, a professional continental road bicycle racing team based in Italy,

== See also ==
- Toni
