= Noncedo Zinti =

South African politician

Noncedo Zinti MPL

Member of the Eastern Cape Provincial Legislature
- Incumbent
- Assumed office 8 December 2020

Personal details
- Party: United Democratic Movement
- Profession: Politician

Noncedo Zinti is a South African politician who has represented the United Democratic Movement in the Eastern Cape Provincial Legislature since December 2020. She was elected to a full term in the 2024 provincial election.
