= Kabelo Mogatosi =

South African politician

Kabelo Mogatosi MPL

Member of the Eastern Cape Provincial Legislature
- Incumbent
- Assumed office 14 June 2024

Personal details
- Born: Mokgethi Kabelo Mogatosi
- Party: Democratic Alliance
- Profession: Politician

Mokgethi Kabelo Mogatosi is a South African politician who was elected to the Eastern Cape Provincial Legislature in the 2024 provincial election as a member of the Democratic Alliance.

== Political career ==
Mogatosi was involved with the Democratic Alliance Student Organisation's successful Student representative council campaign at the University of Fort Hare in 2015. In January 2016, Mogatosi was sworn in as a Democratic Alliance councillor in Nelson Mandela Bay. He became chief whip of the DA caucus in the metro in 2019.

Mogatosi was re-elected to council in the 2021 local government elections. When a DA-led coalition took over the metro in September 2022, he was named member of the Mayoral Committee for Roads and Transport. He became the MMC for Budget and Treasury in March 2023, however, he did not serve in that position for long, as the DA-led administration was removed in a motion of no confidence in May 2023.

In March 2024, two months ahead of the 2024 national and provincial elections, Mogatosi was announced as a DA candidate for the elections. He was elected to the Eastern Cape Provincial Legislature in the provincial election.
