= Toini =

Toini is a Finnish given name, derived from Antonia. It is also considered to be the feminine form of Finnish masculine given name Anttoni in use in Finland, eastern Sweden and the Republic of Karelia. Toini may refer to:

- Toini Gustafsson (born 1938), former Swedish cross country skier
- Toini Mäkelä (1895–1973), Finnish socialist revolutionary and military officer
- Toini Pöysti (born 1933), former cross-country skier from Finland
- Toini Topelius (1854–1910), Finnish journalist
- Toini Voipio (1878–1937), Finnish educator and politician
