= Petros Vantyu =

South African politician

Petros Vantyu MPL

Member of the Eastern Cape Provincial Legislature
- Incumbent
- Assumed office 14 June 2024

Personal details
- Born: Petros Vantyu
- Party: African National Congress
- Other political affiliations: uMkhonto weSizwe (former)
- Profession: Politician

Petros Vantyu, commonly known as Bushy Vantyu, is a South African anti-apartheid activist and politician who is a first-term member of the Eastern Cape Provincial Legislature representing the African National Congress. He was elected to the provincial legislature in the 2024 provincial election.

Vantyu was shot and injured by Ciskei Defence Force members on 7 September 1992 in what would become known as the Bisho massacre.
