= Sibongile Aloni =

South African politician

Sibongile Aloni MPL

Member of the Eastern Cape Provincial Legislature
- Incumbent
- Assumed office 14 June 2024

Personal details
- Party: Economic Freedom Fighters
- Profession: Politician

Petrus Sibongile Aloni is a South African politician who was elected to the Eastern Cape Provincial Legislature in the 2024 provincial election as a member of the Economic Freedom Fighters.
