= Antonijs =

Antonijs is a given name. Notable people with the name include:

- Antonijs Černomordijs (born 1996), Latvian footballer
- Antonijs Springovičs (1876–1958), Roman Catholic Latvian bishop

== See also ==
- Antonis
- Antonija
- Antonije
- Antonijo
