= Antoñito (name) =

Antoñito is a Spanish given name and nickname derived from Antonio. It is loosely equivalent to "Little Tony" in English. People with this nickname include the following notable persons:

- Antonio Ramiro Pérez, known as Antoñito, (born 1978), Spanish footballer
- Antonio Jesús Regal Angulo, known as Antoñito (footballer, born 1987), (born 1987), Spanish footballer
- Antonio Ruiz Escaño, known as Antoñito Ruiz and El Niño Leone (born 1951), child actor and stuntman

== See also ==
- Antoñito (disambiguation)
- Antonijo
- Antonino (name)
- Antoñita (disambiguation)
- Antonio
