= Giuseppe Corsini =

Italian politician (1897–1983)

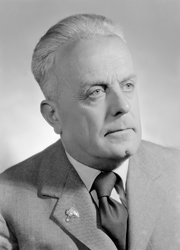

Mayor of Pistoia
- In office 22 December 1946 – 30 June 1951
- Preceded by: Gino Michelozzi
- Succeeded by: Giuseppe Gentile

Senator of the Italian Republic
- In office 25 June 1953 – 11 June 1958

Personal details
- Born: 31 May 1897 Pistoia, Province of Florence, Kingdom of Italy
- Died: 21 November 1983 Pistoia, Tuscany, Italy
- Party: Italian Communist Party
- Occupation: Railway employee

Giuseppe Corsini (31 May 1897 – 21 November 1983) was an Italian politician. A member of the Italian Communist Party, he served as mayor of Pistoia from 1946 to 1951 and as a senator in the II Legislature of the Italian Republic.
