= List of mayors of Pistoia =

Mayor of Pistoia
- Sindaco di Pistoia
- Incumbent; Giovanni Capecchi (EV) since 27 May 2026
- Appointer: Popular election
- Term length: 5 years, renewable once
- Formation: 1865
- Website: Official website

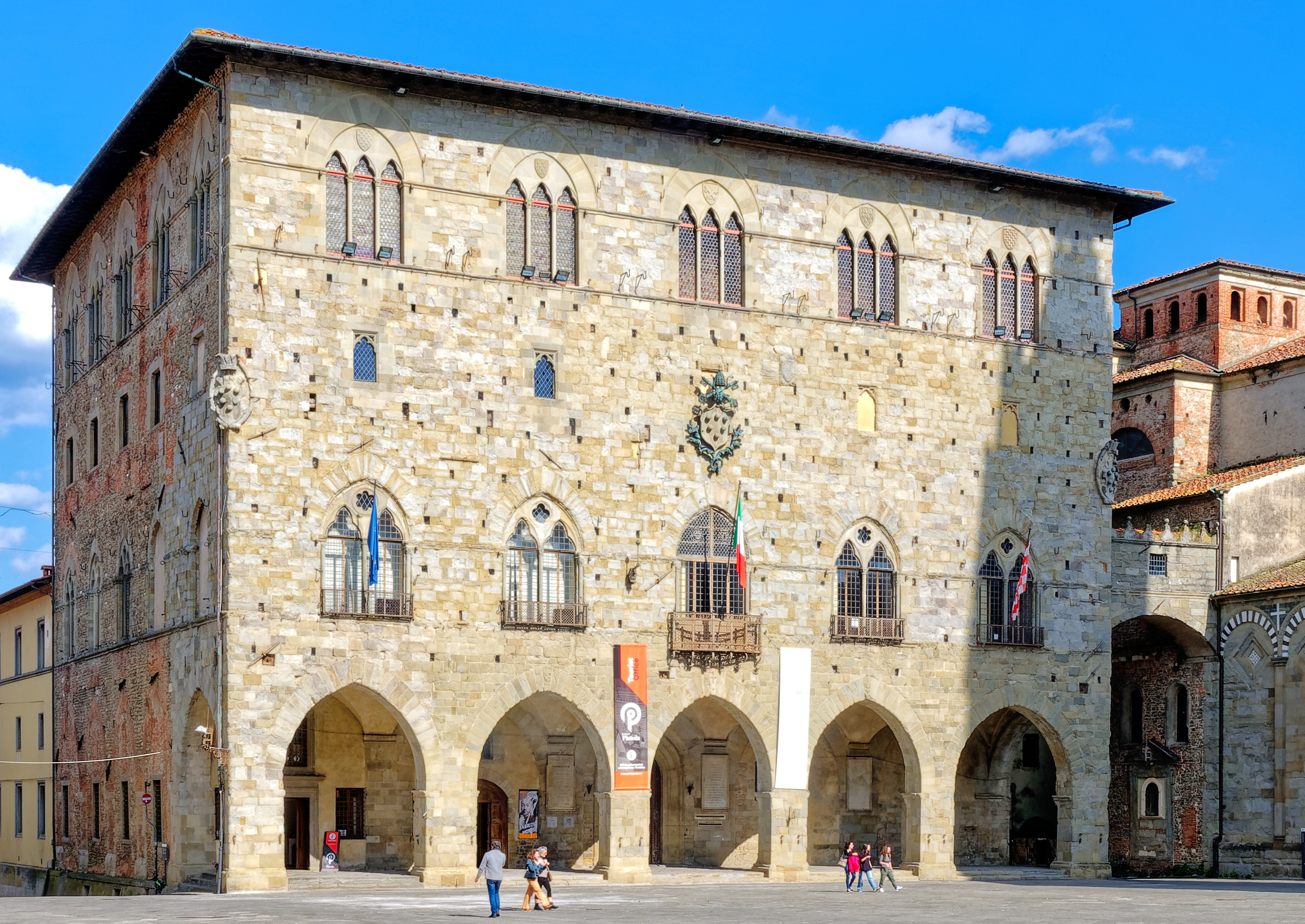
Pistoia's Town Hall.

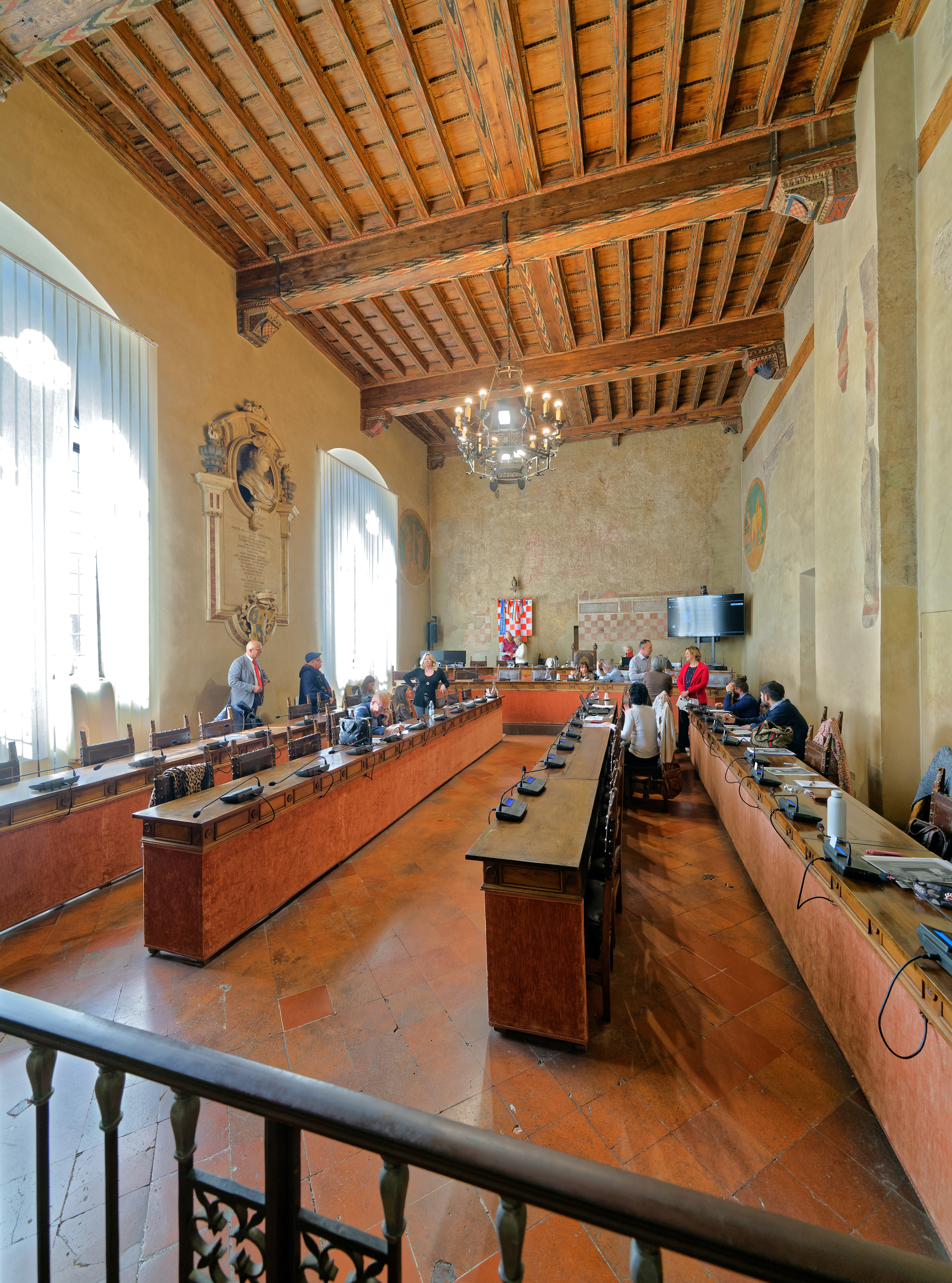
Pistoia's City Council.

The Mayor of Pistoia is an elected politician who, along with the Pistoia's city council, is accountable for the strategic government of Pistoia in Tuscany, Italy.

The current mayor is Giovanni Capecchi (EV), who took office on 27 May 2026.

== Overview ==
According to the Italian Constitution, the mayor of Pistoia is member of the City Council.

The mayor is elected by the population of Pistoia, who also elect the members of the city council, controlling the mayor's policy guidelines and is able to enforce his resignation by a motion of no confidence. The mayor is entitled to appoint and release the members of his government.

Since 1994 the mayor is elected directly by Pistoia's electorate: in all mayoral elections in Italy in cities with a population higher than 15,000 the voters express a direct choice for the mayor or an indirect choice voting for the party of the candidate's coalition. If no candidate receives at least 50% of votes, the top two candidates go to a second round after two weeks. The election of the City Council is based on a direct choice for the candidate with a preference vote: the candidate with the majority of the preferences is elected. The number of the seats for each party is determined proportionally.

== Italian Republic (since 1946) ==
=== City Council election (1946–1994) ===
From 1946 to 1994, the Mayor of Pistoia was elected by the City Council.

	Mayor	Term start	Term end	Party
1	Giuseppe Corsini	22 December 1946	30 June 1951	PCI
2	Giuseppe Gentile	30 June 1951	16 November 1959	PCI
3	Corrado Gelli	16 November 1959	20 July 1970	PCI
4	Francesco Toni	20 July 1970	18 May 1976	PCI
5	Renzo Bardelli	18 May 1976	24 June 1982	PCI
6	Vannino Chiti	24 June 1982	24 June 1985	PCI
7	Luciano Pallini	24 June 1985	10 October 1988	PCI
8	Marcello Bucci	10 October 1988	11 September 1992	PCI
9	Lido Scarpetti	11 September 1992	28 June 1994	PDS

=== Direct election (since 1994) ===
Since 1994, under provisions of new local administration law, the Mayor of Pistoia is chosen by direct election, originally every four, then every five years.

	Mayor	Term start	Term end	Party	Coalition	Election
(9)	Lido Scarpetti	28 June 1994	26 May 1998	PDS; DS	PDS • FdV	1994
(9)	Lido Scarpetti	26 May 1998	28 May 2002	PDS; DS	DS • PPI • FdV • SDI	1998
10	Renzo Berti	28 May 2002	12 June 2007	DS; PD	DS • DL • PRC • FdV	2002
10	Renzo Berti	12 June 2007	8 May 2012	DS; PD	DS • DL • PRC • PdCI	2007
11	Samuele Bertinelli	8 May 2012	26 June 2017	PD	PD • IdV • SEL • FdS	2012
12	Alessandro Tomasi	26 June 2017	13 June 2022	FdI	FdI • Lega • FI	2017
12	Alessandro Tomasi	13 June 2022	1 December 2025 (Note: Resigned after being elected regional councillor. The deputy Mayor Anna Maria Ida Celesti (FI) held the office till a new municipal election was held.)	FdI	FdI • Lega • FI	2022
13	Giovanni Capecchi	27 May 2026	Incumbent	EV	PD • AVS • IV	2026

== See also ==
- Timeline of Pistoia
