= Juan‐Pierré Pretorius =

South African legislator and ANC politician

JP Pretorius MPL

Member of the Eastern Cape Provincial Legislature
- Incumbent
- Assumed office 14 June 2024

Personal details
- Born: Juan‐Pierré Pretorius; 30 January 1982 (age 44) Port Elizabeth, Eastern Cape
- Party: African National Congress
- Education: Bachelor of Arts Communication Science
- Alma mater: University of South Africa
- Occupation: Member of the Eastern Cape Legislature
- Profession: Politician

JP Pretorius is a South African legislator who has represented the African National Congress in the Eastern Cape Provincial Legislature since 2024. He was ranked 26th on the party's list for the 2024 provincial election. He previously held the position of Troika Spokesperson in the Nelson Mandela Bay Municipality and Caucus Support Officer in the Chief Whip’s Office.

== Political Career ==
JP Pretorius served in the ANC Regional Task Team in Nelson Mandela Region from 2018 to 2021 and was the party’s Regional Spokesperson.

He initiated the ANC National Groups initiative and led its task team with the aim of establishing a structure within the ANC at its headquarters to deal with advancing and preserving the non-racial character of the ANC.

Pretorius serves in the Portfolio Committee of Sport, Recreation, Arts, and Culture in the Eastern Cape Legislature and is a keen Sport Development Activist.

== Pregnancy and Infant Loss ==
Pretorius moved a motion in the Eastern Cape Provincial Legislature to change laws around foetal burial rights and canvass support for Pregnancy and Infant Loss sufferers, and to ensure that this cause is officially recognised and heralded in October month in the Eastern Cape and South Africa at large in line with the global community.
