= Lido Scarpetti =

Italian politician

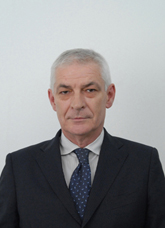

Mayor of Pistoia
- In office 10 November 1992 – 1 March 1994
- Preceded by: Marcello Bucci
- In office 28 June 1994 – 28 May 2002
- Succeeded by: Renzo Berti

Member of the Chamber of Deputies
- In office 29 April 2008 – 14 March 2013

Member of the Senate of the Republic
- In office 28 April 2006 – 28 April 2008

Personal details
- Born: 12 September 1954 (age 71) Arezzo, Italy
- Party: Italian Communist Party (until 1991); Democratic Party of the Left (1991–1998); Democrats of the Left (1998–2007); Democratic Party (2007–2013)

Lido Scarpetti (born 12 September 1954) is an Italian politician who served as mayor of Pistoia (1992–2002), Senator of the Republic (2006–2008), and member of the Chamber of Deputies (2008–2013).
