= Antonije =

Antonije is a Serbian given name. Notable people with this name include the following:

- Antonije Abramović (1919–1996), Montenegrin Eastern Orthodox priest
- Antonije Bagaš (fl. 1366 – 1385), Serbian nobleman
- Antonije Isaković (1923–2002), Serbian writer
- Antonije Pušić, known as Rambo Amadeus, Montenegrin entertainer
- Antonije Ristić-Pljakić, Serbian military leader
- Antonije I Sokolović (died 1574), Serbian Archbishop
- Antonije Znorić (fl. 1689–d. 1695), Serbian military officer

== See also ==
- Antonie (given name)
- Antonija
- Antonijo
- Antonijs
- Ante (given name)
