= Antoniya =

Antoniya is a Russian and Bulgarian feminine given name that is derived from Antonius and is a variant of Antonina in use in Israel, Vietnam, Moldova, Bulgaria, Romania, Hungary, Slovakia, Czech Republic, Poland, Ukraine, Belarus, Lithuania, Latvia, Estonia, Georgia, Azerbaijan, Armenia, Russia, Mongolia, Kazakhstan, Kyrgyzstan, Uzbekistan, Turkmenistan, and Tajikistan. Notable people with this name include the following.

- Antoniya Grigorova (born 1986), Bulgarian cross-country skier
- Antoniya Yordanova (born 1976), Bulgarian long jumper

== See also ==
- Antonia (name)
- Antonida Asonova
- Antonija
- Antonina (name)
- Antoñita (disambiguation)
- Antonya Nelson
