= Nicholas V. Riasanovsky =

Chinese-born American academic

Nicholas Valentine Riasanovsky (born Nicolai Valentinovitch Riasanovskiy; (Note: Russian: Никола́й Валенти́нович Ряза́новский, romanized: Nikolay Valentinovich Ryazanovsky, IPA: [nʲɪkɐˈlaj vəlʲɪnʲˈtʲinəvʲɪtɕ rʲɪˈzanəfskʲɪj].) (December 21, 1923 – May 14, 2011) was a professor at the University of California, Berkeley and the author of numerous books on Russian history and European intellectual history.

== Biography ==
Nicolai Valentinovitch Riasanovskiy was born on 21 December 1923 in Harbin (then in the Republic of China), the son of lawyer Valentin A. Riasanovsky and Antonina Riasanovsky, a novelist. His father, Valentin, was a Russian professor, who had taught at Moscow University, Yaroslavl, Tomsk and Irkutsk and from 1922 to 1934 was teaching at Harbin Normal University (China). His mother, Antonia, was a teacher and novelist who wrote under the pen name Nina Fedorova. In 1938 the family moved to the United States of America, where his father taught at the University of Oregon, and his mother's work The Family, about the life of a Russian community in a Chinese city, received The Atlantic Monthly Prize for fiction in 1940. Nicholas Riasanovsky graduated from the University of Oregon in 1942. During World War II, he trained in Army intelligence at Camp Ritchie and he is considered one of the Ritchie Boys. He received a master's degree from Harvard University in 1947, and a DPhil. from St. John's College, Oxford in 1949 on a Rhodes Scholarship.

From 1949 to 1957 Riasanovsky taught at the University of Iowa. During this time he published Russia in the West in the Teaching of the Slavophiles (1952), and spent a year in Finland as a Fulbright Scholar at the University of Helsinki (1954–1955).

From 1957 until his retirement in 1997 he taught at the University of California, Berkeley, and published Nicholas I and Official Nationality in Russia (1959) and his best-selling A History of Russia (1963). The latter was in its eighth edition in 2010 (now co-authored with Mark D. Steinberg, a former student of Riasanovsky's) and has been acclaimed for its continued comprehensiveness.

Riasanovsky died in Oakland, California, USA, on May 14, 2011, at the age of 87.

== Bibliography ==
- Nicholas I and Official Nationality in Russia, 1825-1855 (1959) online no charge borrow
- A History of Russia 1st ed 1963
  - 2nd ed 1968
  - 3rd ed
  - 4th ed
  - 5th ed
  - Riasanovsky, Nicholas (2000). A History of Russia (6th ed.). Oxford, England: Oxford UP. ISBN 978-0-19-503361-8.
  - 7th ed
  - 8th ed 2010
  - 9th ed 2018
- "Oral history transcript" (1998) online
