= Tonciu =

Tonciu may refer to several villages in Romania:

- Tonciu, a village in Galații Bistriței Commune, Bistrița-Năsăud County
- Tonciu, a village in Fărăgău Commune, Mureș County

== See also ==
- Tonči
