= Sindile Toni =

South African politician

Sindile Toni MPL

Member of the Eastern Cape Provincial Legislature
- Incumbent
- Assumed office 14 June 2024

Personal details
- Party: African National Congress
- Profession: Politician

Sindile Toni is a South African politician who is a first-term member of the Eastern Cape Provincial Legislature for the African National Congress. He was elected in the 2024 provincial election. He chairs the roads and transport portfolio committee in the legislature.

Toni was also elected to the Provincial Executive Committee of the African National Congress at the party's provincial elective conference in May 2022.
