= Vasily Vatagin =

Russian sculptor

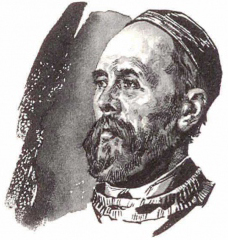
- Born: 20 December 1883; Moscow
- Died: 31 May 1969 (aged 85); Moscow
- Education: Imperial Moscow University (1907)
- Occupation: sculptor

Vasily Alekseyevich Vatagin (20 December 1883 – 31 May 1969) was a scientific illustrator and wildlife artist who worked on a variety of media producing paintings, sculpture, reliefs and illustrations. His works have been used in books and are installed in many institution in Russia. He was a professor at the Moscow Higher School of Arts and Industry.

Vatagin was born in Moscow in the Russian Empire where his father was a school teacher. He studied art in 1898 under N.A. Martynov while studying zoology. He obtained a PhD degree in zoology and studied for two years at the art school of Konstantin Yuon. He then worked with the ornithologist Mikhail Aleksandrovich Menzbier, illustrating his books.

From 1908 he began to work in a range of media and learned sculpture and lithography spending some time in Berlin. He became a member of the Moscow artists association (1911) and the Society of Russian Sculptors. He held his first art exhibition in 1909. He travelled around Europe and Asia and spent some time in India and Ceylon in 1913–1914. He was accompanied by the children's book author Alexander "Cheglok" (born Alexander Usov).

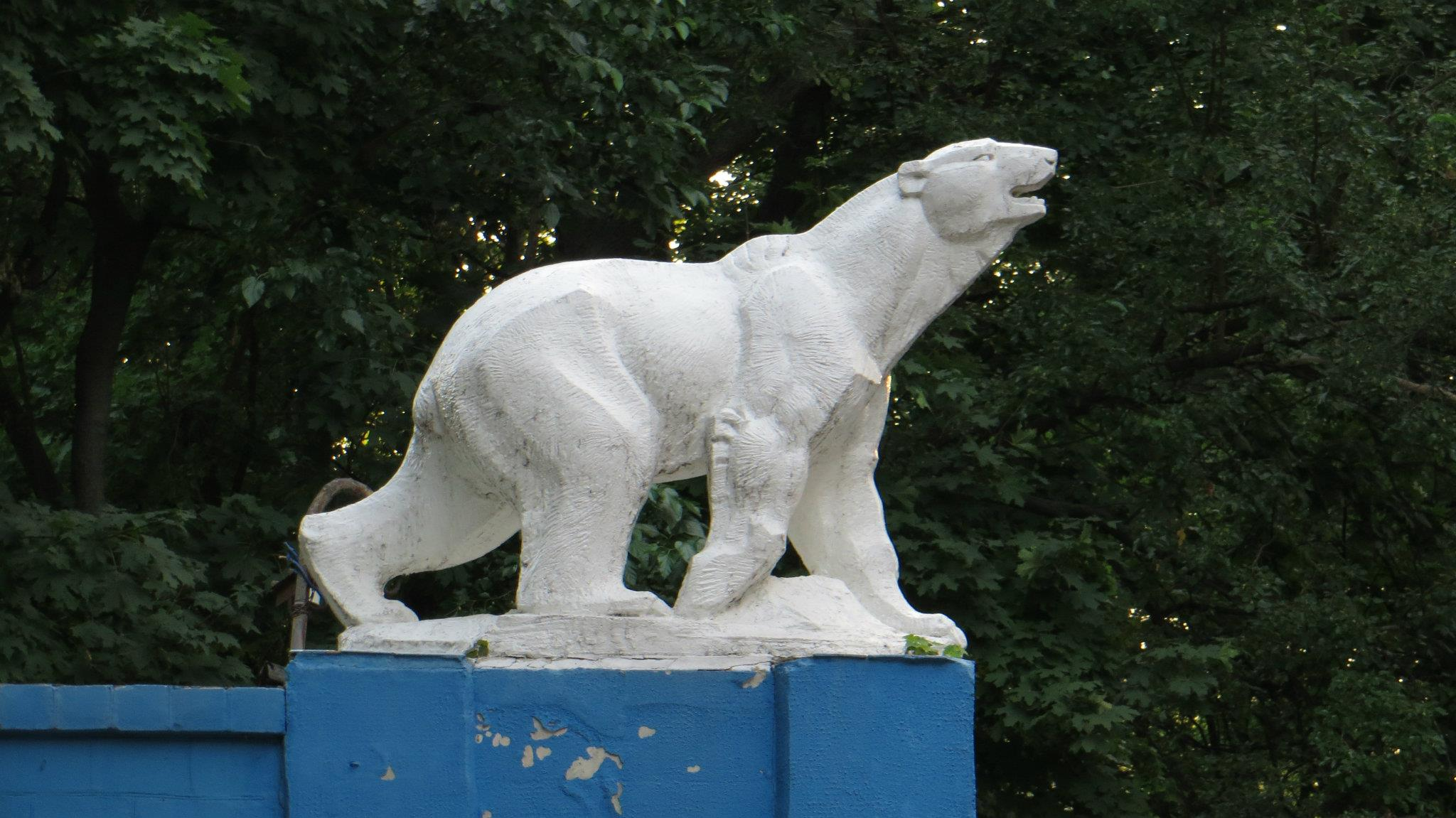
A polar bear by Vatagin, Kharkiv

Vatagin worked on racial and anthropological themes briefly. While in Berlin in 1926 he stayed with Nikolay Timofeev-Ressovsky. Between 1924 and 1929 he produced masks of the people of the Soviet Union for the Moscow Museum of Ethnology.

In 1913, he married Antonina Nikolaevna, daughter of the artist Antonina Rzhevskaya née Popova (1861–1934) and Nikolai Fedorovich Rzhevskij. They had two daughters; Irina and Natalia.

Vatagin illustrated many books written or translated by others. These included the works of Kipling, Tolstoy and Ernest Seton Thompson. He also wrote a book on animal art titled "Image of an Animal. Notes of the Animalist" (1957). He trained many other artists including D. Gorlov, G. Nikolsky, V. Smirin, and V. Trofimov.

At the Moscow State Darwin Museum he produced a number of sculptures and panels under the direction of Aleksandr Kots.

He died on 31 May 1969 in Moscow, and is buried in the city of Tarusa.

== Bibliography ==
- Andreev, A.; Tsygankov, D. (2010). Imperial Moscow University: 1755-1917: encyclopedic dictionary. Moscow: Russian political encyclopedia (ROSSPEN). pp. 124–125. ISBN 978-5-8243-1429-8.
