= Tonči =

Tonči is a Croatian and Slovene masculine given name used as a diminutive form of Anton, Antonij and Antonijo in Croatia and Slovenia. It is sometimes spelled Tonci in Croatia where it is sometimes a diminutive form of Antonio. Notable people with this name include the following:

- Tonči Bašić (born 1974), Croatian footballer
- Tonči Boban (born 1971), Croatian footballer
- Tonči Gabrić (born 1961), Croatian footballer
- Tonči Gulin (1938–1999), Croatian footballer
- Tonči Huljić (born 1961), Croatian musician, songwriter and music producer
- Tonći Kukoč (born 1990), Croatian footballer and nephew of Toni Kukoč
- Tonči Martić (born 1972), Croatian former footballer
- Tonči Matulić (born 1966), Croatian Roman Catholic priest
- Tonći Mujan (born 1995), Croatian footballer
- Tonči Peribonio (born 1960), Croatian team handball player
- Tonći Pirija (born 1980), Croatian footballer
- Tonči Restović (born 1977), Croatian darts player
- Tonči Stipanović (born 1986), Croatian sailor
- Tonči Valčić (born 1978), Croatian handball player
- Tonči Žilić (born 1975), Croatian footballer
- Tonči Zonjić (born 1986), Croatian comic book artist

== See also ==
- Salvatore Tonci (1756–1844), Italian painter, musician, singer and poet
- Tonciu (disambiguation)
