= Toni Schuberl =

German politician (born 1983)

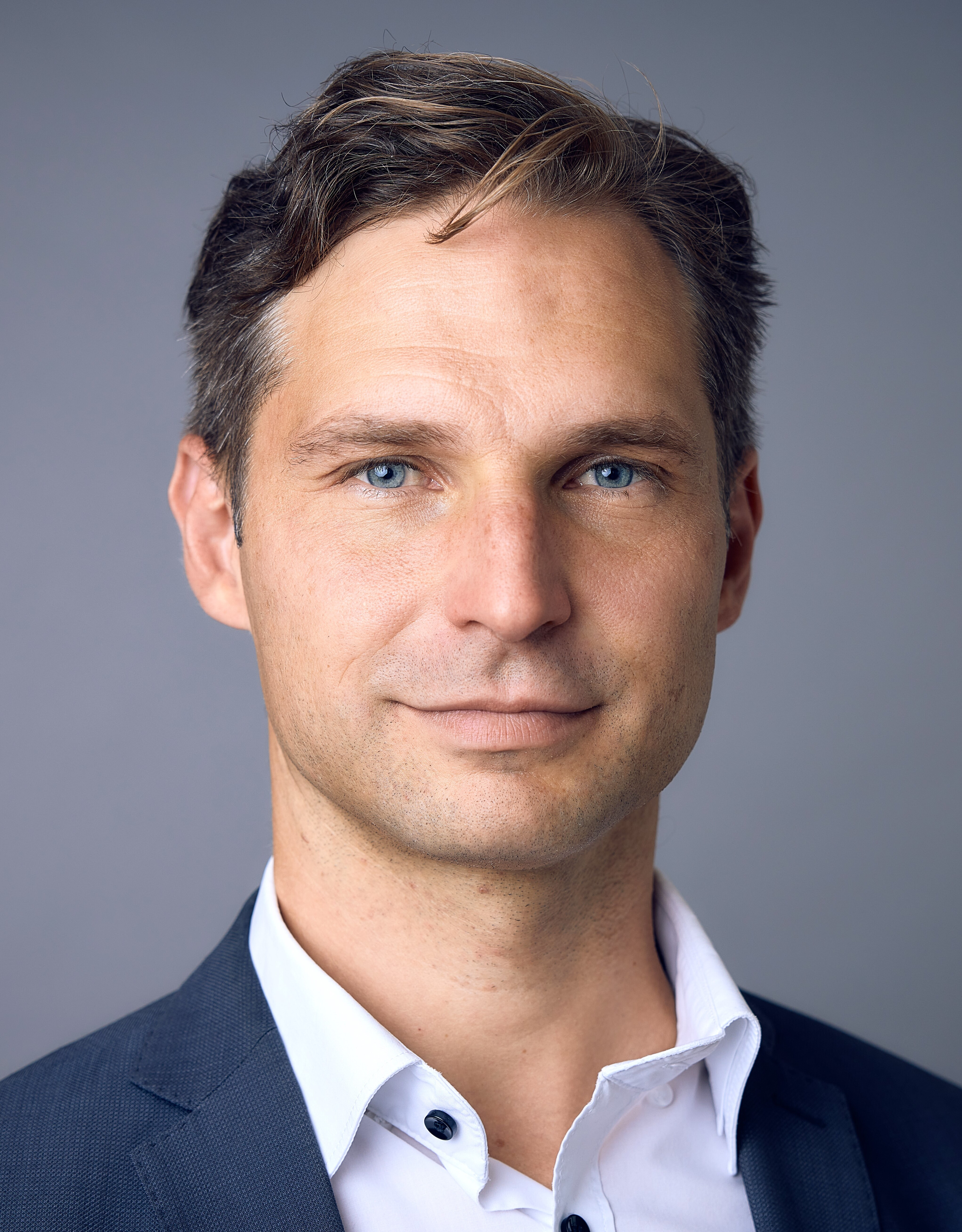
- Schuberl in 2024

Member of the Landtag of Bavaria
- Incumbent
- Assumed office 5 November 2018
- Constituency: Lower Bavaria

Personal details
- Born: 26 January 1983 (age 43)
- Party: Alliance 90/The Greens (since 1999)

Toni Schuberl (born 26 January 1983) is a German politician serving as a member of the Landtag of Bavaria since 2018. He served as chairman of Alliance 90/The Greens in Passau from 2009 to 2010 and from 2012 to 2015.
