= Toni von Langsdorff =

Toni von Langsdorff (30 September 1884 – 24 March 1976) was a German obstetrician/gynecologist known for her work as an early woman doctor and for her role as a pioneer member of the Medical Women's International Association.

== Early life and education ==
Toni von Langsdorff was born on 30 September 1884 in Prussia to a homemaker and a Prussian army officer, the eldest of four children. Though her mother supported her career as a physician, her father was less enthusiastic due to the opposition of his Prussian army colleagues. She cited her sister's experience with spinal tuberculosis, when there was frequently a doctor at the family home, as an inspiration for becoming a physician, a career she saw as a route to independence. von Langsdorff began her undergraduate studies in anatomy at the University of Bonn but was discriminated against for her gender; all women students were classified as "visiting students". She transferred to Heidelberg University after a year at the University of Bonn, and was treated equally there. von Langsdorff took entrance examinations in 1908 to enter the University of Marburg due to the Prussian government's progressive policies regarding women in universities; however, she returned to Heidelberg to study medicine. Despite opposition from an ophthalmology professor who did not support women in medicine, von Langsdorff earned her MD from the University of Heidelberg in 1910.

== Career ==
Facing more opposition, von Langsdorff still found a placement in Essen as a gynecologist in 1910 and received her full medical license in 1911. She continued to practice in Essen until 1918, when she entered private practice because a surgeon in Essen refused to work with her due to her gender. For a time, she practiced with her sister. She retired in 1964, after helping to found the Medical Women's International Association.
