= Francesco Toni =

Italian politician (1921–1991)

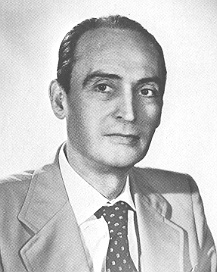

Mayor of Pistoia
- In office 1970–1976
- Preceded by: Corrado Gelli
- Succeeded by: Renzo Bardelli

Member of the Chamber of Deputies
- In office 1976–1983

Personal details
- Born: 9 April 1921 Pistoia, Province of Florence, Kingdom of Italy
- Died: 23 September 1991 (aged 70) Pistoia, Tuscany, Italy
- Party: Italian Communist Party

Francesco Toni (9 April 1921 – 23 September 1991) was an Italian politician who served as mayor of Pistoia from 1970 to 1976 and as member of the Chamber of Deputies from 1976 to 1983.
