= Antonia Goldner =

German politician (born 1981)

Member of the Hamburg Parliament
- Incumbent
- Assumed office 1 September 2025
- Preceded by: Götz T. Wiese

Personal details
- Born: 1 November 1981 (age 44)
- Party: Christian Democratic Union

Antonia-Katharina Goldner (born 1 November 1981) is a German politician serving as a member of the Hamburg Parliament since 2025. She has served as chairwoman of the Mittelstands- und Wirtschaftsunion in Hamburg since 2025.
