= Antonia Laucher =

German soprano (1786–1871)

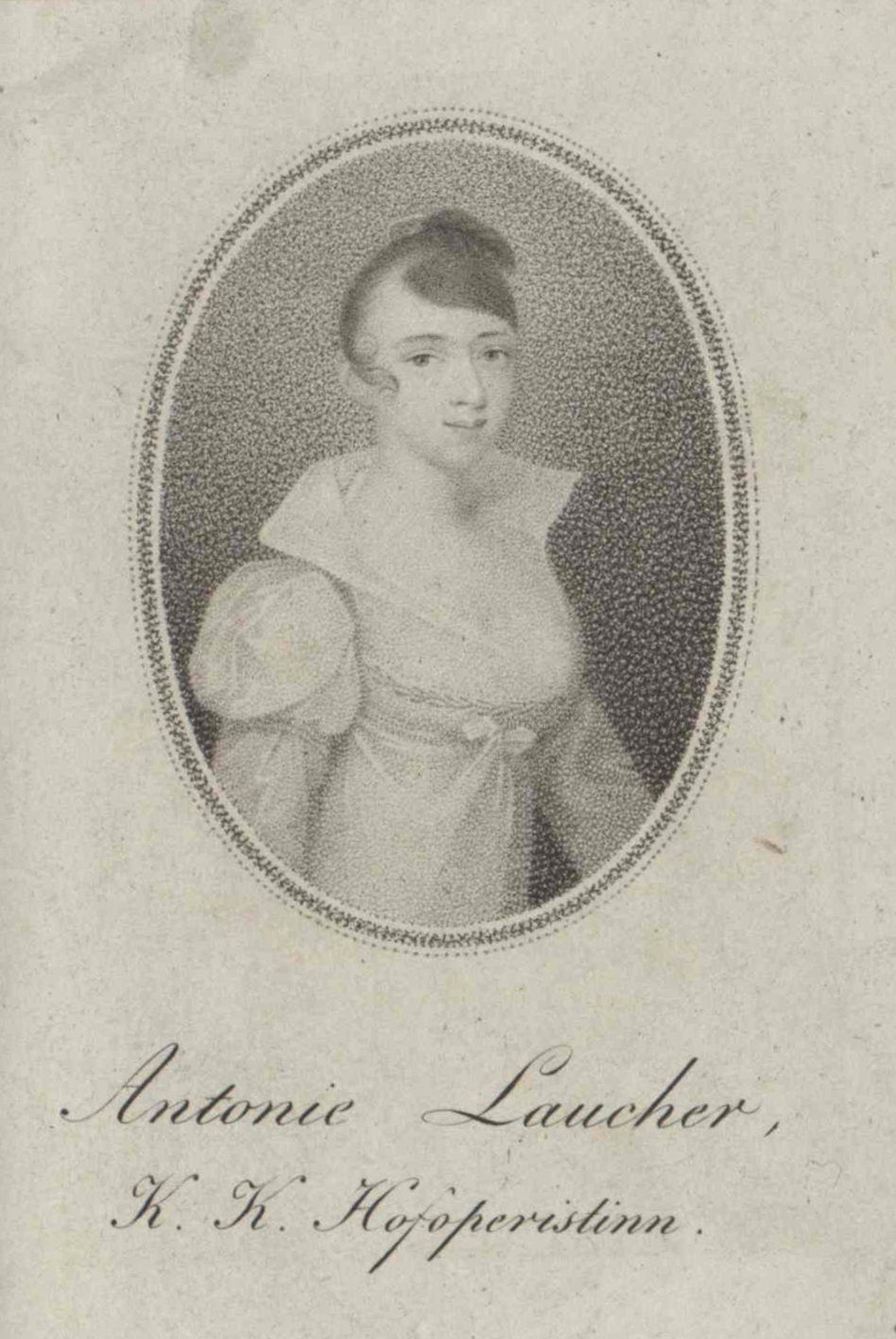
Laucher, before 1808

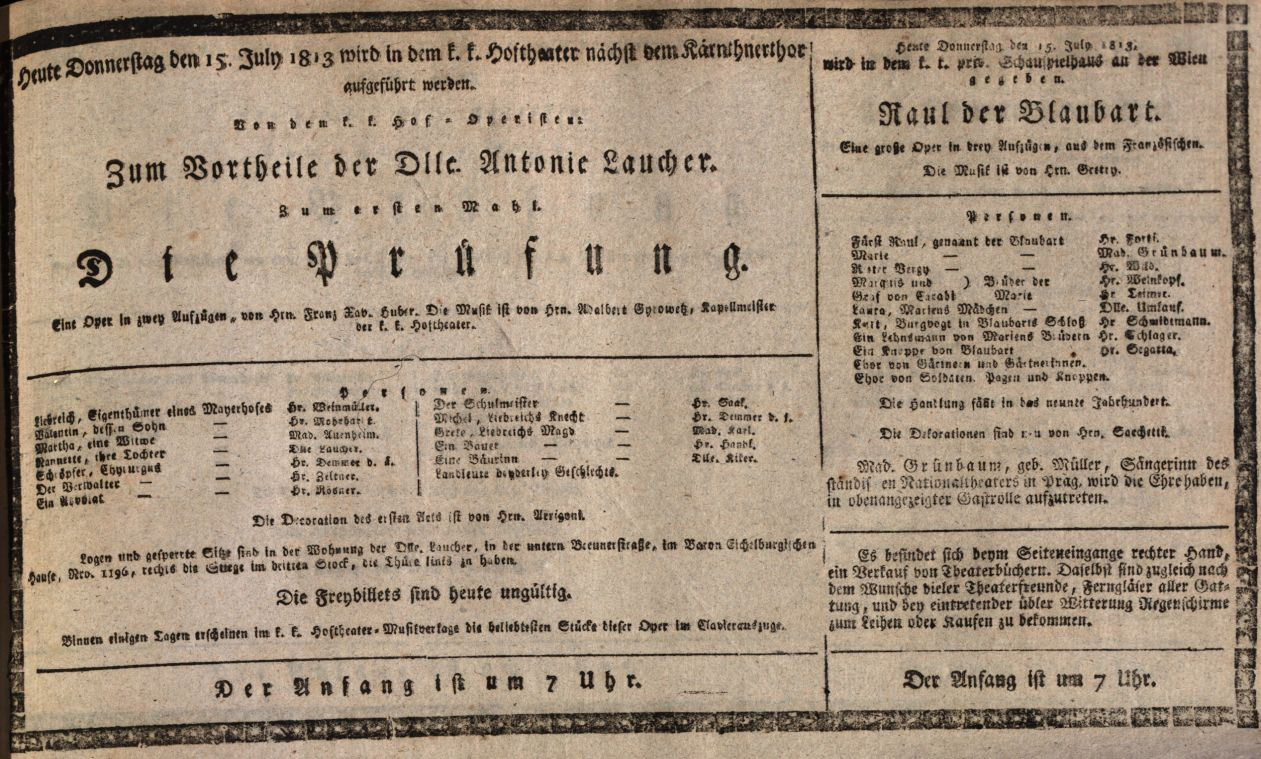
Laucher's upcoming performance in Gyrowetz's Die Prüfung, announced 15 July 1813

Antonia Juliana Laucher (20 June 1786 – 22 August 1871) was a German soprano. She was born in Dillingen an der Donau, and lived most of her life in Vienna.

== Early life ==
Antonia was the daughter of the music educator and church musician Joseph Anton Laucher, and his second wife Maria Kunigunda Laucher. She had her early musical training with her father, before studying under Johann Baptist Lasser (1751–1805) in Munich. Lasser wrote a book for the teaching of female singers, which still survives, giving an insight into the kind of lessons Laucher would have likely received.

== Career ==
After brief involvement in the opera scene in Munich, Laucher moved to Vienna with her younger sister Cäcilia, where they were both employed as singers by the Vienna Court Opera. Because their careers were intertwined, the sisters usually went by their first names Antonia and Cäcilia, and they were also referred to in the press as 'Laucher the elder' and 'Laucher the younger' respectively.

In his memoirs, Johann Gänsbacher reported on a charity concert on 15 November 1804 in the Vienna Redoutensaal, in which Antonia Laucher participated, and claimed to have taught Antonia Laucher singing for two years. Frequent newspaper reports in Vienna document the success of Laucher's career from the beginning of her Vienna career, and also mention her sister frequently.

Between 1805 and 1808 Antonia and Cäcilia Laucher worked together in Salzburg. Antonia appeared in Joseph Haydn's oratorios and Cäcilia in Johann Nepomuk Hummel's cantata Diana ed Endimione.

After her death, it was said that the Emperor Napoleon saw a performance of the opera L'arbore di Diana by Vicente Martín y Soler, at the Schlosstheater Schönbrunn in October 1809. Laucher played the role of Cupid, and reportedly spoke at length to Napoleon after the performance. Napoleon was in Vienna for negotiations after the War of the Fifth Coalition, and the Treaty of Schönbrunn was signed just a few days before this performance.

In 1813 she sang in Brünn, in Adalbert Gyrowetz's Agnes Sorel (based on Agnès Sorel), and Der Augenarzt and in Mozart's Don Giovanni.

Her last known attempt at artistic activity is a brief attempt to establish herself as an actress with theatre appearances in 1822, and after this it is presumed that she was inactive.

== Personal life ==
Laucher is believed to have had illegitimate children, and it is known her sister had at least one illegitimate daughter, Marie Weiler. The sisters were described as having three children between them in 1825, years before Antonia married.

On 16 February 1832, the 45-year-old Antonia Laucher married Gabriel Edlen von Nespern, who was 13 years her junior. According to the marriage register, the couple lived at 966 in Himmelpfortgasse. Her husband died in 1839, and she began a long widowhood while living from her modest pension.

== Death ==
She died in obscurity at the age of 85 in August 1871, having lived since her husband's death in the Hietzing district of Vienna.
