= Antonina Riasanovsky =

American novelist (1895–1985)

- Born: Antonina Fedorovna Podgorinova; March 8, 1895; Lokhvytsia, Russian Empire
- Died: February, 1985; Oakland, California
- Occupation: Writer
- Spouse: Valentin Riasanovsky (m. 1923)
- Children: Nicholas V. Riasanovsky; Aleksandr V. Riasanovsky
- Writing career
- Pen name: Nina Fedorova
- Language: English, Russian

Antonina Riasanovsky (March 8, 1895 – February 1985) was a Russian-born writer who, under the pen name Nina Fedorova, wrote The Family, the tenth highest selling fiction book in the United States 1940. The book won the 1940 $10,000 fiction novel prize from the Atlantic Monthly. The Family tells the story of an exiled White Russian family in Tianjin, China.

== Biography ==
Born Antonina Fedorovna Podgorinova in Lokhvytsia, Russian Empire in 1895, she moved to Verkhneudinsk (now known as Ulan-Ude) after her father's death and mother's remarriage. She left for Harbin in China shortly before the 1917 revolution, and married historian Valentin Riasanovsky in 1923. The Riasanovskys ended up in Tianjin themselves in 1936, though she claimed The Family was not autobiographical. The Riasanovskys came to the United States and moved to Eugene, Oregon in 1938, where Antonina taught Russian literature at the University of Oregon.

A sequel to The Family, The Children, was published in 1942. Her last novel, Life, was written in Russian. She also translated her first two novels into Russian, and published a book of plays for children in 1964.

Riasanovsky and her husband had two sons. Nicholas V. Riasanovsky was a leading scholar of Russian history. She died in Oakland, California in February 1985.

== Works ==
- The Family (1940)
- The Children (1942)
- Theater for Children (1964)
- Life (1964 – 1966)
