= Antonieta Sosa =

Venezuelan artist (born 1940)

- Born: 1940 (age 85–86)
- Occupation: Performance artist

Antonieta Sosa (born 1940) is a Venezuelan performance artist born in New York. Her notable performance works include Conversación con agua tibia (Conversation with Warm Water; 1980) and Del Cuerpo al Vacío (From the Body into the Void; 1985). Her early work includes abstract art pieces such as Visual Chess (1965), which is in the Museum of Modern Art's online collection.
