= Antonia Papandreou =

American electrical engineer

Antonia Papandreou-Suppappola from the Arizona State University, Tempe, AZ was named Fellow of the Institute of Electrical and Electronics Engineers (IEEE) in 2013 for contributions to applications of time-frequency signal processing.
