= Antonieta Figueroa =

Mexican artist (born 1934)

- Born: 1934 (age 91–92)
- Education: La Esmeralda Escuela Nacional de Pintura, Escultura y Grabado
- Known for: Painting

Antonieta Figueroa (born 1934) is a Mexican painter who lives in Mexico City. Figueroa studied at La Esmeralda Escuela Nacional de Pintura, Escultura y Grabado in the late 1950s. She studied under Manuel Rodríguez Lozano and Carlos Orozco Romero.

== Career ==
Figuero had her first solo show in 1970 at the United Nations in Washington, D.C. In 1973 La Galería Arvil exhibited her work and subsequently represented her for the next decade. The Museo de Arte Moderno displayed Figueroa's work in 1981 in an exhibition entitled Correspondencias and published an exhibition catalogue of the same name. Seven years later in 1988 the Museo de Arte Carrillo Gil ran a solo exhibition entitled Horas de agua. Her work is in the permanent collection of several museums, including the Museo Tamayo.
