= Antonina Rzhevskaya =

Russian artist (1861–1934)

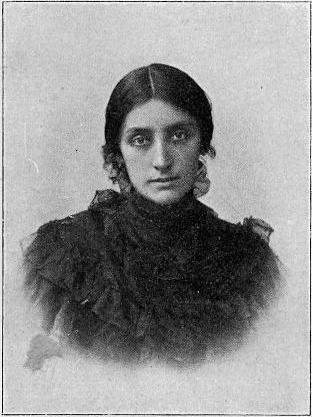
Antonina Rzhevskaya (1901)

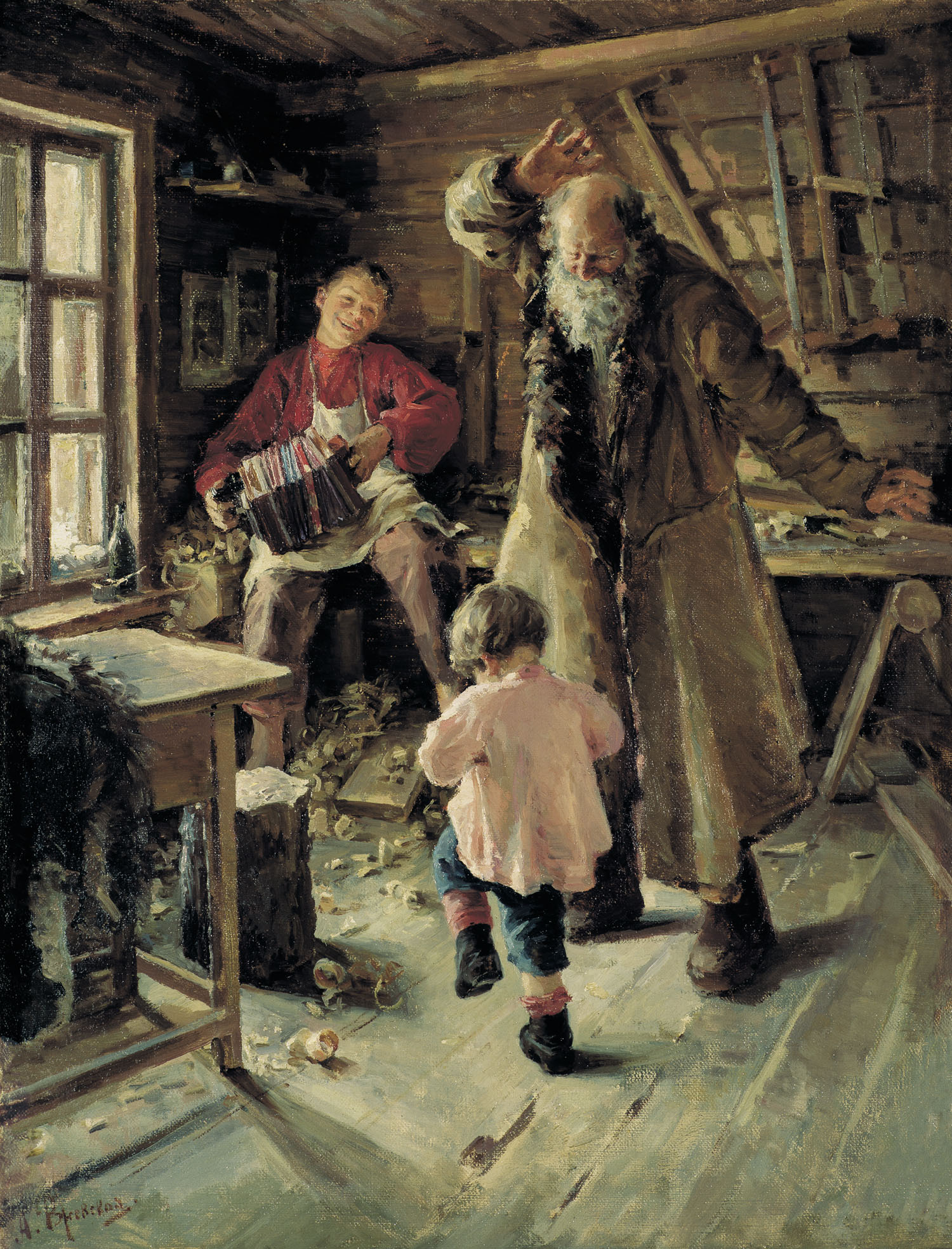
A Merry Moment (1897)

Antonina Leonardovna Rzhevskaya (née Popova; Russian: Антонина Леонардовна Ржевская; 1861– 15 July 1934) also known by masculine pseudonym A. L. Rzhevsky, was a Russian painter, primarily of domestic genre scenes. She was one of the only two women who worked with the Peredvizhniki.

== Biography ==
Antonina Leonardovna Popova was born on 1861 in Shalepnyky, Tver Governorate, Russian Empire; to a family of impoverished noble landowners. After her father's death, her mother took them to Tver, where she entered an all-female grammar school. Later, she attended a gymnasium in Moscow. For a time, she worked as a proofreader to help support her family. In 1880, she began auditing classes at the Moscow School of Painting, Sculpture and Architecture, under the direction of Vladimir Makovsky. She also took private lessons from Nikolai Avenirovich Martynov, set up a studio on a small street and began exhibiting in 1890. Three years later, she had a major showing at an art gallery owned by the publisher, Kozma Soldatyonkov. Makovsky also helped her to find students.

In 1897, she exhibited with the Peredvizhniki at their twenty-fifth exposition and her painting, "A Merry Moment", was acquired by Pavel Tretyakov. At this time, she was concerned about gender bias and signed her paintings as "A.L. Rzhevsky". In 1899, she officially became a member of the Peredvizhniki; only the second (and last) woman to be so accepted. The first was Emiliya Shanks. She later resigned, however, due to disagreements with their program.

She was married to Nikolai Fyodorovich Rzhevsky, who taught at a private girls' school and was a member of the "Imperial Russian Technical Society". At the beginning of World War I, she moved to Tarusa to live with her daughter and new son-in-law, Vasily Vatagin, who would later become a well-known sculptor and animal artist.

In 1920, together with Nikolay Kasatkin, she organized an educational art studio for children who were ill with bone disease and did volunteer work at the Zakhar'in sanatorium, near Khimki, where she also painted frescoes.

She died on 15 July 1934 in Tarusa, Soviet Union.
