= Anttoni =

Anttoni is a Finnish form of the masculine given name Anthony. Notable people with the name include:

- Anttoni Honka
- Anttoni Huttunen

== See also ==
- Antton
- Toini
