= Ana Toni =

Non-profit director

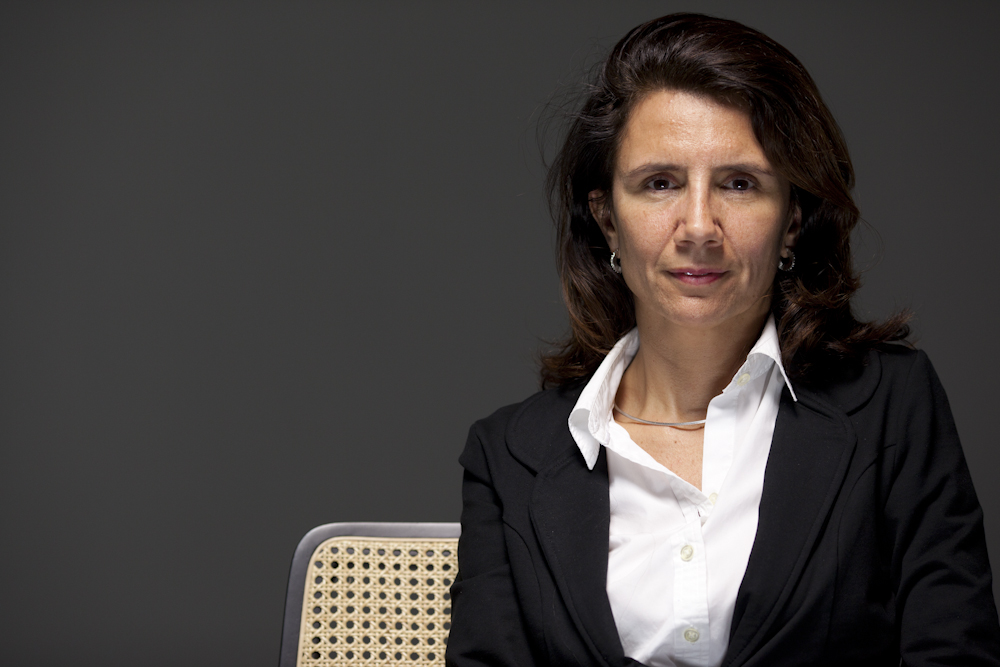
- Ana Toni in 2010
- Education: Swansea University; London School of Economics

Ana Toni is an economist, non-profit director, consultant, and grantmaker. She is currently the National Secretary for Climate Change at Brazil's Ministry of the Environment and Climate Change, and was CEO of COP30 in 2025.

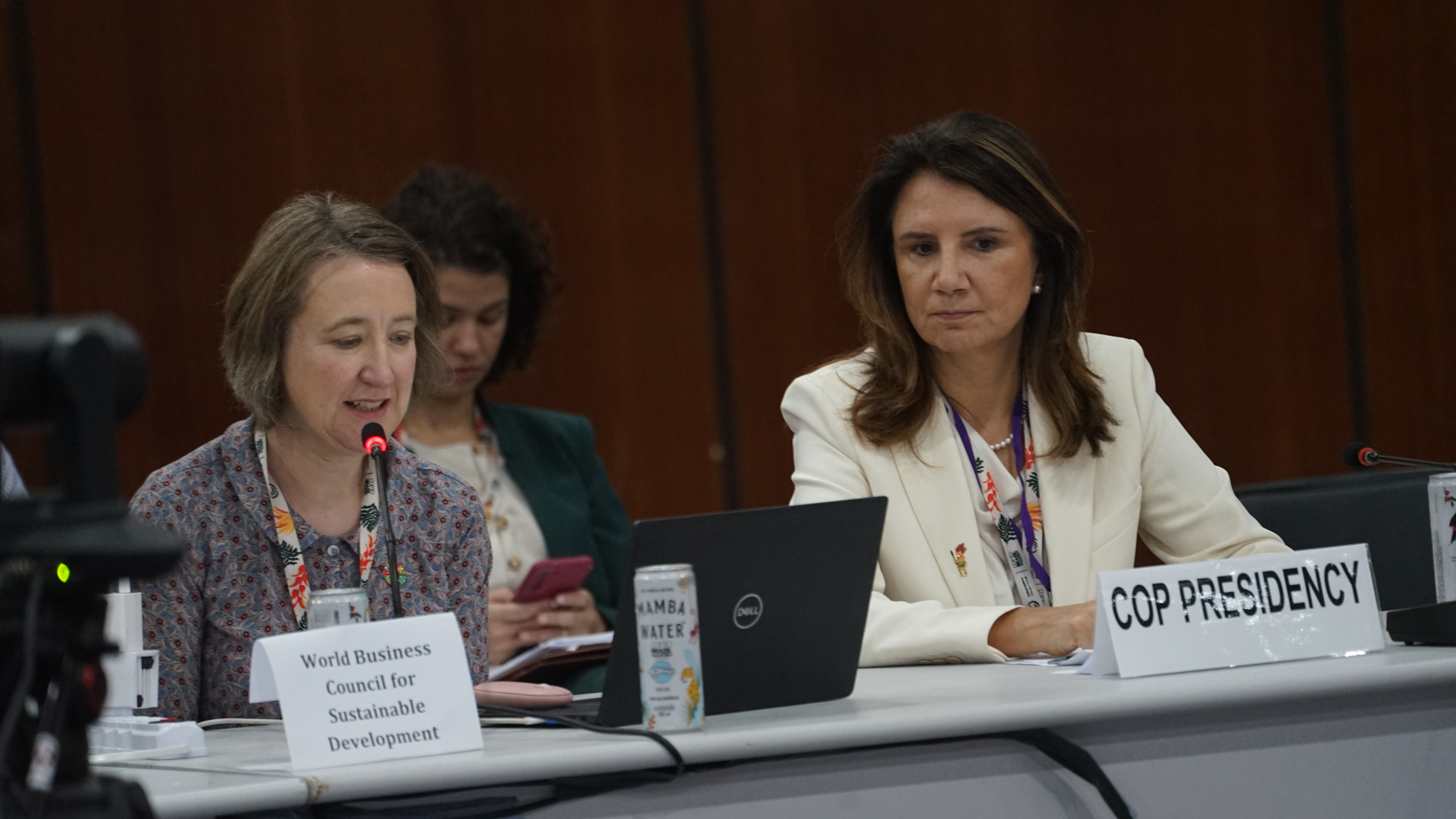
Ana Toni at COP30 (2025)

== Biography ==
Toni studied Economic and Social Studies at Swansea University, and earned a master's degree in Politics of the World Economy at the London School of Economics.

In 1993 she joined Greenpeace, as the International Head of the political unit in Amsterdam, and later as senior advisor to Greenpeace Germany, where she helped develop the first Greenpeace initiatives in the Amazon region. From 2000 to 2003 she was a board member of Greenpeace Brazil.

In 1998 she became the first executive director of ActionAid Brazil, focusing on community development projects and public policy campaigns. She also supported local social investment in Brazil, as a board member of the Brazilian social investment association GIFE.

In 2003 she became the Ford Foundation's representative in Brazil, supporting projects addressing human rights, land rights, discrimination, development, and public media.

Toni was the executive director of the Brazil-based non-profit Instituto Clima e Sociedade [iCS, the Institute for Climate and Society] from 2015 to 2022. From 2010 to 2017 she was the chair of the board of Greenpeace International, and in 2013 she was appointed to the board of the Wikimedia Foundation for one year.

Toni was the first executive director of ActionAid Brazil, and was the Ford Foundation's representative in Brazil from 2003 to 2011. In 2013, she joined the board of the new Baobá Fund for Racial Equity. By 2023, she was National Secretary for Climate Change at Brazil's Ministry of the Environment and Climate Change.

In 2025, Toni was selected by the Brazilian government as the chief executive officer of the 2025 United Nations Climate Change Conference ("COP30").
