= Ante Zelck =

German entrepreneur and hostel pioneer (born 1963)

Ante Zelck (born Andreas Zelck, December 23, 1963) is a German entrepreneur and hostel pioneer.

== Life ==
Ante Zelck was born and raised in Celle, Lower Saxony. After finishing high school, he completed an apprenticeship as a locksmith. In 1988, he went to Berlin to complete his Abitur as a second course of education. During this time, he lived in several occupied houses in the Berlin districts of Mitte and Kreuzberg. After, he studied social education at the First State Technical College for Social Education in Berlin and completed his studies in 1996.

Zelck is the father of one child.

== Professional career ==
After his studies Zelck worked as a social worker for a youth welfare services organization Waschhaus and as a street worker for the outreach project in the Berlin district of Prenzlauer Berg.

In 1994, while he was still completing his studies, he opened Berlin's first hostel, called The backpacker and could be found on the fourth floor of 44 Köthener Straße in Berlin-Kreuzberg.

In May 1997, he opened along with business partner Olaf Juhl Berlin’s Backpackers Hostel (today "baxpax Mitte Hostel") at 102 Chausseestraße in Berlin's Mitte district. He gave up his job as a social worker in order to devote himself full-time to the hostel. In 2000, the two opened the first hostel in Berlin's Kreuzberg district, baxpax Kreuzberg Hostel. In 2006, Zelck and Juhl opened their third hostel, baxpax Downtown Hostel Hotel, located at 28 Ziegelstraße. Located there are also the Bar Cosmo-Lounge and the Optica Club. All three locations, as well as the Lounge and Club, are still operated today by Zelck and Juhl.

== Art and the Hostel Culture ==
From the start, Zelck followed the idea to give the hostels an artistic orientation, and with this conceived the first Design and Art-Hostel-Concept. He consequently implemented this idea for the first time in 2011 with the complete renovation of the baxpax Mitte Hostel. Since the renovation, it is officially known as an Art-Hostel.

Time and time again, Zelck brings art into his hostels. In 2006, he converted a VW beetle into a hostel bed. In the same year he constructed the biggest hostel bed in the world in the courtyard of the baxpax downtown Hostel Hotel. The bed was over 5 meters long. In 2007, a 5-meter-tall (16 ft) Superman statue, which is planted head first into the ground, was also a guest at baxpax downtown Hostel Hotel. All three hostels are regularly used as sites for exhibitions, art, and cultural events.

== Criticism ==
With his provocative advertising campaigns, Zelck has several times attracted the disfavour of the Berlin Hostel Branch. In 1998, he produced postcards on which the Park Inn Hotel was depicted with the label of baxpax Hostel Hotels. Written across the postcards was the phrase, “Only those with a vision will prosper”. As a result, Zelck was accused by several authorities of having delusions of grandeur.

During 2010–2011, Zelck contributed to the discussion about streams of tourists in Berlin-Kreuzberg. He gave interviews where he was constantly advocating for individual tourists. As a result, he incurred the discontent of local residents.
