= Mimobarathra =

Scientific classification
- Domain: Eukaryota
- Kingdom: Animalia
- Phylum: Arthropoda
- Class: Insecta
- Order: Lepidoptera
- Superfamily: Noctuoidea
- Family: Noctuidae
- Genus: Mimobarathra; Barnes & McDunnough, 1915
- Species: M. antonito

Binomial name
- Mimobarathra antonito (Barnes, 1907)

Genus of moths

Mimobarathra is a genus of moths of the family Noctuidae erected by William Barnes and James Halliday McDunnough in 1915. Its only species, Mimobarathra antonito, was first described by Barnes in 1907. It is found in the US state of Arizona.
