= Antonia Wright =

American installation artist (born 1979)

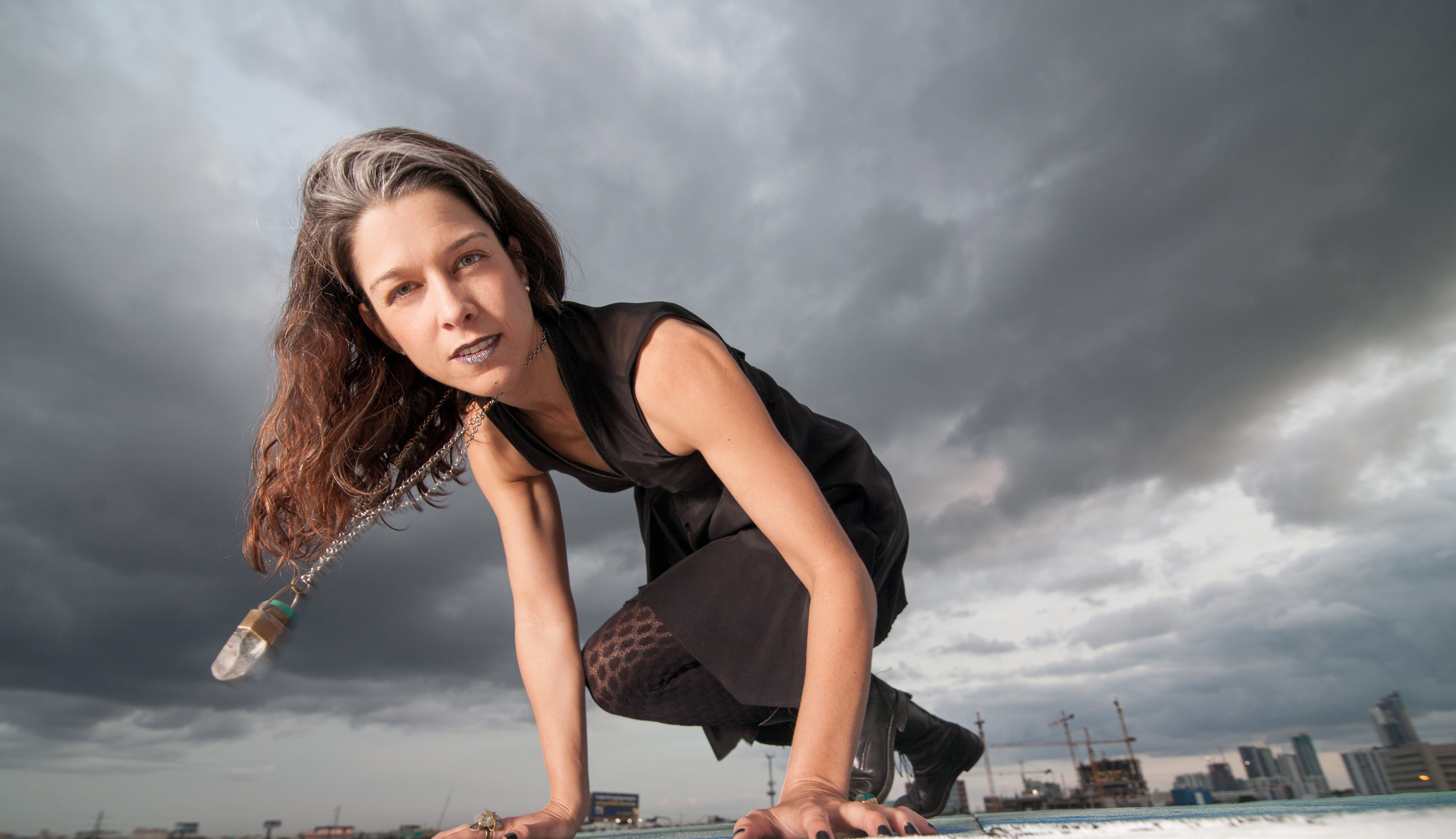
- Antonia Wright by photographer Monica McGivern
- Born: Antonia Wright; 1979 (age 46–47); Miami, Florida, US
- Occupations: Performance artist, poet, photographer, installation and video artist
- Known for: "State of Labor" (2022)
- Website: antoniawright.com

Antonia Wright (born 1979) is a Cuban-American artist born in Miami, Florida. Through a multidisciplinary practice of video, performance, installation, sculpture, sound, and light, Wright responds to extremes of emotion, control, and violence as they relate to systems of power in society. Alpesh Kantilal Patel of Artforum wrote of her work, “the body is the true medium she explores.”

In 2022, she was named one of “11 Artists Leading the Country's Cultural Conversation Right Now” by Gotham Magazine for her work addressing social issues.

== Background and education ==
Antonia Wright received an MFA in Poetry from The New School in 2005 and trained at the International Center of Photography in New York City graduating in 2008.

Wright earned a second MFA in Art Practice from the School of Visual Arts, New York, in 2024.

== Career ==
Since 2009, Wright has been performing an ongoing piece entitled "Are You OK?" wherein she goes into the streets of various cities and cries while capturing the responses of those passing by.

In 2013, Wright created "Be" a video showing the artist covered in 15,000 bees while practicing the movements of tai chi. During Art Basel Miami that same year, Wright threw herself while nude through sheets of glass in "Suddenly We Jumped (Breaking the Glass Ceiling)" at Vizcaya Museum and Gardens inspired by the movement of Futurism.

In 2021, Wright debuted “Not Yet Paved” at Pérez Art Museum Miami, Florida, where she converted a concrete mixer truck into a musical instrument that plays the song "Young, Latin, and Proud" by the musician Helado Negro.

Wright has received reviews in the New York Times and Artforum. Wright serves on the boards of Planned Parenthood North, South and East Florida, The Lotus House Shelter, and Locust Projects.

In 2022, the artist present a public talk to introduce Women in Labor a new digital installation project at Pérez Art Museum Miami, Florida. Wright was in conversation with PAMM assistant curator Maritza Lacayo, and they talked about the role of feminist artists and curators on issues of reproductive freedom in a country post-Roe v. Wade.

== Exhibitions (selection) ==
=== Solo or two-person shows ===
She exhibited the video "Under the Water Was Sand, Then Rocks, Miles of Rocks then Fire" with Luis De Jesus Los Angeles in 2016, depicting the artist walking on and falling into a frozen lake, inspired by her own childhood experience of falling into a frozen reservoir near Boston. The installation included lights on timers night-blooming jasmine plants.

Antonia Wright's 2017 installation Control at Spinello Projects — which involved metal crowd-control barricades — required viewers to sign waivers absolving the gallery from liability should the installation cause any harm. The work was inspired by the prevalence of barricades in Brooklyn, New York, where Wright completed a residency at Pioneer Works.

Wright's solo show “I came to see the damage that was done and the treasures that prevail” at Spinello Projects, Miami, Florida in 2022 was a reaction to the reproductive rights crisis.

In 2024, the Pérez Art Museum Miami featured the one-person presentation Antonia Wright: State of Labor, a sound composition created in response to the United States Supreme Court's 2022 overturning of the 1973 Roe v. Wade landmark decision. Wright's sound art piece is based on data released by the Guttmacher Institute about bodily autonomy and reproductive freedom in the country. The piece comments on the outcomes of the newly reviewed law in estates with current complete or partial bans on abortion care for birthing people. According to the exhibition text, by PAMM curator Maritza Lacayo,"the sounds are as personal as are the real-life effects of the Supreme Court decision." For instance, Wright's work touches on existing data and first-person accounts on one's need to seek out-of-state care, undergo unsafe procedures, carry an unwanted or harmful pregnancy.

=== Group shows ===
Select group exhibitions include “You Know Who You Are: Recent Acquisitions of Cuban Art from the Jorge M Pérez Collection,” El Espacio 23, Miami, FL (2023), “Sinking Feeling” at Or Gallery in Vancouver, Canada (2023), “On the Horizon" at The Frist Art Museum in Nashville, Tennessee (2022), “#fail” at the Contemporary Art Center in New Orleans, Louisiana (2022), “Counter-Landscapes”, Scottsdale Museum of Contemporary Art, Arizona (2019), “Energy Charge: Connecting to Ana Mendieta” at ASU Art Museum.

== Collections ==
Wright's work is in the permanent collection of Martin Z. Margulies, El Espacio 23, The Lotus House Shelter, Pérez Art Museum Miami, The Bass Museum of Art in Miami Beach, and NSU Art Museum in Ft. Lauderdale.

== Awards ==
In the fall of 2015, Wright was an artist-in-residence at Pioneer Works, in Red Hook, Brooklyn.

Wright was one of three to win the Miami New Times's MasterMind award.

In 2022, during Miami Art Week, Antonia Wright along with her long-time collaborator, Ruben Millares, were the winners of the No Vacancy Juror’s Choice Award for their public artwork installed on the beach outside the Faena Hotel.

Wright recently won the Ellies 2022 Creator Award, was named a 2021 CINTAS Foundation Fellowship finalist awarded to artists with Cuban heritage, and won a 2019-2020 South Florida Cultural Consortium Award. She has been featured in New York Magazine's article, "The New Talent Show: Pot-Luck Culture" on the burgeoning salon scene in New York City.

== Legacy ==
In April 2012, Wright established an artist-in-residence program at Lotus House Shelter, in Miami, Florida. The artist lived there for one month.
