= De Toni =

de Toni (sometimes capitalized as "De Toni") is an Italian surname. Notable people with the surname include:

- Giovanni Battista de Toni (1864–1924), Italian botanist, mycologist, and phycologist
- Manuel de Toni (born 1979), Italian ice hockey player
- Lino De Toni (born 1972), Italian ice hockey player
- Caroline de Toni (born 1986), member of the Chamber of Deputies of Brazil
- Simon de Tosny, also spelled Toni, 12th-century English Cistercian monk and prelate, Abbot of Coggeshall and Bishop of Moray

== See also ==
- Toni (surname)
