= Toni Lopes =

Portuguese footballer (born 1979)

Toni
Personal information
- Full name: António Pedro de Brito Lopes
- Date of birth: 23 July 1979 (age 47)
- Place of birth: Setúbal, Portugal
- Height: 1.75 m (5 ft 9 in)
- Position: Right-back

Youth career
- 1990–1994: Pelezinhos
- 1994–1998: Vitória Setúbal

Senior career*
Years	Team	Apps	(Gls)
1998–2000	Lusitano Évora	33	(0)
2000–2001	Farense	25	(0)
2001–2002	Benfica B	2	(0)
2002–2004	Benfica	1	(0)
2002–2004	→ Beira Mar (loan)	36	(0)
2004–2005	Servette	7	(0)
2006–2007	Zamora	34	(0)
2008–2009	Ethnikos Achna	34	(0)
2009–2013	Apollon Limassol	112	(3)
2013–2014	AEK Larnaca	24	(0)
2014–2015	Ermis	15	(0)

International career
2001	Portugal U21	2	(0)
2003	Portugal B	1	(0)
- * Club domestic league appearances and goals as of 24 May 2015

António Pedro de Brito Lopes (born 23 July 1979), commonly known as Toni, is a Portuguese professional footballer who plays as a right-back.

After starting out professionally at Farense, he went on to represent Benfica and Beira Mar in the Primeira Liga, signing with the former in 2002. He also competed in Switzerland, Spain and Cyprus, spending eight seasons in the latter nation, mostly with Apollon Limassol.

== Club career ==
Born in Setúbal, Toni grew up in the neighbourhood of Bela Vista and started playing football at local Clube Desportivo Pelezinhos. He signed for neighbouring Vitória F.C. at the age of 15, where he finished his formation. His beginnings as a senior were spent with Lusitano G.C. in the fourth level, which he helped finish fourth in his first season and second in the following, with the subsequent promotion in the latter case.

In July 2000, Toni moved to the Primeira Liga and joined S.C. Farense. He made his debut in the competition on 29 October of that year, coming on as a second-half substitute and assisting for the second goal in a 2–1 away win against C.F. Estrela da Amadora. His performances soon attracted interest from S.C. Braga and Sevilla FC, and he was also linked with Southampton, Paris Saint-Germain F.C. and West Ham United towards the start and during the off-season, but ultimately signed with S.L. Benfica on a reported free deal.

However, it was soon discovered that Toni had signed with an investment firm, Premier Holding owned by Mike Walsh. They retained his international certificate and did not allowed him to play for Benfica until they received 650 thousand dollars. Only in January 2002, after FIFA intervened, was he allowed to play, first in the reserve team and then in the main squad, making his first and only appearance for the latter on the last matchday of the campaign and being sent off in the last minutes of a 2–3 away loss against C.S. Marítimo.

In July 2002, both Toni and Diogo Luís joined fellow league club S.C. Beira-Mar as Cristiano Roland moved in the opposite direction. He was regularly used as a starter in his first season but, in 2003–04, he appeared much more sparingly after losing his place to Pedro Ribeiro.

In the 2004 summer, aged 25, Toni moved abroad where he would remain until his retirement. His first stop was Servette FC in the Swiss Super League, and the second Zamora CF of the Spanish Segunda División B.

From 2007–08 onwards, Toni competed in the Cypriot First Division, where he appeared for Ethnikos Achna FC, Apollon Limassol, AEK Larnaca F.C. and Ermis Aradippou. With the second side, he won the 2012–13 Cypriot Cup.

== International career ==
Toni represented the Portugal national team three times, gaining two caps for the under-21s and one for the B-side. All his appearances were friendlies, against Norway, Belarus and United States.

== Career statistics ==
As of 24 May 2015

Appearances and goals by club, season and competition
Club	Season	League			Cup		Other		Total	
Club	Season	Division	Apps	Goals	Apps	Goals	Apps	Goals	Apps	Goals
Farense	2000–01	Primeira Liga	25	0	3	0	—		28	0
Benfica	2001–02	Primeira Liga	1	0	0	0	0	0	1	0
Beira-Mar	2002–03	Primeira Liga	25	0	1	0	—		26	0
Beira-Mar	2003–04	Primeira Liga	11	0	1	0	—		12	0
Beira-Mar	Total		36	0	2	0	—		38	0
Servette	2004–05	Swiss Super League	7	0			—		7	0
Zamora	2006–07	Segunda División B	34	0	0	0	—		34	0
Ethnikos Achna	2007–08	Cypriot First Division	3	0			—		3	0
Ethnikos Achna	2008–09	Cypriot First Division	31	0			—		31	0
Ethnikos Achna	Total		34	0			—		34	0
Apollon Limassol	2009–10	Cypriot First Division	24	1			—		24	1
Apollon Limassol	2010–11	Cypriot First Division	24	1	1	0	1 (Note: Appearances in UEFA Europa League)	0	26	1
Apollon Limassol	2011–12	Cypriot First Division	28	1	2	0	—		30	1
Apollon Limassol	2012–13	Cypriot First Division	28	0	6	0	—		34	0
Apollon Limassol	Total		104	3	9	0	1	0	114	3
AEK Larnaca	2013–14	Cypriot First Division	24	0	4	0	—		28	0
Ermis	2014–15	Cypriot First Division	15	0	3	0	—		18	0
Career total			280	3	21	0	1	0	301	3
