= Antonijo =

Antonijo is a Croatian and Slovene given name. Notable people with this name include the following:

- Antonijo Ježina (born 1989), Croatian football
- Antonijo Pranjič (born 1985), Slovenian footballer
- Antonijo Zupan (born 1976), Croatian footballer

== See also ==
- Antonija
- Antonije
- Antonijs
- Antonino (name)
- Antonio
- Antoñito (name)
