= Antonida Asonova =

Kazakhstani ice hockey player

- Born: 24 August 1979 (age 47) Alma-Ata, Kazakh SSR, Soviet Union
- Height: 169 cm (5 ft 7 in)
- Weight: 63 kg (139 lb; 9 st 13 lb)
- Position: Defence
- Shot: Left
- National team: Kazakhstan
- Playing career: 2000–2002

Antonida Asonova (Russian: Антонида Владимировна Асонова; born 24 August 1979) is a Kazakhstani ice hockey player. She competed in the women's tournament at the 2002 Winter Olympics.
