= 2024 South African provincial elections =

Map of the 2024 South African provincial elections shaded by winning party and with seats illustrated.

This article summarizes the results of the 29 May 2024 South African provincial elections which were held concurrently with the general election. Voter turnout across the 232,292 voting districts was 58.6 percent.

== Eastern Cape ==
Party	Votes	%	+/–	Seats	+/–
African National Congress	1,114,294	62.16	▼6.58	45	▲1
Democratic Alliance	267,007	14.89	▼0.84	11	▲1
Economic Freedom Fighters	181,855	10.14	▲2.30	8	▲3
United Democratic Movement	66,572	3.71	▲1.11	3	▲1
Patriotic Alliance	41,355	2.31	New	2	▲2
African Transformation Movement	27,761	1.55	▲0.03	1	0
uMkhonto we Sizwe	25,904	1.44	New	1	New
Freedom Front Plus	9,321	0.52	▼0.06	1	0
Pan Africanist Congress of Azania	9,168	0.51	▲0.10	0	0
African Christian Democratic Party	8,642	0.48	▲0.01	0	0
ActionSA	8,315	0.46	New	0	New
Rise Mzansi	5,167	0.29	New	0	New
African Independent Congress	3,935	0.22	▼0.20	0	0
Azanian People's Organisation	3,884	0.22	▲0.14	0	0
Build One South Africa	3,138	0.18	New	0	New
Congress of the People	2,178	0.12	▼0.13	0	0
Batho Pele Movement	2,078	0.12	New	0	New
African People's Convention	1,770	0.10	▼0.03	0	–
Good	1,683	0.09	▼0.15	0	0
Al Jama-ah	1,543	0.09	▼0.06	0	0
Alliance of Citizens for Change	1,511	0.08	New	0	0
Inkatha Freedom Party	1,343	0.07	▲0.02	0	0
Arise South Africa	1,128	0.06	New	0	0
African Congress for Transformation	1,047	0.06	New	0	0
Komani Progress Action	976	0.05	New	0	0
Independent South African National Civic Organisation	877	0.05	New	0	0
African Movement Congress	269	0.02	New	0	0
Total	1,792,721	100.00	–	72	–

== Free State ==
Party	Votes	%	+/–	Seats	+/–
African National Congress	429,241	51.87	▼9.27	16	▼3
Democratic Alliance	181,062	21.88	▲4.30	7	▲1
Economic Freedom Fighters	111,850	13.52	▲0.94	4	0
Freedom Front Plus	24,933	3.01	▼0.95	1	0
uMkhonto weSizwe	15,985	1.93	New	1	New
African Congress for Transformation	15,120	1.83	New	1	New
Patriotic Alliance	11,730	1.42	▲0.86	0	0
African Transformation Movement	5,874	0.71	▼0.07	0	0
ActionSA	4,503	0.54	New	0	New
African Content Movement	4,414	0.53	▲0.32	0	0
African Christian Democratic Party	3,967	0.48	▲0.06	0	0
Build One South Africa	2,916	0.35	New	0	New
Rise Mzansi	2,348	0.28	New	0	New
Pan Africanist Congress of Azania	1,970	0.24	▲0.07	0	0
Congress of the People	1,860	0.22	▼0.23	0	0
Inkatha Freedom Party	1,537	0.19	▲0.11	0	0
Arise South Africa	1,453	0.18	New	0	New
United Africans Transformation	1,408	0.17	New	0	New
Forum 4 Service Delivery	1,193	0.14	New	0	New
United Democratic Movement	986	0.12	▲0.03	0	0
African People's Convention	672	0.08	▼0.07	0	0
Abantu Batho Congress	560	0.07	New	0	New
Sesing Johannes Ramotswabodi	558	0.07	New	0	New
Good	483	0.06	▼0.02	0	0
All Citizens Party	469	0.06	New	0	New
National Freedom Party	241	0.03	0.00	0	0
African Movement Congress	179	0.02	New	0	New
Total	827,512	100.00	–	30	–
Valid votes	827,512	99.01			
Invalid/blank votes	8,280	0.99			
Total votes	835,792	100.00			
Registered voters/turnout	1,456,927	57.37			
Source: Electoral Commission of South Africa

== Gauteng ==
Party	Votes	%	+/–	Seats	+/–
African National Congress	1,367,248	34.76	▼15.43	28	▼9
Democratic Alliance	1,079,229	27.44	▼0.02	22	▲2
Economic Freedom Fighters	508,390	12.93	▼1.74	11	0
uMkhonto we Sizwe	384,968	9.79	New	8	New
ActionSA	163,541	4.16	New	3	New
Freedom Front Plus	91,521	2.33	▼2.23	2	▼1
Patriotic Alliance	79,964	2.03	▲1.99	2	▲2
Rise Mzansi	38,496	0.98	New	1	New
Inkatha Freedom Party	34,250	0.87	▼0.02	1	0
Build One South Africa	29,978	0.76	New	1	New
African Christian Democratic Party	29,163	0.74	▲0.03	1	0
Al Jama-ah	14,675	0.37	▲0.19	0	0
African Transformation Movement	11,419	0.29	▲0.04	0	0
Pan Africanist Congress of Azania	11,227	0.29	▲0.05	0	0
United Africans Transformation	9,220	0.23	New	0	New
Hope4SA	8,748	0.22	New	0	New
United Democratic Movement	7,567	0.19	▼0.02	0	0
Arise SA	5,723	0.15	New	0	New
Good	5,307	0.13	▼0.07	0	0
Congress of the People	5,151	0.13	▼0.11	0	0
Azanian People's Organisation	4,877	0.12	▲0.04	0	0
African Independent Congress	4,371	0.11	▼0.10	0	0
Allied Movement for Change	4,348	0.11	New	0	New
African Heart Congress	3,938	0.10	New	0	New
Basic Income Grant SA	3,079	0.08	New	0	New
South African Rainbow Alliance	2,745	0.07	New	0	New
Action Alliance Development Party	2,716	0.07	New	0	New
Operation Dudula	2,664	0.07	New	0	New
African Congress for Transformation	2,384	0.06	New	0	New
African People's Convention	2,308	0.06	▲0.01	0	0
Economic Liberators Forum South Africa	1,512	0.04	New	0	New
Alliance of Citizens for Change	1,482	0.04	New	0	New
Forum for Service Delivery	1,322	0.03	New	0	New
Africa Restoration Alliance	1,284	0.03	New	0	New
National Freedom Party	1,248	0.03	▼0.04	0	0
Africa Africans Reclaim	1,239	0.03	New	0	New
Xiluva	980	0.02	New	0	New
Sizwe Ummah Nation	810	0.02	New	0	New
Bolsheviks Party of South Africa	797	0.02	New	0	New
Azania Peaceful Revolution	794	0.02	New	0	New
African Independent People's Organisation	727	0.02	New	0	New
Mogano Tshepo Johannes	650	0.02	New	0	New
Cibi Bonganni Wellington	503	0.01	New	0	New
African People First	407	0.01	New	0	New
African Movement Congress	277	0.01	New	0	New
Total	3,933,247	100.00	–	80	–
Valid votes	3,933,247	99.15			
Invalid/blank votes	33,794	0.85			
Total votes	3,967,041	100.00			
Registered voters/turnout	6,541,978	60.64			
Source: Electoral Commission of South Africa

== KwaZulu-Natal ==
Results by municipality MK-30-40% MK-40-50% MK-50-60% MK-60-70% IFP-40-50% IFP-50-60% IFP-70-80% ANC-50-60% DA-40-50%

Party	Votes	%	+/–	Seats	+/–
uMkhonto we Sizwe	1,590,813	45.35	New	37	New
Inkatha Freedom Party	633,771	18.07	▲2.73	15	▲2
African National Congress	595,958	16.99	▼27.23	14	▼30
Democratic Alliance	468,515	13.36	▼0.54	11	0
Economic Freedom Fighters	79,211	2.26	▼7.65	2	▼6
National Freedom Party	19,548	0.56	▼1.01	1	0
Moodley Thanasagren Rubbanathan	12,323	0.35	New	0	New
African Christian Democratic Party	11,366	0.32	▼0.16	0	▼1
ActionSA	9,569	0.27	New	0	New
Allied Movement for Change	8,007	0.23	New	0	New
Patriotic Alliance	7,843	0.22	New	0	New
African Transformation Movement	6,477	0.18	▼0.31	0	▼1
Democratic Liberal Congress	6,126	0.17	▼0.21	0	0
Al Jama-ah	6,012	0.17	▼0.11	0	0
Freedom Front Plus	5,638	0.16	▼0.15	0	0
Build One South Africa	4,648	0.13	New	0	New
African People's Movement	4,117	0.12	New	0	New
Rise Mzansi	3,898	0.11	New	0	New
Pan Africanist Congress of Azania	3,817	0.11	▲0.04	0	0
Justice and Employment Party	3,626	0.10	▼0.13	0	0
Congress of the People	3,615	0.10	▼0.04	0	0
Abantu Batho Congress	3,214	0.09	New	0	New
People's Freedom Party	3,162	0.09	New	0	New
Sizwe Ummah Nation	2,731	0.08	New	0	New
United Democratic Movement	2,565	0.07	▼0.03	0	0
African Independent Congress	2,527	0.07	▼0.19	0	0
African Movement Congress	2,049	0.06	New	0	New
Good	2,005	0.06	▼0.05	0	0
Arise SA	1,958	0.06	New	0	New
African People First	1,007	0.03	New	0	New
Economic Liberators Forum South Africa	679	0.02	New	0	New
All Citizens Party	631	0.02	New	0	New
Africa Restoration Alliance	629	0.02	New	0	New
Total	3,508,055	100.00	–	80	–
Valid votes	3,508,055	98.88			
Invalid/blank votes	39,761	1.12			
Total votes	3,547,816	100.00			
Registered voters/turnout	5,738,249	61.83			
Source: Electoral Commission of South Africa

== Limpopo ==
Results by municipality

ANC-50-60%
ANC-60-70%
ANC-70-80%
ANC-80-90%

Party	Votes	%	+/–	Seats	+/–
African National Congress	1,037,627	73.30	▼1.19	48	▲10
Economic Freedom Fighters	199,900	14.12	▼0.31	9	▲2
Democratic Alliance	84,388	5.96	▲0.56	4	▲2
Freedom Front Plus	15,393	1.09	▼0.33	1	Steady
uMkhonto we Sizwe	12,027	0.85	New	1	New
United Africans Transformation	11,653	0.82	New	1	New
ActionSA	9,180	0.65	New	0	New
African Christian Democratic Party	4,810	0.34	▼0.37	0	–
Action Alliance Development Party	4,448	0.31	New	0	New
Build One South Africa	3,706	0.26	New	0	New
Pan Africanist Congress	3,332	0.24	▲0.09	0	Steady
Bolsheviks Party of South Africa	3,186	0.23	▲0.09	0	Steady
African People's Convention	2,692	0.19	▼0.17	0	Steady
Congress of the People	2,357	0.17	▼0.06	0	Steady
Patriotic Alliance	2,272	0.16	New	0	New
Arise South Africa	2,179	0.15	New	0	New
Rise Mzansi	2,123	0.15	New	0	New
Able Leadership	1,834	0.13	New	0	New
Economic Liberators Forum South Africa	1,655	0.12	New	0	New
Forum for Service Delivery	1,403	0.10	New	0	New
Socialist Agenda of Dispossessed Africans	1,300	0.09	New	0	New
South African Maintenance and Estate Beneficiaries Association	1,242	0.09	New	0	New
African Transformation Movement	1,204	0.09	▼0.19	0	Steady
United Democratic Movement	905	0.06	▼0.03	0	Steady
Inkatha Freedom Party	890	0.06	▲0.01	0	Steady
Operation Dudula	736	0.05	New	0	New
South African Rainbow Alliance	686	0.05	New	0	New
All Citizens Party	637	0.04	New	0	New
National Independent Party	439	0.03	New	0	New
Lovemore N'dou	425	0.03	New	0	New
Good	317	0.02	▼0.01	0	Steady
Makonyane Matsobane Gerald	277	0.02	New	0	New
Al Jama-ah	243	0.02	New	0	New
African Movement Congress	129	0.01	New	0	New
Total	1,415,595	100.00	–	64	–
Valid votes	1,415,595	99.04			
Invalid/blank votes	13,791	0.96			
Total votes	1,429,386	100.00			
Registered voters/turnout	2,779,657	51.42			
Source: Independent Electoral Commission, Daily Maverick and News24

== Mpumalanga ==
Party	Votes	%	Seats
African National Congress	584,609	51.31	27
uMkhonto weSizwe	193,995	17.03	9
Economic Freedom Fighters	158,511	13.91	7
Democratic Alliance	137,408	12.06	6
Freedom Front Plus	17,514	1.54	1
ActionSA	5,727	0.50	1
United Africans Transformation	5,512	0.48	0
African Christian Democratic Party	5,401	0.47	0
Inkatha Freedom Party	5,352	0.47	0
African Transformation Movement	4,918	0.43	0
African Independent People's Organisation	4,004	0.35	0
African People's Convention	3,542	0.31	0
Patriotic Alliance	1,911	0.17	0
Rise Mzansi	2,189	0.19	0
Build One South Africa	2,147	0.19	0
Pan Africanist Congress of Azania	1,811	0.16	0
Bolsheviks Party of South Africa	1,064	0.09	0
United Democratic Movement	916	0.08	0
Sindawonye Progressive Party	793	0.07	0
Good	501	0.04	0
Economic Liberators Forum	480	0.04	0
National Freedom Party	443	0.04	0
Able Leadership	258	0.02	0
Africa Restoration Alliance	258	0.02	0
African Movement Congress	163	0.01	0
Total	1,139,427	100.00	51

== Northern Cape ==
Party	Votes	%	Seats
African National Congress	195,267	49.34	15
Democratic Alliance	83,848	21.19	7
Economic Freedom Fighters	52,433	13.25	4
Patriotic Alliance	34,180	8.64	3
Freedom Front Plus	7,239	1.83	1
Northern Cape Communities Movement	6,547	1.65	–
uMkhonto weSizwe	3,111	0.79	–
ActionSA	2,015	0.51	–
Good	1,849	0.47	–
#Hope4SA	1,745	0.44	–
African Christian Democratic Party	1,498	0.38	–
Congress of the People	1,007	0.25	–
Build One South Africa	995	0.25	–
Pan Africanist Congress of Azania	701	0.18	–
Rise Mzansi	627	0.16	–
Africa Restoration Alliance	458	0.12	–
African Congress for Transformation	453	0.11	–
Arise South Africa	418	0.11	–
African Transformation Movement	412	0.10	–
Inkatha Freedom Party	303	0.08	–
People's Movement for Change	188	0.05	–
South African Royal Kingdoms Association	177	0.04	–
All Citizens Party	173	0.04	–
South African Youth Power Party	138	0.03	–
Total	395,782	100.00	30
Source: Electoral Commission of South Africa

== North West ==
Party	Votes	%	+/–	Seats	+/–
African National Congress	510,994	57.73	▼4.03	23	▼2
Economic Freedom Fighters	153,743	17.37	▼1.27	7	▲1
Democratic Alliance	117,168	13.24	▲2.06	5	▲1
Freedom Front Plus	23,003	2.60	▼1.72	1	▼1
uMkhonto we Sizwe	18,198	2.06	New	1	New
ActionSA	15,053	1.70	New	1	New
Patriotic Alliance	8,040	0.91	▲0.88	0	Steady
Forum for Service Delivery	5,143	0.58	▲0.25	0	Steady
United Africans Transformation	4,779	0.54	New	0	New
African Christian Democratic Party	3,941	0.45	▲0.11	0	Steady
Build One South Africa	3,892	0.44	New	0	New
Rise Mzansi	3,189	0.36	New	0	New
African Independent Congress	2,182	0.25	▼0.21	0	Steady
United Democratic Movement	2,132	0.24	▼0.06	0	Steady
Arise South Africa	1,740	0.20	New	0	New
Congress of the People	1,738	0.20	▼0.07	0	Steady
African Congress for Transformation	1,591	0.18	New	0	New
African Transformation Movement	1,396	0.16	▼0.23	0	Steady
Inkatha Freedom Party	1,335	0.15	▲0.07	0	Steady
Pan Africanist Congress of Azania	1,330	0.15	▲0.04	0	Steady
Economic Liberators Forum	1,053	0.12	New	0	New
Al Jama-ah	725	0.08	New	0	New
African People's Convention	707	0.08	▼0.07	0	Steady
Africa Restoration Alliance	510	0.06	New	0	New
Good	500	0.06	▼0.06	0	Steady
Sizwe Ummah Nation	485	0.05	New	0	New
All Citizens Party	413	0.05	New	0	New
African Movement Congress	226	0.03	New	0	New
Total	885,206	100.00	–	38	–
Valid votes	885,206	98.70			
Invalid/blank votes	11,663	1.30			
Total votes	896,869	100.00			
Registered voters/turnout	1,768,576	50.71			
Source: Electoral Commission of South Africa

== Western Cape ==
Results by municipality

Party	Votes	%	+/–	Seats	+/–
Democratic Alliance	1,088,423	55.30	–0.1	24	0
African National Congress	384,853	19.55	–9.1	8	–4
Patriotic Alliance	153,607	7.80	New	3	New
Economic Freedom Fighters	104,354	5.30	+1.3	2	0
National Coloured Congress	46,770	2.38	New	1	New
Freedom Front Plus	28,471	1.45	-0.1	1	0
Al Jama-ah	25,537	1.30	+1.3	1	0
African Christian Democratic Party	25,363	1.29	-1.4	1	0
Good	22,207	1.13	-1.9	1	0
uMkhonto we Sizwe	11,263	0.57	New	0	New
Rise Mzansi	9,954	0.51	New	0	New
Africa Restoration Alliance	8,318	0.42	New	0	New
Build One South Africa	8,028	0.41	New	0	New
Pan Africanist Congress	6,151	0.31	+0.1	0	0
United Democratic Movement	5,933	0.30	0	0	0
ActionSA	5,788	0.29	New	0	New
African Transformation Movement	5,581	0.28	0	0	0
Referendum Party	5,110	0.26	New	0	New
People's Movement for Change	5,074	0.26	New	0	New
Allied Movement for Change	5,065	0.26	New	0	New
Allied of Citizens for Change	2,430	0.12	New	0	New
Land Party	1,865	0.09	0	0	0
Congress of the People	1,774	0.09	0	0	0
Arise South Africa	1,772	0.09	New	0	New
African Independent Congress	1,481	0.08	0	0	0
Sizwe Ummah Nation	998	0.05	New	0	New
Inkatha Freedom Party	824	0.04	0	0	0
Azanian People's Organisation	813	0.04	0	0	0
O.D.	456	0.02	New	0	New
Total	1,968,263	100.00	–	42	–
Valid votes	1,968,263	99.25			
Invalid/blank votes	14,874	0.75			
Total votes	1,983,137	100.00			
Registered voters/turnout	3,317,072	59.79			
Source: Independent Electoral Commission, Daily Maverick and News24
