= 2023 IBSA World Games =

Blind sports event

- Host city: Birmingham
- Country: Great Britain
- Organisers: International Blind Sports Federation, British Blind Sport
- Edition: 7th Games
- Opening: August 14, 2023
- Closing: August 27, 2023
- Opened by: Sallie Barker, MBE (Chair of BBS)
- Website: IBSA Games Birmingham 2023

The 2023 IBSA World Games is a multi-sport event for blind sports.

== History ==
IBSA indicated it would commence searching for a host nation in the latter part of 2018. On 11 May 2020, British Blind Sport and the University of Birmingham, England was announced as the host city, for 18–27 August 2023. The tournament featured the sports of archery, chess, cricket, blind football, goalball, judo, powerlifting, showdown, tenpin bowling and tennis. These games also serve as Paralympic qualifiers for goalball, blind football and judo.

== Sports ==
- Archery (3)
- Chess (2)
- Cricket (2)
- Football (3)
- Goalball (2)
- Judo (18)
- Powerlifting (38)
- Showdown (3)
- Ten-pin bowling (9)
- Tennis (11)

== Events ==
=== Archery ===
Twenty-eight archers from ten countries participated in the archery competition. However, Great Britain took the majority of the medals, medaling in every single event. The VI1 final was between Belgian Reuben Vanhollebeke and Great Britain's Clive Jones with Vanhollebeke taking the gold. The bronze went to Loredana Ruisi of Italy who beat Uganda's Tumisiime Gad Rauben. Four out of the 6 medals in the VI2/3 and VI Open finals went to British archers. Steve Prowse (GB) beat Nick Thomas (GB) to take the gold in the VI2/3 with the bronze going to Belgium's Kathleen Meurrens. In the VI Open, Terry Piper (GB) took gold with silver going to Andrea Thomas (GB). Great Britain's Debora Wright took bronze.

=== Chess ===
Twenty players from seven countries participated in the chess tournament at the 2023 Games. Medals were awarded for the best individual results in the tournament, the best individual results by women, and the best combined results of two-player teams from each country. The individual gold medal was won by Dacian Pribeanu of Romania; Axadxon Kimsanboyev of Uzbekistan took silver, and Zoltán Zámbó of Hungary took bronze. The women's individual gold medal was won by Hanna Vilics of Hungary. The team gold medals went to Zoltán Zámbó and Hanna Vilics of Hungary; Dacian Pribeanu and Ionel Morariu of Romania won the silver medals, and Axadxon Kimsanboyev and Ilhom Gʻulomov of Uzbekistan took bronze.

=== Cricket ===
The 2023 Games was the first to include cricket and featured both a men's and women's competition. England, Australia and India all sent both men's and women's teams to the Games. This tournament marks the debut of the Australian women's team at international level. Despite having an active women's team, Pakistan only sent their men's team due to funding limitations. Bangladesh made up the last of the men's teams competing in the 2023 Games.

India women secured their place in the final, by comfortably winning their first 3 games. Pakistan qualified for the men's final by winning all 4 of their group games. India men made the semi-final by winning three of their 4 games, only losing to Pakistan. Australia took the other place in the women's final with a higher net run rate than England.

In the women's final, Australia batted first and set a score off 114/8 for 20 overs. Rain stopped play which left India with a revised target of 42 runs which they made in 21 balls. This made India undefeated at the Games, having won all 5 matches they played. The men's tournament ended with Bangladesh taking bronze after losing to India in the semi-final. Bangladesh set India a target of 145 runs which they made in 17 overs which took them to the final. The men's final was won by Pakistan who made India's target of 185 in 14.1 overs, making that their 5th undefeated match at the games.

Women's cricket league table (2023 IBSA World Games)
Pos	Team	Pld	W	L	Pts	NRR
1	India (F)	4	4	0	12	8.250
2	Australia (F)	4	1	3	3	−3.234
3	England	4	1	3	3	−4.675

Source: IBSA 2023

Finals
L	Australia	114/8 (20 overs)
W	India	43/1 (3.3 overs) D/L

Men's cricket league table (2023 IBSA World Games)
Pos	Team	Pld	W	L	Pts	NRR
1	Pakistan (F)	4	4	0	12	2.902
2	India (SF)	4	3	1	9	1.835
3	Bangladesh (SF)	4	2	2	6	−0.351
4	England	4	1	3	3	−1.921
5	Australia	4	0	4	0	−2.083

Source: IBSA 2023

Semifinal			Final
			L	India	184/3 (20 overs)
L	Bangladesh	144/6 (20 overs)	W	Pakistan	185/2 (14.1 overs)
W	India	145/3 (17 overs)

=== Football ===
Football at the 2023 IBSA World Games

Partially sighted football
Gold medal – first place	Ukraine	
Silver medal – second place	United Kingdom	
Bronze medal – third place	Spain	

Blind football (women)
Gold medal – first place	Argentina	
Silver medal – second place	Japan	
Bronze medal – third place	Sweden	

Blind football (men)
Gold medal – first place	Argentina	
Silver medal – second place	China	
Bronze medal – third place	Brazil	

Ukraine won the men's partially sighted football against England 4–3 in extra time, their third successive title. Spain beat Japan 9–0 to take third place.

The women's blind football was won by Argentina who beat Japan 2–1 in the final. As well as being the first world championship for women's blind football, the final also had an entirely female referee team. The third place playoff between India and Sweden ended 0–0 but Sweden eventually won on penalties 1–0.

In the men's blind football, Argentina also took the gold after a close game against China. It was 0–0 at full time and went to penalties, ending 2–1 to Argentia. The bronze medal went to Brazil who beat Colombia 7–1.

=== Goalball ===
Fourteen teams competed in the men's goalball competition and twelve in the women's. These were then split into two groups who played each other in a round-robin format. The top four from each group then progressed to the knockout round.

==== Women's competition ====
Brazil, Canada, USA and Germany topped Group A to qualify for the knockouts and China, Japan, Israel and Great Britain topped group B. Brazil, Canada, Japan and China all advanced to the semi-finals. Japan beat Brazil 4 to 3 to take one place in the final with the other going to China who beat Canada 6–1. Brazil beat Canada 2 to 0 to take the bronze medal and Japan lost to China 3 to 0 to take the silver medal. China's gold medal means they have now qualified for the 2024 Paralympic Games.

Quarterfinals
Brazil	3
Great Britain	2
Japan	4
United States	3
China	10
Germany	0
Canada	6
Israel	3

Semifinals
Brazil	3
Japan	4
China	6
Canada	1

Finals
Japan	0
China	3
Bronze match
Brazil	2
Canada	0

==== Men's competition ====
Group X was topped by Lithuania, Japan, South Korea and Finland. The top four positions in Group Y were taken by Ukraine, Iran, USA and Turkey. The four teams to advance to the semi-finals were Lithuania, South Korea, Ukraine and Japan. The first place in the final was taken by South Korea who beat Lithuania 11 to 7 and the other place went to Japan after their 3–4 victory over Ukraine. The bronze medal went to Ukraine after beating Lithuania 9 to 2 and the silver went to South Korea who lost to Japan 3 to 7. Japan's gold medal means they have now qualified for the 2024 Paralympic Games.

Quarterfinals
Lithuania	10
Turkey	2
Iran	1
South Korea	8
Ukraine	11
Finland	4
Japan	5
United States	1

Semifinals
Lithuania	7
South Korea	11
Ukraine	3
Japan	4

Finals
South Korea	3
Japan	7
Bronze match
Lithuania	2
Ukraine	9

=== Judo ===
A total of 18 gold medals were available at the 2023 game, with 236 athletes from 42 countries competing. The World Games also serves as qualification for the 2024 Paris Paralympic Games. Both team gold medals went to Kazakhstan and both silver team medals went to Uzbekistan.

Judo at the 2023 IBSA World Games individual medals table
Rank	NOC	Gold	Silver	Bronze	Total
1	Iran (IRI)	3	0	1	4
2	China (CHN)	2	1	1	4
2	Ukraine (UKR)	2	1	1	4
4	Turkey (TUR)	1	4	1	6
5	Brazil (BRA)	1	2	4	7
6	Kazakhstan (KAZ)	1	2	2	5
7	Uzbekistan (UZB)	1	2	1	4
8	France (FRA)	1	0	2	3
9	Italy (ITA)	1	0	1	2
10	Portugal (POR)	1	0	0	1
10	Romania (ROU)	1	0	0	1
12	Azerbaijan (AZE)	0	2	1	3
13	Georgia (GEO)	0	1	2	3
14	Argentina (ARG)	0	0	2	2
14	Japan (JPN)	0	0	2	2
14	Moldova (MDA)	0	0	2	2
17	Algeria (ALG)	0	0	1	1
17	Cuba (CUB)	0	0	1	1
17	Germany (GER)	0	0	1	1
17	India (IND)	0	0	1	1
17	Kyrgyzstan (KGZ)	0	0	1	1
17	United States (USA)	0	0	1	1
Totals (22 entries)		15	15	29	59

=== Powerlifting ===
The 2023 Games saw world records broken in the squats. Egyption Ahmed Hemid squatted 213 kg in the 75 kg weight class and Ukrainian Andril Myronets squatted 223 kg in the 82.5 kg class to set new world records.

Powerlifing at the 2023 IBSA World Games individual medals table
Rank	NOC	Gold	Silver	Bronze	Total
1	Ukraine (UKR)	27	9	1	37
2	Iran (IRI)	3	6	3	12
3	Egypt (EGY)	2	8	0	10
4	Georgia (GEO)	2	1	4	7
5	Turkey (TUR)	1	5	3	9
6	Czech Republic (CZE)	1	1	0	2
7	Japan (JPN)	0	1	1	2
8	Kazakhstan (KAZ)	0	0	3	3
9	Australia (AUS)	0	0	1	1
Totals (9 entries)		36	31	16	83

=== Ten pin bowling ===
Polish bowlers dominated the individual categories at the 2023 games, winning the B1 and B2 women's finals and the B1 and B2 men's finals. Karolina Rzepa won the B1 women's final with a total score of 1,055 and Jadwiga Rogacka won the B2 final with a score of 1329. Zdzisław Koziej of Poland won the B1 men's finals with a total score of 1,090. Mieczysław Kontrymowicz won the B2 men's final with a score of 1,561. Both of the B3 finals were won by Korean bowlers, with Lee Kun Hye winning the women's final with a score of 1584 and Bae Jinhyung winning the men's final with a score off 1555. In the doubles, Poland continued to dominate, taking gold and silver in the mixed doubles and silver in both the women's and men's doubles.

=== Showdown ===
The showdown tournament at the 2023 Games consisted of men's, women's and team competitions. The men's final was won by Deniss Ovsjaņņikovs of Latvia who beat Poland's Krystian Kisiel 3 sets to 1. The bronze was taken by Adrian Sloninka of Poland after beating Belgium's Christoff Eilers 3 sets to 2. The women's final saw Elzbieta Mielczarek of Poland play Finland's Hanna Vilmi with Mielczarek winning 3 sets to nil. The bronze medal match saw two Italians face off. Graziana Mauro won 3 sets to nil against Sonia Tranchina to secure the medal. The team event continued Poland's domination who beat Italy in the final. Finland beat Latvia to take the bronze medal.

=== Tennis ===
A total of 11 gold medals in blind and low vision tennis were available at the Games across genders and classifications. There were single competitions for men and women in B1, B2, B3 and B4/5, as well as B2/4 men's and women's doubles. Additionally, there was a B1 mixed doubles.

Australian players dominated to the Games, taking 5 of the 11 available gold medals and another two bronze and silver medals. Among these was Arato Katsuda-Green, who took silver in the B2/4 men's doubles and bronze in the B4/5 men's singles and turned 12 over the course of the Games.

British tennis players took 11 medals in total, including 2 golds.

* Host nation (Great Britain)

Tennis at the 2023 IBSA World Games medals table
Rank	NOC	Gold	Silver	Bronze	Total
1	Australia (AUS)	5	2	2	9
2	Great Britain (GBR)*	2	5	4	11
3	Italy (ITA)	2	1	0	3
4	Pakistan (PAK)	2	0	0	2
5	Germany (GER)	1	0	2	3
6	Spain (ESP)	0	2	1	3
7	Colombia (COL)	0	1	0	1
7	Lithuania (LTU)	0	1	0	1
7	Luxembourg (LUX)	0	1	0	1
10	India (IND)	0	0	1	1
10	Poland (POL)	0	0	1	1
10	United States (USA)	0	0	1	1
Totals (12 entries)		12	13	12	37
