= Tennis (disambiguation) =

Tennis is a racquet sport played on a ground court.

Tennis may also refer to:

== Sports ==
- Blind and low vision tennis, tennis adapted for persons with a vision impairment
- Real tennis, a precursor to modern (lawn) tennis
- Soft tennis, a type of tennis using a soft ball
- Table tennis, also known as ping-pong
- Wheelchair tennis, tennis adapted for wheelchair users

== Places ==
- Tennis, Egypt, a medieval city
- Tennis, Kansas, United States, an unincorporated community

== Games ==
- Tennis (1981 video game), an Activision game
- Tennis (1984 video game), a Nintendo game
- Tennis (paper game)

== Music ==
- Tennis (album), by Chris Rea
- Tennis (band), a husband/wife group consisting of Patrick Riley and Alaina Moore
- "Tennis", by Lily Allen from West End Girl

== People ==
=== Surname ===
- Cabell Tennis (1932–2026), American Episcopalian Bishop of Delaware
- Cary Tennis (born 1953), American author and advice columnist for Salon.com
- Gary Tennis, American drug and alcohol policy expert

=== Given name ===
- Tennis Krishna, Indian actor
- Tennys Sandgren (born 1991), American tennis player

== Other uses ==
- Tennis (magazine)

== See also ==
- Tonnis
