= Tony (given name) =

- Gender: Unisex (mostly male)

Origin
- Origin: Latin

Other names
- Alternative spelling: Toney, Toni, Tonie, Tonny, Tonnie
- Related names: Anthony, Antonio, Tonie, Antonia, Antonietta, Antoinette, Antonella

Tony is an English masculine given name that occurs as a diminutive form of Anthony or Antonio in many countries. As a diminutive form of Antonia or Antonietta, it is found in Denmark, Finland, Greenland, Norway, and Sweden. It has been among the top 600 most popular male baby names in the United States since the late 19th century and was among the top 200 from the beginning of the 20th century to the 1990s.

== Notable people ==
- Tony Abbott (born 1957), Australian politician
- Tony Acquaviva (1925–1986), American composer and conductor
- Tony Adams (disambiguation), multiple people
- Tony Aiseia, Marshallese politician
- Tony An (born 1978), South Korean singer, member of boy band H.O.T.
- Tony Anselmo (born 1960), American actor
- Tony Apollon, Mauritian politician
- Tony Archer (disambiguation), multiple people
- Tony Armas (born 1953), Venezuelan baseball player
- Tony Armas Jr. (born 1978), Venezuelan baseball player, son of Tony Armas
- Tony Arnerich (born 1979), American baseball player
- Tony Atlas (born 1954), American wrestler
- Tony Benn (1925–2014), British politician
- Tony Bennett (1926–2023), American singer
- Tony Binarelli (1940–2022), Italian magician
- Tony Bishop (born 1989), Panamanian basketball player
- Tony Blackburn (born 1943), British disc jockey
- Tony Blair (born 1953), British politician
- Tony Blanco (1980–2025), Dominican baseball player
- Tony Blinken (born 1962), American government administrator and secretary of state
- Tony Bonalair (born 2001), French politician
- Tony Brooks-James (born 1994), American football player
- Tony Brown (disambiguation), multiple people
- Tony Burke (born 1969), Australian politician
- Tony Canadeo (1919–2003), American football player
- Tony Compagno (1921–1971), American football player
- Tony Cook (disambiguation), multiple people
- Tony Corbin (born 1974), American football player
- Tony Costa (1944–1974), American serial killer
- Tony Cristiani, American football player
- Tony Cruz (jockey) (born 1956), horse trainer and former Champion Thoroughbred horse racing jockey
- Tony Cuesta, Cuban exile
- Tony Curtis (1925–2010), American actor
- Tony Danza (born 1951), American actor
- Tony Diaz (born 1977), Dominican baseball coach
- Tony Diaz (American football) (born 2006), American football player
- Tony Discenzo (1936–2007), American football player
- Tony Douglas (singer) (1929–2013), American country music singer
- Tony Drago (born 1965), Maltese snooker player
- Tony Esnault, French chef
- Tony Evers (born 1951), American politician
- Tony Ferguson (Born 1984), American Mixed Martial Artist
- Tony Fernandes (born 1964), Malaysian entrepreneur
- Tony Fields (1958–1995), American dancer
- Tony Fields II (born 1999), American football player
- Tony Gaffney (born 1984), American basketball player
- Tony Ganios (1959–2024), American actor
- Tony Gara (1939–2006), Zimbabwean politician
- Tony Gonsolin (born 1994), American baseball player
- Tony Grosser, South Australian criminal who repeatedly shot at police in 1994
- Tony Gustavsson (born 1973), Swedish football manager
- Tony Gwynn (1960–2014), American baseball player
- Tony Hale (born 1970), American actor and comedian
- Tony Hargain (born 1967), American football player
- Tony Hart (1925–2009), English TV presenter
- Tony Hawk (born 1968), American skateboarder
- Tony Haynes (American musician) (born 1960), American lyricist, songwriter, author
- Tony Haynes (English composer) (born 1941), British composer, musician and bandleader
- Anthony "Tony" Holten, Irish writer
- Tony Hungle (1926-1997), Canadian football player
- Tony Imba (born 1979), Malaysian murderer
- Tony Iommi (born 1948), English guitarist for Black Sabbath
- Tony Ippolito (1917–1951), American football player
- Tony Jayawardena (born 1978), Sri Lankan British actor
- Tony Jeffery (born 1964), American football player
- Tony Johns (born 1960), Canadian football player
- Tony Jones (disambiguation), multiple people
- Tony Judt (1948–2010), British historian
- Tony Kaska (1911–1994), American football player
- Tony Kemp (baseball) (born 1991), American baseball player
- Tony Kia (1966–2009), Singaporean triad leader and murderer
- Tony La Russa (born 1944), American baseball manager
- Tony Labrusca (born 1995), Filipino-American actor
- Tony Leung Ka-Fai (born 1958), Hong Kong actor
- Tony Leung Chiu-Wai (born 1962), Hong Kong actor
- Tony Levine (born 1972), American football coach
- Tony Liberatore (born 1966), Australian footballer
- Tony Lockett (born 1966), Australian footballer
- Tony Mansolino, American baseball coach
- Tony Martin (American singer) (1913–2012), American actor and singer
- Tony Mills (musician) (1962–2019), English musician, member of the bands Shy and TNT
- Anthony Nwakaeme (born 1989), Nigerian footballer
- Tony Olmos, Mexican-American filmmaker
- Tony Parker (born 1982), French basketball player
- Tony Parker (author) (1923–1996), British oral historian
- Tony Parker (basketball, born 1993), American basketball player
- Tony Perezchica (born 1966), American baseball player and coach
- Antoinette Perry (1888–1946), American actress and director after whom the Tony Awards are named
- Tony Piccolo (born 1960), Australian politician
- Tony da Costa Pinho (born 1983), Brazilian footballer
- Tony Plush (Nyjer Morgan, born 1980), American baseball player
- Tony Poljan (born 1998), American football player
- Tony Pollard (born 1997), American footballer
- Tony Pollard (archaeologist) (born 1965), British archaeologist
- Tony Popovic (born 1973), Australian football manager
- Tony Ramos (born 1948), Brazilian actor
- Tony Ramos (wrestler) (born 1991), American wrestler
- Tony Randall (1920–2004), American actor
- Tony Robbins (born 1960), American author and motivational speaker
- Tony Rojas (born 2005), American football player
- Tony Romo (born 1980), American football player
- Tony Ronaldson (born 1972), Australian basketball player
- Tony Roper (racing driver) American NASCAR driver
- Anthony da Silva (born 1980), Portuguese footballer
- Tony Samuels, American football player
- Tony Santillan, American baseball player
- Tony Satini (born 1993), Australian rugby player
- Tony Scarborough (born 1946), justice of the New Mexico Supreme Court
- Tony Sirico (1942–2022), American actor
- Tony Slattery, English comedian and actor
- Tony Smurfit, British-born Irish businessman
- Tony Stewart, American NASCAR Driver
- Tony Swatton, Anglo-American blacksmith
- Tony Sylva (born 1975), Senegalese goalkeeper
- Tony Taka, Japanese illustrator, video game artist and character designer
- Tony Tan Caktiong (born 1953), Chinese-Filipino billionaire and business magnate
- Tony Tan (born 1940), President of Singapore 2011–17
- Tony Tchani (born 1989), Cameroonian footballer
- Tony Thurman (born 1962), American football player
- Tony Todd (1954–2024), American actor
- Tony Topham (1929–2004), British academic and writer
- Tony Tornado (born 1930), Brazilian actor and singer
- Tony Joe White (1943–2018), American singer-songwriter
- Tony Vlachos (born 1973), American police officer and reality television personality
- Tony Waiters (1937–2020), English footballer and manager
- Tony Wied (born 1976), American politician
- Tony Williams (rugby league) (born 1988), Australian rugby player
- Tony Wolf (1930–2018), Italian illustrator and writer
- Tony Wolters (born 1992), American baseball player
- Tony Younger (born 1980), American-Israeli basketball player

== Fictional characters ==
- Fast Tony, in the 2006 animated film Ice Age: The Meltdown
- Fat Tony (The Simpsons), two Mafia bosses in the animated TV program The Simpsons
- Anthony Mark "Tony" Banta, in American sitcom television series Taxi
- Tony Blundetto, a character from The Sopranos, played by Steve Buscemi
- Tony DiMera, in the soap opera Days of Our Lives
- Tony Gordillo, in the Nickelodeon Latin American series, Grachi
- Tony, a blue bird and Terence's cousin from Angry Birds Seasons
- Tony Wah Chong Leonetti, in the American TV miniseries V (1983 miniseries) and V The Final Battle
- Tony Micelli, in American sitcom television series Who's the Boss
- Tony Montana, in the 1983 film Scarface
- Tony Myers, a character from the Nickelodeon series, Every Witch Way
- Tony Nelson, one of the main characters of the TV series I Dream of Jeannie, played by Larry Hagman
- Tony Padilla, in the novel and Netflix series 13 Reasons Why
- Tony Petrocelli, defense lawyer in the American TV series Petrocelli
- Tony Prince, main protagonist of Grand Theft Auto: The Ballad of Gay Tony
- Tony Soprano, main protagonist in The Sopranos TV series
- Tony Stark, also known as Iron Man, in Marvel comics
  - Tony Stark (Marvel Cinematic Universe)
- Tony Stonem, in British TV series Skins
- Tony the Tiger, cartoon mascot for Kellogg's Frosted Flakes breakfast cereal
- Tony, an anthropomorphic clock from Don't Hug Me I'm Scared
- Tony Toponi, Fievel's best friend from An American Tail
- Tony, in the 1957 musical West Side Story
- Tony, Jeff's roommate from the 1995 SNES game EarthBound

== See also ==
- Thony (name)
- Tona (name)
- Toni, name
- Toney (name)
- Tonny (name)
- Tonye
- Tony! Toni! Toné!
