= Toney (name) =

Toney is a given name and a nickname. Notable people with this name include the following:

== Given name ==
=== First name ===
- Toney Anaya (born 1941), American politician
- Toney Clemons (born 1988), American gridiron football
- Toney Douglas (born 1986), American basketball player
- Toney Freeman (born 1966), American bodybuilder
- Toney Lee (fl. 1982–1988) American singer, songwriter and music producer
- Toney Mack (born 1967), American basketball player
- Toney Penna (1908–1995), Italian golfer

=== Middle name ===
- Cheryll Toney Holley, native American chief
- Peter Paul Toney Babey, Canadian indigenous leader

=== Nickname ===
- Kemp Toney, nickname of Hardin Kimbrough Toney (1876–1955), American politician
- Toney Rocks, stagename of Toney Robinson (fl. 2017), American musician

== Surname ==
- Albert Toney (1879–1931), American baseball player
- Andrew Toney (born 1957), American basketball player
- Anthony Toney (born 1962), American football player
- Au'Diese Toney (born 1999), American basketball player
- Cliff Toney (born 1958), American football player
- Darren Toney (born 1984), American gridiron football player
- Fred Toney (1888–1953), American baseball player
- Ivan Toney (born 1996), English footballer
- James Toney (born 1968), American boxer
- Jillian Toney (born 1970), English karateka
- Julliet Toney (born 1970), English karateka
- Kadarius Toney (born 1999), American football player
- Kevin Toney, American pianist and composer
- Marcus B. Toney (1840–1929), American Confederate veteran
- Michael Roy Toney (1965–2009), American citizen
- Oscar Toney, Jr. (born 1939), American soul singer
- Renné Toney, Brazilian female bodybuilder
- Sedric Toney (born 1962), American basketball player
- Shaka Toney (born 1998), American football player
- Tyler Toney (born 1989), member of American trick shot conglomerate Dude Perfect

== See also ==
- Toney (disambiguation)
- Tone (name)
- Toner (surname)
- Tonny (name)
- Tony (name)
- Tonye
- Torey (name)
