= Renne =

Renne may refer to:

== People ==
- Renne Hughes, an artist from Texas
- Renné Toney, a female bodybuilder
- Louise Renne, a lawyer in California
- Paul Renne, a professor at the University of California, Berkeley
- Roland Renne (1905–1989), former president of Montana State University-Bozeman

== Toponyms ==
- Steinerne Renne, a waterfall in Germany
- Rivière le Renne (English: Reindeer River), a tributary of the Yamaska River in the Acton Regional County Municipality, Quebec, Canada
