= Tonny (disambiguation) =

Tonny is a 1962 Norwegian drama film.

Tonny may also refer to:

== Places ==
- Tonny, Belgium, a village in the province of Luxembourg, Belgium

== Name ==
- Tonny (name)

== See also ==
- Tinny (disambiguation)
- Toney (disambiguation)
- Tonn (disambiguation)
- Tonna (disambiguation)
- Tonne (disambiguation)
- Tony (disambiguation)
- Tunny (disambiguation)
- Torny Pedersen
