= Tany =

Tany may refer to:

- Tany Youne (1903-1977), Soviet actress and writer
- Luke de Tany (died 1282), high-ranking Norman lord
- Theaurau John Tany (c. 1608 - 1659), English preacher and religious visionary
- William Tany (died after 1385), a prior of the Hospitallers in Ireland
- Tany, the sister of Nehesy, a king in the late Hyksos period c. 1570 BCE
- the Hungarian name of Tôň, a village and municipality in Slovakia

== See also ==
- Taney (disambiguation)
