= Tonne (disambiguation) =

Tonne is a metric unit of mass.

Tonne, Tønne, Tønnes, Tönnes or Tonnes may also refer to:

== Places ==
- Tonnes, Norway, a village in Lurøy, Nordland county, Norway
- Sainte-Croix-Grand-Tonne, a former commune in northwestern France

== Other ==
- Tonne (name), Norwegian name
- Tonnes (name), Danish/Norwegian name
- Tønne (unit), an obsolete Norwegian unit of volume
- Herr Tønne af Alsø, a Danish ballad

== See also ==
- Ton (disambiguation)
- Tonn (disambiguation)
- Tonny (disambiguation)
