= Tony =

Tony may refer to:

== People and fictional characters ==
- Tony the Tiger, cartoon mascot for Frosted Flakes cereal
- Tony (given name), including a list of people and fictional characters
- Gregory Tony (born 1978), American law enforcement officer
- Motu Tony (born 1981), New Zealand international rugby league footballer
- Tony (footballer, born 1983), full name Tony Heleno da Costa Pinho, Brazilian football defensive midfielder
- Tony (footballer, born 1986), full name Antônio de Moura Carvalho, Brazilian football attacking midfielder
- Tony (footballer, born 1989), full name Tony Ewerton Ramos da Silva, Brazilian football right-back

== Film, theater and television ==
- Tony Awards, a Broadway theatre honor
- Tony (1982 film), an Indian Kannada-language film
- Tony (2009 film), a British horror film directed by Gerard Johnson
- Tony (2013 film), an Indian Kannada-language thriller film
- Tony (2026 film), an American biopic about Anthony Bourdain
- "Tony" (Skins series 1), the first episode of British comedy-drama Skins
- "Tony" (Skins series 2), episode six of the second series of Skins

== Music ==
- Tony T., stage name of British singer, rapper and DJ Neal Antone Dyer (born 1971)
- Tony (album), a 1957 album by Tony Bennett
- "T.O.N.Y. (Top of New York)", a 1997 single by Capone-N-Noreaga
- "T.O.N.Y.", a 2008 song by Solange Knowles

== Other uses ==
- Kawasaki Ki-61, a Japanese World War II fighter aircraft code-named "Tony"
- Tony, Wisconsin, a village in the United States
- List of storms named Tony, tropical cyclones named Tony

== See also ==
- Toni (disambiguation)
- Tonie, Kraków, a neighborhood of the city of Kraków, Poland
- Toney (disambiguation)
- Tonny (disambiguation)
- Torny Pedersen
