= Torball =

Sport for persons with a vision impairment

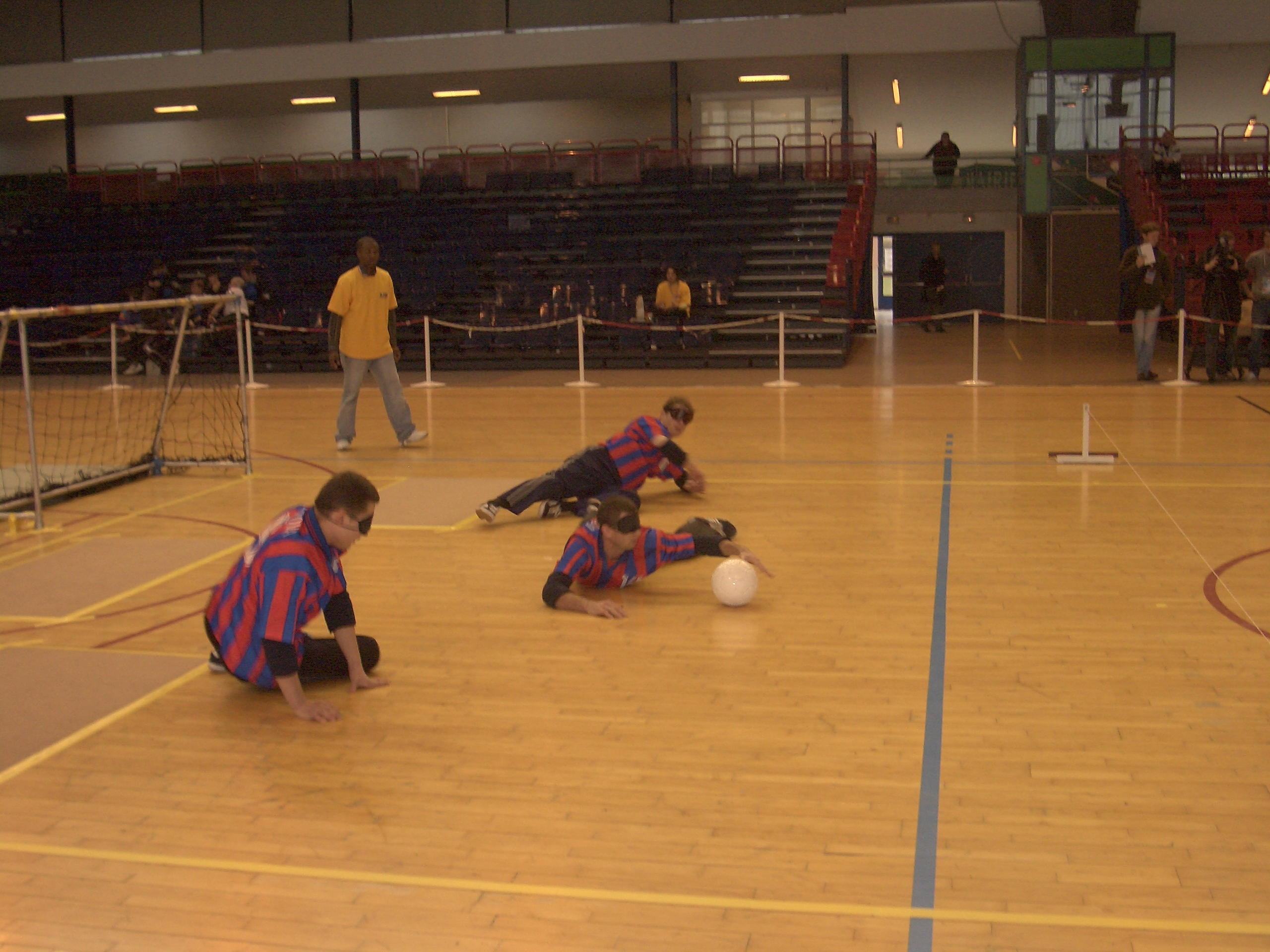
M.E.A.N. team at the European Torball Cup, Paris (2007), showing stringed line across the court

Torball (German: goal ball) is a team sport for the blind and vision-impaired and was developed in the 1970s in the Central Europe. With some similar structures, it is different to the Paralympic Games team sport of goalball. The sport is recognised by the International Blind Sports Federation.

== Description ==
Torball is played by two teams on opposite sides of an indoor playing field. Each team consists of three players. In the middle part of the field, there are three cords stretched across the entire width. On each end of the playing field is a goal that also stretches the entire width (7 m (23 ft)) of the field. The playing ball is similar to a soccer ball with bells inside so that it can be heard when it is rolling across the playing field.

The object of the game is to score as many goals as possible by rolling the ball under the three cords into the goal of the opposing team. The three-player teams are both attackers and defenders during the two five-minute periods. If the ball touches one of the three cords, a penalty is called, where one player leaves the field and the remaining two players must try to defend their goal for one 'throw' by the opposing team.

== Events ==
Competitions are held at various levels, from the world championships, world cups, European cups, and other tournaments.

=== World Torball Championship ===
- 1990 – Saint Etienne, France
- 2001 – Switzerland – World and European Championship
- 2004 – Argentina
- 2007 – Innsbruck, Austria (first: German men, Italian women)
- 2015 – Magglingen, Switzerland (first: Swiss men, German women)

=== European Torball Championship ===
- 1983 – Paris, France
- 1985 – Rome, Italy
- 1989 – Switzerland
- 1991 – Italy
- 1993 – Switzerland
- 1995 – Belgium
- 1999 – France
- 2001 – Switzerland – World and European Championship

==== European Junior Torball Championship ====
- 1995 – Switzerland
- 1996 – France
- 1997 – Belgium

=== European and World Torball Cup ===
- 1986 – Germany
- 1987 – Italy
- 1988 – Austria
- 1991 – Switzerland
- 1992 – Belgium
- 1993 – Germany
- 1994 – Italy
- 1995 – Italy
- 1996 – Germany
- 1997 – Belgium
- 1998 – Switzerland – World and European Cup
- 1999 – Austria
- 2000 – Germany – World and European Cup
- 2001 – France
- 2002 – Belgium – World and European Cup
- 2003 – Germany – 13th European Cup
- 2004 – Austria – 4th World and 14th European Cups
- 2005 – Austria – 15th European Cup
- 2006 – Germany – 5th World and 16th European Cups
- 2007 – France – 17th European Cup
- 2008 – France – 6th World and 18th European Cups
- 2009 – Switzerland – 19th European Cup
- 2010 – Italy – 7th IBSA World and 20th IBSA European Torball Cup
- 2011 – Italy – 21st IBSA European Torball Cup
- 2012 – Germany – 8th IBSA World and 22nd IBSA European Torball Cup
- 2013 – Belgium – 23rd IBSA European Torball Cup

25th IBSA European Torball Cup in Poland in 2015.

== Rules ==
The official rules for torball were previously determined by the International Blind Sports Federation.

== Differences with goalball ==
Torball is conducted in Europe, whereas goalball is played globally with world championships and is a Paralympic Games event after being demonstrated in 1972.

Both are indoor sports, three team players at one end of a court, and played with a belled ball. The goal post is the entire width of the court and has the same 1.3 metres (4 ft 3 in) inner goal height. Both athletes wear a blindfold, regardless of their degree of vision. Each team can have six players.

Differences include:

- Court size: Goalball uses a volleyball court, 18 metres (59 ft) long, 9 metres (30 ft) wide; Torball is 16 metres (52 ft) long, 7 metres (23 ft) wide;
- Court surface: Goalball lines are tactile tape markings; Torball has rectangular carpet 'orientation mats' (2 x 1 m) for the players;
- Ball: Goalball balls are about basketball size and 1.25 kilograms (2.8 lb); Torball balls are about volleyball size, and a light 0.5 kilograms (1.1 lb);
- Game time: Goalball in 1978 had seven-minute halves, and by 2014 twelve-minute halves; Torball has five-minute halves;
- Ball movement: Goalball balls are usually rolled or bounced along the court; Torball has three strings stretched across the court with a 0.4 metres (1 ft 3.7 in) inner clearance, so the ball has to be thrown low along the ground;
- Officials: Goalball has two on-court referees; Torball has one referee.
