= International Blind Sports Federation =

International federation of sports for athletes with a vision impairment

- Formation: 1981; 45 years ago
- Type: Sports federation
- Headquarters: Bonn, Germany
- President: Ilgar Rahimov
- Website: www.ibsasport.org

The International Blind Sports Federation (IBSA) is a non-profit organisation founded 1981 in Paris, France. It was formerly known as the International Blind Sports Association. IBSA's mission is to promote the full integration of blind and partially-sighted people in society through sport and to encourage people with a visual impairment to take up and practise sports. IBSA is a full and founding member of the International Paralympic Committee (IPC).

In March 2022, in light of the 2022 Russian invasion of Ukraine, it banned Russian and Belarusian athletes and officials from its events.

== History ==
The International Blind Sports Association, known by the acronym 'IBSA', was formed in 1981.

The inaugural IBSA president was Paralympic runner and skier Jens Bromann (from Denmark) who served eight years, before becoming involved with the International Paralympic Committee from 1988 to 1992. IBSA was one of four organisations, later six, which formed the 'International Co-coordinating Committee Sports for the Disabled in the World' (ICC) in 1982, which on 22 September 1989 became the International Paralympic Committee, as the global governing body of the Paralympic movement.

Second president (1993 to 2001) was Enrique Sanz (from Spain), followed by Enrique Perrez (2001 to 2005; also from Spain). Fourth president Michael Barredo (from Philippines) served two terms, from 2005 to 2013. Jannie Hammershøi (from Denmark), a former Paralympic goalball athlete, commenced in September 2013 to serve three terms.

The association changed its name to federation between 2002 and 2003, when based in Spain and used the web address www.ibsa.es. The federation was later relocated and registered to Bonn, Germany. Its logo also changed at sometime from a representation of a globe, to its initials with the federation name below; in both logos, the acronym of IBSA being represented in Braille dots.

Sixth president Sandro Di Girolamo (from Italy), the president of the Italian blind sports association, commenced a four-year term from Monday 11 October 2021. The term was cut short with an extraordinary general assembly for 30 June 2023, whereupon Ilgar Rahimov (from Azerbaijan) commenced his four-year term.

In December 2025, the federation did the first-known release of a budget, and strategic plan.

== Sports ==
IBSA is the international federation for several sports for people with a visual impairment, including three Paralympic sports (blind football, goalball, and Para judo), chess, powerlifting, ten-pin bowling, nine-pin bowling, torball, and showdown.

In August 2026, blind and low vision tennis was added to IBSA sports.

Competition is held within five regions: Africa, America, Asia, Europe, and Oceania. For the sport of goalball, competitively Asia and Oceania are drawn together as 'Asia-Pacific' region.

== Sporting events ==
IBSA's showcase event is the IBSA World Championships and Games, held every four years. The first games took place in 1998 in Madrid, Spain, followed by the event in 2003 at Quebec City, Canada. The third edition of the games was held in São Paulo, Brazil, in 2007, and the 2011 games took place in Antalya, Turkey.

In 2015, between 8 and 18 May, the 5th IBSA World Championships and Games was held in Seoul, South Korea, and included competitions in powerlifting, judo, goalball, football, chess, tenpin bowling, tandem cycling, swimming, showdown, and athletics.

IBSA also organises world and regional championships in many of its sports. Regional or continental championships are generally held in odd years, while world championships take place every four years in even years when there are no Paralympic Games.

== Events ==
=== IBSA World Games ===
Edition	Year	Host	Date	Sports
1	1998	Spain, Madrid	18–26 July	4
2	2003	Canada, Quebec	5–10 August	4
3	2007	Brazil, São Paulo	28 July – 8 August	6
4	2011	Turkey, Antalya	1–10 April	7
5	2015	South Korea, Seoul	8–18 May	10
6	2019	Not held	—	
7	2023	United Kingdom, Birmingham	18–27 August	11
8	2027	Uzbekistan, Tashkent		

=== IBSA World Youth Games (WYC) ===
- Former name: IBSA World Youth and Student Games

Edition	Year	Host	Dates	Sports
1	2005	USA, Colorado Springs	4–10 August	5
2	2007	USA, Colorado Springs	11–17 July	5
3	2009	USA, Colorado Springs	15–20 July	3
4	2011	USA, Colorado Springs	13–18 July	3
5	2013	USA, Colorado Springs	13–15 September	2
6	2015	USA, Colorado Springs	26–30 July	1
7	2017	HUN, Budaörs	1–9 July	1

== See also ==
- International Paralympic Committee
- Paralympic Games
- Ski for Light
