= Toney =

Toney may refer to:

== People ==
- Toney (name)

== Places ==
- Saham Toney, Norfolk, England
- Toney, Alabama, United States
- Toney, West Virginia, United States
- Toney, County Fermanagh, townland in County Fermanagh, Northern Ireland
- Toney Fork, West Virginia, United States
- Toney Stratford, former name of Stratford Tony village and parish, Wiltshire, England
- Toney Mountain, Antarctica
- Toney River, Nova Scotia, Canada

== See also ==
- Black Toney, a Thoroughbred horse
- Toney-Standley House
- Taney (disambiguation)
- Tony (disambiguation)
- Tone (disambiguation)
- Toner (surname)
- Tonny (disambiguation)
- Tovey (disambiguation)
