= Tonnie =

Tonnie is a Danish, Dutch, Portuguese and Swedish given name and diminutive nickname with both masculine and feminine uses. As a Danish and Swedish name it is used as a diminutive of Antonia in Greenland, Denmark and Sweden, but also has masculine uses. As a Dutch name it has feminine used as a diminutive of Antonia in Belgium, Indonesia, Suriname, South Africa, Namibia, and the Netherlands. As both a Dutch and Portuguese name it has masculine use as diminutives of Antônio, António, Antonius, Anton, Antoon, Anthonis, and Anthoon in Brazil, Portugal, Angola, Mozambique, Belgium, Indonesia, Suriname, South Africa, Namibia, and the Netherlands. Notable people with the name include the following:

== Given name ==
- Tonnie Cusell, whose full name is Tonnie Harry Cusell Lilipaly (born 1983), Dutch-born naturalized Indonesian footballer

== Nickname/stagename ==
- Tonnie Dirks, nickname of Antonius Marinus Hendricus Maria Dirks (born 1961), Dutch long-distance athlete
- Tonnie Hom, nickname of Antonia Johanna Hom (1932 – 2013), Dutch swimmer

== See also ==
- Tonie
- Tonne (name)
- Tonni (name)
- Tönnies
- Tonnis
- Townie (disambiguation)
