= Townie =

Townie may refer to:

== Places ==
- Towney Lock, Berkshire, nicknamed "Townie"

== People ==
- Townie, as in town and gown, a term commonly used in university towns to refer to residents not affiliated with the university

== Arts, entertainment, and media ==
- "The Townie", Gossip Girl episode
- Townie: A Memoir, an autobiography by Andre Dubus III
- Townie (album), the fourth studio album by American rock band X Ambassadors
- Townies, 1996 American situation comedy

== Sports ==
- Townie, the mascot for East Providence High School
- The Townies, the nickname of Eastbourne Town F.C.

== Transportation ==
- Townie, a type of bicycle
  - Townie handlebars of bicycles
- Mitsubishi Towny car

== See also ==
- Tonie
- Tonnie
