= Tonny (name) =

Tonny and Þonny are given names. Tonny is a diminutive Swedish, Danish, Finnish, Dutch, and Norwegian unisex form of the given names Antonia, Antonius, Anton, Antoon, Anthonis, Anthoon as well as a Scandinavian masculine version of the name Toni and pet form of names ending with the element "-ton" that is popular in Finland, Denmark, Sweden, Norway, the Netherlands, Indonesia, South Africa, Namibia, Suriname, Republic of Karelia, Estonia and Greenland. Þonny is a feminine given name that is a form of Torny.

== Given names ==
=== Female ===
- Tonny Ahm (1914-1993), Danish badminton player
- Tonny de Jong (born 1974), Dutch speed skater
- Tonny Holst-Christensen (fl. 1956–1962), Danish badminton player
- Tonny van de Vondervoort (born 1950), Dutch politician
- Tonny Zwollo (born 1942), Dutch architect

=== Male ===
- Tonny Roy Ayomi (born 1991), Indonesian footballer
- Tonny Azevedo (born 1969), Brazilian cyclist
- Tonny Brochmann (born 1989), Danish footballer
- Tonny Brogaard (formerly Tonny Nielsen, born 1984), Danish football goalkeeper
- Tonny Jensen (basketball) (born 1971), Australian basketball player
- Tonny Kristians (AKA Kristians Tonny, 1907–1977), Dutch surrealist painter
- Tonny Mupariwa (born 1991), Zimbabwean cricketer
- Tonny Bruins Slot (1947–2020), Dutch football coach
- Tonny Sorensen (born 1964), Danish entrepreneur and creative director
- Tonny Albert Springer, known as T. A. Springer, (1926 – 2011), Dutch mathematician
- Tonny Temple (born 2000), American soccer player
- Tonny van Ede (1924 – 2011), Dutch football player
- Tonny Vilhena (born 1995), Dutch footballer
- Tonny Wamulwa (born 1989), Zambian long-distance athlete
- Tonny, Character in Pusher (film series)

== Nickname ==
- Tonny Eyk pseudonym of Teun Eikelboom, (born 1940), male Dutch musician and entertainer
- Tonny Kessler, nickname of Hermann Anton Joseph Kessler (1889 – 1960), male Dutch football player
- Tonny Koeswoyo, nickname of Koestono Koeswoyo (1936 – 27 March 1987), male Indonesian rock musician
- Tonny Mols, nickname of Antonio Mols, (born 1969), male Belgian footballer
- Tonny Sanabria, nickname of Arnaldo Antonio Sanabria Ayala (born 1996), male Paraguayan professional footballer
- Tonny van der Linden, nickname of Anthonie van der Linden (1932 – 2017), male Dutch footballer
- Tonny van Lierop, nickname of Antoine Robert Onslow van Lierop (1910 – 1982), male Dutch field hockey player

== Middle name ==
- Kipoi Tonny Nsubuga (born 1978), Ugandan politician

== See also ==
- Tonny (disambiguation)
- Tonni (name)
- Tony (name)
- Toney (name)
