= Tönnies =

Tönnies is a surname. Notable people with the surname include:

- Ferdinand Tönnies (1855–1936), German sociologist
- Gustav Tönnies (1814 – 1886), Swedish carpenter, architect and industrialist
- Johann Friedrich Tönnies (1662 – 1736), German merchant and banker
- Michael Tönnies (1959–2017), German football player
- Rudolf Tönnies (1869 – 1929), Austro-Hungarian and Yugoslav architect and politician
- Thorsten Tönnies (born 1991), German footballer
- Clemens Tönnies (born 1956), German billionaire and main shareholder of Tönnies Holding

== Companies ==
- Tönnies Holding, a German company in the meat industry

== See also ==
- Tonnie
- Heinrich Tønnies
