= Totnes (disambiguation) =

Totnes is a market town in South Devon, England.

Totnes may also refer to:

- Totnes railway station
- Totnes (Riverside) railway station
- Totnes (UK Parliament constituency)
- George Carew, 1st Earl of Totnes (1555–1629), an English nobleman

== See also ==
- Totness (disambiguation)
- Tonnes (name)
