= Tonnes (name) =

Tonnes and Tønnes are Danish diminutive forms of the name Antonius. The former is an alternative form of the name Antoni that is used in Denmark and Greenland, while the latter is also a Norwegian diminutive forms of the name Antonius, like Tonne, that is used as an alternate form of the name Tönius that is used in Denmark, Greenland and Norway. Notable people with this name include the following:

== Given name ==
- Tønnes Andenæs (1923–1975), Norwegian jurist, book publisher and politician
- Tønnes Oksefjell (1901–1976), Norwegian politician
- Tønnes Stang Rolfsen (born 1988), Norwegian luger

== Stage name ==
- Ten Tonnes (born 1996), stage name of Ethan Barnett, British singer-songwriter

== See also ==
- Tönnes Björkman (1888–1959), Swedish sport shooter
- Tonnes, Norway
- Tonne (name)
- Tonnis
- Townes (disambiguation)
- Totnes (disambiguation)
