= Tunny =

Tunny may refer to:

- Tuna
- Tunny cipher

== Ships ==
- Either of the United States submarines which has been called USS Tunny

== Fiction ==
- A character in the musical American Idiot
- The name of a fictional family in the horror film Wicked Little Things

== See also ==
- Tonny (disambiguation)
- Tunney (disambiguation)
