= Tonn =

Tonn may refer to:

== People ==
- Adolf Tonn (1929–2013), Austrian bobsledder
- Jörg-Christian Tonn (born 1958), German neurosurgeon
- Claudia Tonn (born 1981), German heptathlete
- Jessica Tonn (born 1992), U.S. runner
- Heinz Tonn (1921–2003), Australian rules footballer

== Other uses ==
- Tõnn, an Estonian given name, a variant of Tõnu
- Tonn, a fictional character from the Thai horror film Shutter (2004 film)
- RV Tonn (2015 ship), a Tonn-class survey vessel, see List of Irish state vessels
- Tonn-class ship, see List of Irish state vessels

== See also ==
- Ton (disambiguation)
- Tonne (disambiguation)
- Tonny (disambiguation)
