= Blind and low vision tennis =

Tennis for persons with a vision impairment

- Highest governing body: International Blind Sports Federation
- First played: 1984 in Japan

Characteristics
- Mixed-sex: Yes

Presence
- Country or region: Worldwide
- Paralympic: No

Blind and low vision tennis ("BLV tennis"; also blind tennis) is tennis adapted for persons who are blind or with a vision impairment. BLV tennis may also be known as visually impaired tennis (VI tennis), or sound tennis. It may be played as singles or doubles.

== History ==
The sport was created in 1984 in Japan by Miyoshi Takei (c. 1942–2011), (Note: USBTA record his first name of Miyoshui Takei as Mioshui.) and is now played in more than thirty countries.

The International Blind Tennis Association (IBTA) was created in 2014.

In September 2025 the IBTA signed a memorandum of understanding with International Blind Sports Federation (IBSA), and separately in October 2025 with the International Tennis Federation (ITF), with a result that in August 2026 IBSA formed the IBSA Blind Tennis Committee to oversee the global governance of the sport.

It is not presently one of the Paralympic sports.

== Rules ==
Compared to tennis, BLV tennis has several adaptions:

- BLV tennis ball is larger, with bearings within to create a sound – usually black or fluorescent yellow in colour;
- racquets have a shorter handle;
- smaller field of play; and
- more brightly-lit indoor court.

Before serving, the server calls "ready", awaits a reply of "yes", before calling "play" and playing the ball. Normal tennis scoring is used but there may be shorter or timed sets.

Rules are adjusted according to the player's vision:

- B1: Players wear a blindfold, the court is smaller and with tactile lines (which can be touched), and a lower net. The ball may bounce three times before a shot;
- B2: The ball may bounce three times before a shot;
- B3: The ball may bounce two times before a shot; and
- B4 and B5: The ball may bounce once before a shot.

== Competitions ==
BLV tennis was one of the ten sports at International Blind Sports Federation's IBSA World Games, in Birmingham, England, in August 2023, with Australia dominating.

The first world women's BLV tennis tournament was held from 3 to 5 September 2026 in Benidorm, Spain.

=== World championships ===
2026 Vilnius

The IBTA world championships were held from 24 to 29 August 2026 in Vilnius, Lithuania, with over 120 athletes from more than 20 countries, with 320 matches played.

== Regions ==
=== Africa ===
By 2026, IBTA representative countries were: Ethiopia, Kenya, Mauritius, Morocco, Niger, and Uganda.

=== America ===
By 2026, IBTA representative countries were: Argentina, Colombia, Mexico, Paraguay, Peru, Uruguay, USA, and Venezuela.

In the USA, the United States Blind Tennis Association (USBTA) was formed in 2022. The first permanently-lined blind tennis courts were in place by July 2024 in four county parks across Pittsburgh thanks to the work of the USBTA.

=== Asia ===
By 2026, IBTA representative countries were: India, Japan, Pakistan, Singapore, and South Korea.

In Japan, from the inaugural 1990 BLV tennis national championships for its first 21 years, the sport's founder Miyoshi Takei was national champion sixteen times.

=== Europe ===
By 2026, IBTA representative countries were: Finland, France, Germany, Ireland, Italy, Lithuania, Luxembourg, Poland, Spain, Sweden, The Netherlands, Turkey, and United Kingdom.

=== Oceania ===
By 2026, IBTA representative countries were: Australia, and New Zealand.

To increase awareness, BLV tennis was part of exhibition matches at the 2023 Australian Open.

== See also ==
- Showdown, an air hockey/table tennis equivalent sport for persons with a vision impairment
- Wheelchair tennis
