= Totness =

Totness may refer to:

- Totness, Suriname
- Totness, South Australia
- Totness Recreation Park, South Australia

== See also ==
- Totnes (disambiguation)
