= Taney =

Taney may refer to:

- Taney (Vouvry, Switzerland), a hamlet
- Taney Parish, a Church of Ireland community in south Dublin, Ireland
- Taney County, Missouri, United States
- USCGC Taney, a United States Coast Guard cutter
- SS Roger B. Taney, a United States Liberty Ship
- Mary Florence Taney (1856–1936), American clubwoman
- Roger B. Taney (1777–1864), U.S. Attorney General and Chief Justice
- Lac de Taney, Switzerland
- Taney Seamounts, a range of underwater volcanoes

== See ==
- Tany (disambiguation)
- Toney (disambiguation)
