= Gary Tennis =

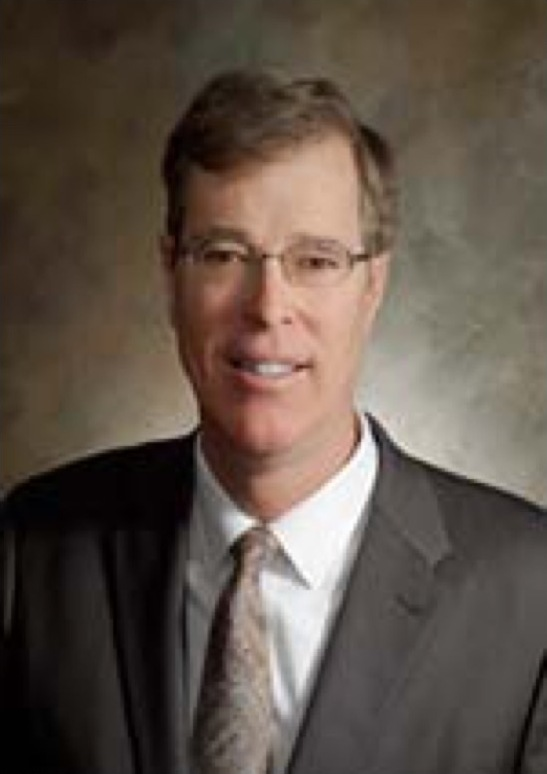

Secretary of Drug and Alcohol Programs of Pennsylvania
- In office May 21, 2012 – January 24, 2017
- Governor: Tom Corbett; Tom Wolf
- Preceded by: Office established
- Succeeded by: Jennifer Smith

Personal details
- Education: University of Tulsa; University of Pennsylvania Law School

Gary Tennis is a drug and alcohol policy expert who served as president and chief executive officer of the National Alliance for Model State Drug Laws from 2017 to 2021. Before that, he served as Pennsylvania's first Secretary of the Pennsylvania Department of Drug and Alcohol Programs from 2012 to 2017. He was appointed by Governor Tom Corbett, re-appointed by Governor Tom Wolf in 2015 and was dismissed by Wolf in 2017.

== Biography ==
Tennis graduated from the University of Pennsylvania Law School in 1980. Prior to that, he taught junior highschool in Pittsburgh from 1975 to 1977. He was a Rhodes Scholar Nominee for the University of Tulsa, where he graduated in 1975.

Tennis worked in the Philadelphia District Attorney's Office from 1980 until 2006. As chief of the Legislation Unit from 1986 to 2006, he served as the legislative liaison for the Pennsylvania District Attorney's Association, working primarily with the Pennsylvania General Assembly. In his position, Tennis emphasized the importance of legislation that strengthened access to and resources for drug and alcohol addiction treatment within and outside of the criminal justice system.

As chair of the District Attorney's Hiring Committee from 1986 to 1993, Tennis founded the Minority Hiring Committee, that worked successfully to recruit African-American, Latino-American and Asian-Pacific American law students and lawyers to become prosecutors.

From 1992 to 1993, Tennis served under Presidents George H. W. Bush and Bill Clinton as Executive Director of the President's Commission on Model State Drug Laws, a bipartisan group of state attorneys general, district attorneys, judges, mayors, police chiefs, treatment and prevention experts, and legislators. After five public hearings across the nation addressing the issues of Economic Remedies, Community Mobilization, Treatment, Drug Free Families, Schools & Workplace, and Crimes Code, the Commission published a five-volume report with forty-four model laws in those areas, enhanced by policy statements and section-by-section commentary for each law.

After completion of the work of the President's Commission, the group formed the National Alliance on Model State Drug Laws (NAMSDL), a congressionally-mandated and funded nonprofit organization. NAMSDL supports states in the adoption of the Model Laws and other effective, cost-beneficial, proven legislation and policies to reduce drug and alcohol abuse. Tennis served on the board from 1993 to 2017, and as chair from 2010 to 2015. In July, 2017 Tennis stepped down from the Board to become NAMSDL's president and chief executive officer.

Tennis also served as treasurer on the Board of the National Association of State Alcohol and Drug Authority Directors from 2014 to 2017, and has, since 2016, served on the Board of the National Association of Drug Court Professionals.

In 2016, Tennis received the Philadelphia Psychiatric Society's Benjamin Rush Award. In 2015, Tennis received the national Ramstad-Kennedy Award, as well as the Pennsylvania Rural Health Leader of the Year. In 2014, he received the NASADAD Award for Exceptional Leadership and Support of Substance Abuse Prevention and Treatment. That year, he also received the Rehabilitation & Community Providers Association Administrative Leadership Award, the first ever government official to receive the award from that group.

In January 2017, the Reading Eagle alleged that Tennis had involved lobbyists in the hiring process at the Department of Drug and Alcohol Programs. He was dismissed shortly thereafter by Governor Tom Wolf. Two days after his termination, Tennis presented reporters with written documentation refuting this report, stating that the Governor's Press Office had prohibited him from supplying the Reading Eagle with the documentation prior to the news story. Tennis repeated for reporters Governor Wolf's explicit statement to him that the reason for the termination was because of his decision to publicly oppose the Governor's plan to downgrade the Department of Drug and Alcohol Programs to a bureau within the Department of Human Services. This plan to downgrade the department, which was unveiled a few weeks later, was ultimately rejected by the Pennsylvania Legislature.
