= Tunney =

Tunney may refer to:

- Tunney, Western Australia

Tunney is also a surname of Irish origin. Notable people with the surname include:

- Frank Tunney (1912–1983), Canadian wrestling executive
- Gene Tunney (1897–1978), American professional boxer; world heavyweight champion 1926–28
- Jack Tunney (1935–2004), Canadian wrestling promoter
- James Tunney (Canadian politician) (1927–2010), Canadian farmer and politician from Ontario; served one term in the Senate of Canada
- James Tunney (Irish politician) (1892–1964), Irish politician; served for seven terms in Seanad Éireann and one term in Dáil Éireann
- Jim Tunney (American football) (1929–2024), American football referee
- Jim Tunney (Irish politician) (1923–2002), Irish politician; TD for Dublin North West 1969–92; Lord Mayor of Dublin 1984–85
- John Tunney (naturalist) (1870–1929), Australian naturalist
- John V. Tunney (1934–2018), American politician from California; U.S. senator 1971–77; son of Gene Tunney
- Paddy Tunney (1921–2002), Irish singer, songwriter, and poet
- Polly Lauder Tunney (1907–2008), American socialite and philanthropist
- Rebecca Tunney (born 1996), British Olympic artistic gymnast
- Robin Tunney (born 1972), American stage, film, and television actress
- Tom Tunney (born 1955), American politician; alderman of the Chicago City Council since 2003

== See also ==
- Tunny (disambiguation)
