= Tonnis =

Tonnis is both a given name and a surname. Notable people with the name include:

- Tonnis van der Heeg (1886–1958), Dutch trade unionist, politician, and resistance activist
- Christiaan Tonnis (born 1956), German painter, draftsman, video artist and author

== See also ==
- Tennis (disambiguation)
- Tonis
- Tonnes (name)
- Tonnie
- Tonni (name)
