= Tony Archer =

Tony Archer may refer to:

- Tony Archer (musician) (1939–2025), English jazz double-bassist
- Tony Archer (referee) (born 1969), rugby league referee
- Tony Archer (Archers), fictional character in The Archers
- fictional NYPD bomb expert in Hawaii Five-0
