= Taney (Vouvry, Switzerland) =

Coordinates: 46.3452708°N 6.8321184°E

Tanay, also spelled "Taney", is a hamlet located in the municipality of Vouvry, in Switzerland.
