= Tony Hungle =

Canadian football player

Profile
- Positions: End, Guard

Personal information
- Born: c. 1926
- Died: May 28, 1997 (aged 71); Edmonton, Alberta
- Listed height: 6 ft 0 in (1.83 m)
- Listed weight: 205 lb (93 kg)

Career history
- 1947–1954: Saskatchewan Roughriders

Anthony John Hungle (c. 1926 – May 27, 1997) was a Canadian football player who played for the Saskatchewan Roughriders. He played junior football in Regina.
