= Pennsylvania Department of Drug and Alcohol Programs =

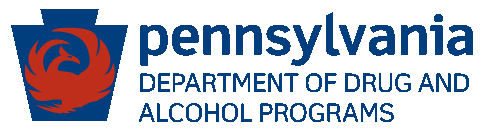

Agency overview
- Formed: July 2012
- Jurisdiction: State government of Pennsylvania
- Headquarters: One Penn Center 2601 North 3rd Street Harrisburg, PA 17110 (717) 783-8200
- Employees: Under 100
- Annual budget: $41.860 million 2014-2015 fiscal year
- Agency executives: Latika Davis-Jones, Secretary of the Department of Drug and Alcohol Programs; Ellen DiDomenico, Deputy Secretary of the Department of Drug and Alcohol Programs
- Website: http://www.ddap.pa.gov/ https://apps.ddap.pa.gov/gethelpnow/

The Pennsylvania Department of Drug and Alcohol Programs is a cabinet-level agency in the Government of Pennsylvania. The objective of this department is to manage and distribute state and federal funds used to oversee alcohol and drug prevention, intervention and treatment services.

“The Department of Drug and Alcohol Programs mission is to engage, coordinate and lead the Commonwealth of Pennsylvania’s effort to prevent and reduce drug, alcohol and gambling addiction and abuse; and to promote recovery, thereby reducing the human and economic impact of the disease.”

== History ==
The Pennsylvania department of drug and alcohol programs formed in July 2012 due to the change in government proposed in Pennsylvania Act 50 in 2010. This department was originally under the department of health but changed to its own organization to focus solely on drug and alcohol-related addictions and problems.

== Services in Pennsylvania ==
The department of drug and alcohol programs has five main functions: - Oversee the implementation and delivery of evidence-based programs, services, guidelines, and policies throughout the commonwealth for communities, families, and treatment facilities, including identified priority populations like veterans, pregnant women, and women with children. - Provide state and federal funds to 47 county drug and alcohol offices, known as Single County Authorities (SCAs), which coordinate access to treatment, case management, and recovery support services at the local level. - Provide treatment funding to individuals who do not have insurance or whose current insurance does not cover the necessary services. - Responsible for licensing freestanding drug and alcohol treatment facilities and contracts with licensed agencies and private practice clinicians to provide outpatient gambling counseling services. - Provide funding for the PA Get Help Now Hotline 1-800-662-HELP to provide individuals with substance use disorder and their families with treatment information and services in their area. DDAP also contracts with the Council on Compulsive Gambling of Pennsylvania, Inc. to manage its toll-free Pennsylvania Gambling Helpline 1-800-GAMBLER

== Heroin Problem in Pennsylvania ==
Within the United States, Pennsylvania snatched third place on the most use of heroin and is the seventh placer to have the most deaths due to heroin overdose. It may be that the state is not at the top of the list, but the state government is concerned that the deemed heroin epidemic is killing more and more people and consumes a large sum of government finances with regards of first responders and overdose calls. This kind of state problem requires immediate attention since the heroin epidemic does not only affect the users themselves but even babies who are being conceived by heroin-addicted mothers. To resolve this problem, the Pennsylvania Department of Drug and Alcohol Programs, under the supervision of Governor Tom Wolf, for emergency responders to provide naloxone to victims of opioid or heroin overdose. Naloxone is a type of medication which targets the reversal of opioid/heroin overdose of which the effects easily takes place and regulates a person’s system back to its normal condition. Naloxone can be achieved by friends or families of users and can administer it without prescription so that they can take immediate action. This declaration under ACT 139 also known as David’s Law aims to decrease the death rates in Pennsylvania related to opioid/heroin overdose.

== See also ==
- List of Pennsylvania state agencies
