= Showdown (sport) =

Sport for persons with a vision impairment

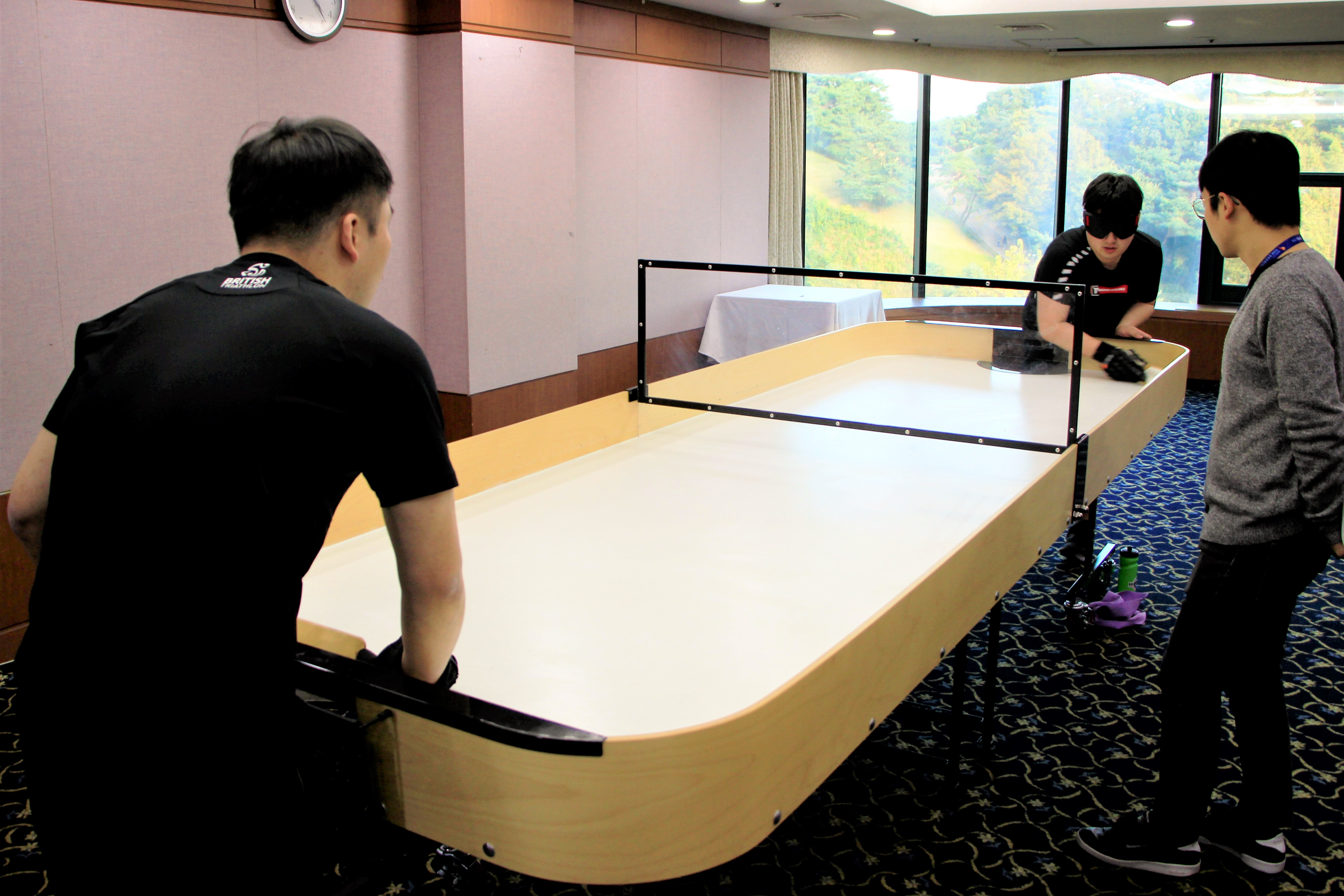
Showdown table and players

Showdown is a sport for persons who are blind and have a vision impairment, considered equivalent to air hockey, or table tennis, with rules governed by the International Blind Sports Federation (IBSA). It is also played by sighted players, but they are not allowed to participate in the IBSA tournaments. In the US it may be called power showdown, and Australia has an adaptation called swish.

== Equipment ==
The sport is comparatively inexpensive to start up, requires minimal maintenance, and can be played in a room the size of a classroom. The only equipment needed is the specially designed table, two paddles, and a special ball into which BBs have been inserted to make it audible. The table can be disassembled and stored away after play if necessary.

The players have to wear eye protection, to ensure that they won't be able to see the ball, and a glove to protect the batting hand.

== Rules ==
The game is played by two players, on a rectangular table with a centre board screen, and goal pockets on either short side. The objective of the game is to bat the ball across the table, under the centreboard screen, into the opponent's goal, while the opponent tries to prevent this from happening.

Play is always initiated with a serve. To serve correctly, players must hit the ball so that it bounces off the side wall of the table exactly once, before passing under the centre screen. If not performed correctly, one point will be awarded to the opponent. Each player serves two times in a row. A player scores two points for a goal and one point when their opponent hits the ball into the screen, hits the ball off the table, touches the ball with the bat or the batting hand within the goal area, touches the ball with anything but the bat, or traps or stops the ball for more than two seconds, making the ball inaudible for the opponent. One point is also awarded to the opponent if a player touches their eye protection without first asking permission.

Players will change sides after each set in match play. In the last set of the match the players will switch sides after six points are scored by one player or after half of stop time has expired. Spectators must be quiet during play, so as not to interfere with the players ability to hear the ball. Cheering is however allowed after the referee has whistled.

Matches are usually played in three sets; best of two wins. The first player to reach 11 points, leading by two or more points wins the set. The exceptions are semifinals, and finals where best of three sets wins.

At sanctioned tournaments, referees must be certified by IBSA, with the approved balls manufactured in Denmark.

== History ==
In 1977 a totally blind Canadian, Joe Lewis, designed a sport so that individuals with vision impairments or blindness could play without sighted assistance. Over the years another Canadian totally-blind athlete, Patrick York, collaborated with Lewis with refinements.

Showdown was an international success at its debut as a demonstration sport during the 1980 Olympiad for the Physically Disabled in Arnhem, the Netherlands. This has led to showdown being played recreationally, and further exhibited at a number of events including regional championships and the IBSA World Games.

== Tournaments and championships ==
The first official IBSA world championship was held in Stockholm, Sweden in August 2009, and included participants from Canada, Czechia, Denmark, Estonia, Finland, Germany, Iran, Italy, Morocco, The Netherlands, Poland, The Slovak Republic, Slovenia, Sweden, and the United States.

IBSA Showdown world championships are usually held every four years. At the 2025 world championships, Poland was ranked the first team, followed by Finland, Belgium, Latvia, Slovakia, Estonia, Slovenia, Germany, South Korea, Bulgaria, Czechia, Denmark, Italy, and Switzerland.

== Regions ==
=== America ===
In the US, Paralympic wrestler Jim Mastro experienced the game at the 2000 Sydney Paralympic Games, and by 2006 called the sport "power showdown" to distinguish it from other uses of the word "showdown".

=== Asia ===
South Korea has formed the Korea Showdown Association for the Disabled (KSAD), and the three-day 2026 IBSA Asia championships will be played in Seoul in August 2026.

=== Europe ===
Showdown is strongest in Europe, with some countries having well-established clubs and competitions. It is played in a number of countries including Switzerland, and the United Kingdom.

At the 11th IBSA Europe championships, in Sofia, Bulgaria, in August 2024, teams were ranked starting with Poland, and followed by Finland, Latvia, Italy, Estonia, Belgium, Slovenia, Denmark, Netherlands, Bulgaria, Slovakia, Czech Republic, and Germany.

=== Oceania ===
Showdown is played in New Zealand through local table-tennis clubs, as well as swish.

== Swish ==
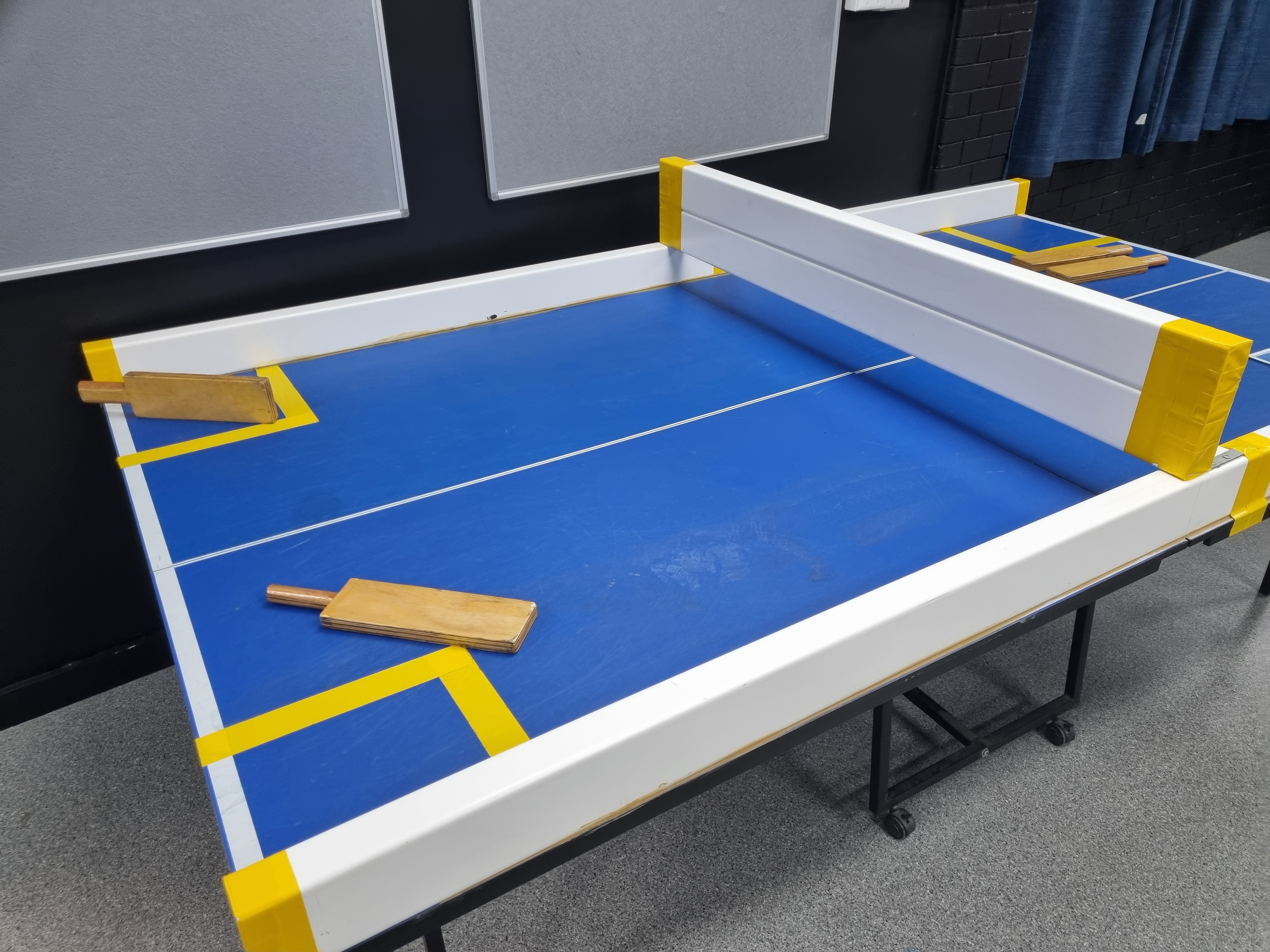
A modified swish table (July 2026). Has reduced height centre board.

Sometimes showdown is confused with swish, which is played in Oceania region. Invented in Victoria, Australia, by Ray Hanner, swish (the sound of a moving ball) is distinguished by the court ends and the wooden net.

While the showdown table looks like an air hockey table, swish resembles a table-tennis table with no back-board. The table-tennis net is replaced by a 75-centimetre (30 in) high wooden board so the other half of the court is entirely obscured other than a 9-centimetre (4 in) bottom gap. The ball is cricket-ball sized, containing rattling bottle caps; and must be hit under the net, not over it. A wooden paddle like showdown is used, and first team to eleven points is the winner. It may be played as singles or doubles, who may or may not have a vision impairment, and does not require eyeshades.

== See also ==
- Blind and low vision tennis
