= Tinny =

Tinny is alternative spelling of tinnie, a slang term with a variety of tin-related meanings.

Tinny or Tinnie may also refer to:

== People ==
- Tinny (musician) (born 1982), Ghanaian rapper
- Tinny Durrell, bassist of The Lemming, a Dutch glam rock band
- nickname of Clinton Percival, 21st century Saint Kitts and Nevis football manager

== Fictional characters ==
- Tinny, nickname of Katrina Doyle, a character in Republic of Doyle, a Canadian television series
- Tinnie Tate, a recurring character in the Garrett P.I. fantasy novel series
- Tinny, a BotTot from the Kei'zatsu tribe in RollBots, a Canadian animated television series
- Tinny, a one-man band in the Toy Story plot draft; later changed to Buzz Lightyear

== Places ==
- Tinnie, New Mexico, United States, an unincorporated community

== See also ==
- Tinne (disambiguation)
- Tinnaya (fem. of "Tinny") or Tinnoye (neut. of "Tinny"), a rural locality (a selo) in Olyokminsky District of the Sakha Republic, Russia
