= Goalball =

Team sport designed for athletes with vision impairment

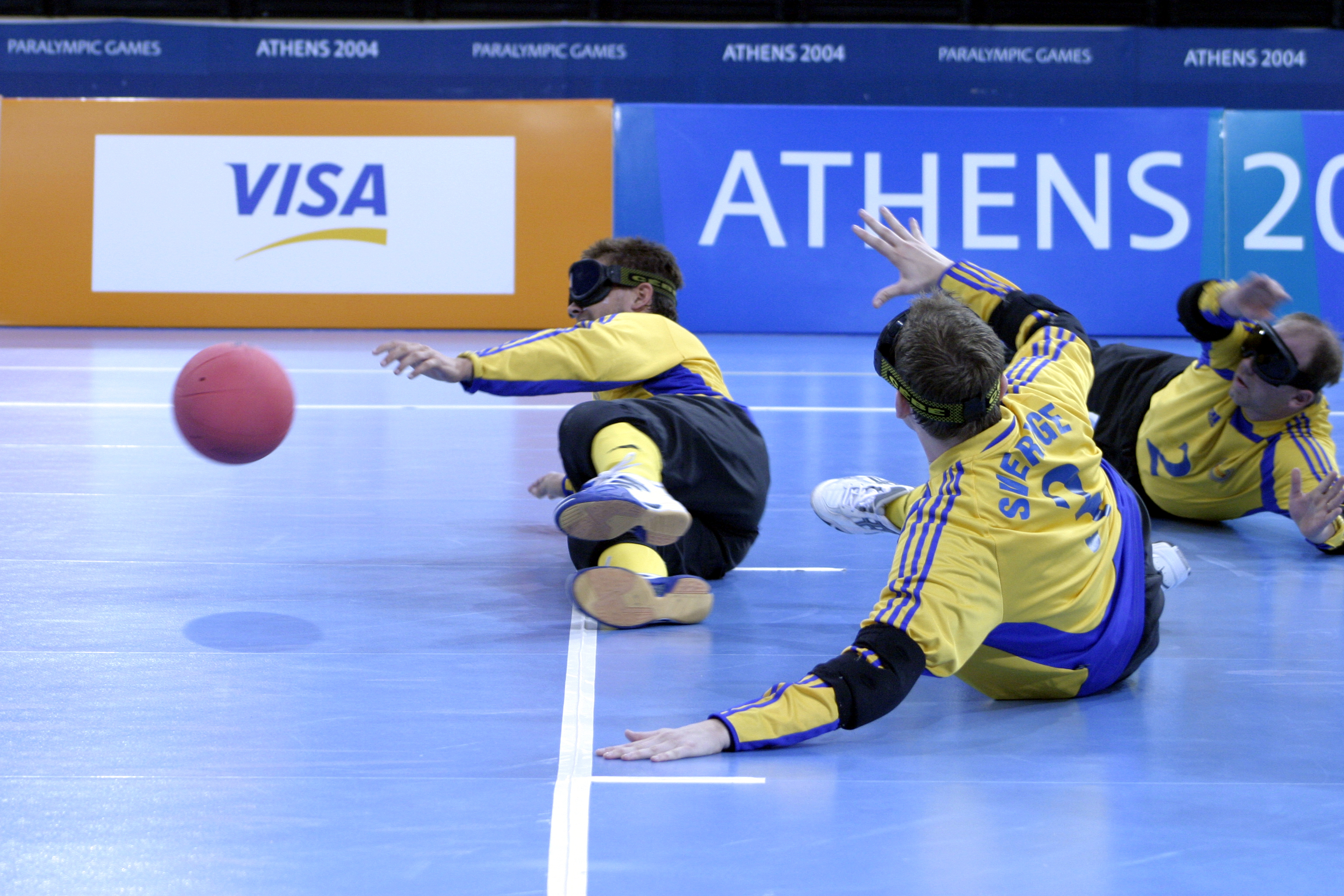
- The Swedish goalball team at the 2004 Summer Paralympics
- Highest governing body: IBSA
- First played: 1946 in Austria

Characteristics
- Contact: None
- Team members: 3 per side
- Mixed-sex: Single
- Type: Team sport; ball game; parasport
- Equipment: Goalball; Eyeshades

Presence
- Country or region: Worldwide
- Paralympic: 1976

Goalball is a team sport designed specifically for athletes with a vision impairment. Participants compete in teams of three, and try to throw a ball with bells embedded inside it into the opponents' goal. The ball is thrown by hand and never kicked. Using ear–hand coordination, originating as a rehabilitation exercise, the sport has no able-bodied equivalent. Sighted athletes are also blindfolded when playing this sport.

Played indoors, usually on a volleyball court, games consist of twelve-minute halves (formerly ten-minute halves) with a five-minute half-time. Where there is a tie, golden goal overtime occurs in the form of one six-minute periods. If the tie persists, a paired shootout ('extra throws' and 'sudden death extra throws') determines the winner. Teams alternate throwing or rolling the ball from one end of the playing area to the other, and players remain in the area of their own goal in both defence and attack. Players must use the sound of the ball to judge its position and movement. Eyeshades allow partially sighted and blind players to compete on an equal footing. Eyepatches may be worn under eyeshades to ensure complete coverage of the eye, and prevent any vision should the eyeshades become dislodged.

The International Blind Sports Federation (IBSA), founded in 1981 and responsible for a range of sports for blind and partially sighted people, is the official governing body for the sport.

== History ==
Goalball was originally devised in 1946 by Hans Lorenzen, a German who later taught at German Sport University Cologne, and Sepp Reindle, an Austrian, as a means of assisting the rehabilitation of visually impaired World War II veterans.

Goalball gradually evolved into a competitive game during the 1950s and 1960s. It was eventually nominated as a demonstration sport at the 1972 Summer Paralympics in Heidelberg, West Germany, and became a Paralympic Games sport at the 1976 Summer Paralympics in Toronto. The sport's first world championship was held in Austria in 1978.

In 2011, the long-standing IBSA Goalball Subcommittee sought to separate from IBSA and form a new international body, the World Goalball Association. IBSA responded by appointing a new committee.

As of 2017, there were 81 competing nations, and 270 international referees. By July 2025 (since November 2011), there were 99 competitive nations for men, and 61 nations for women; and 220 international referees.

== Essentials ==
Goalball field

=== Court and ball ===
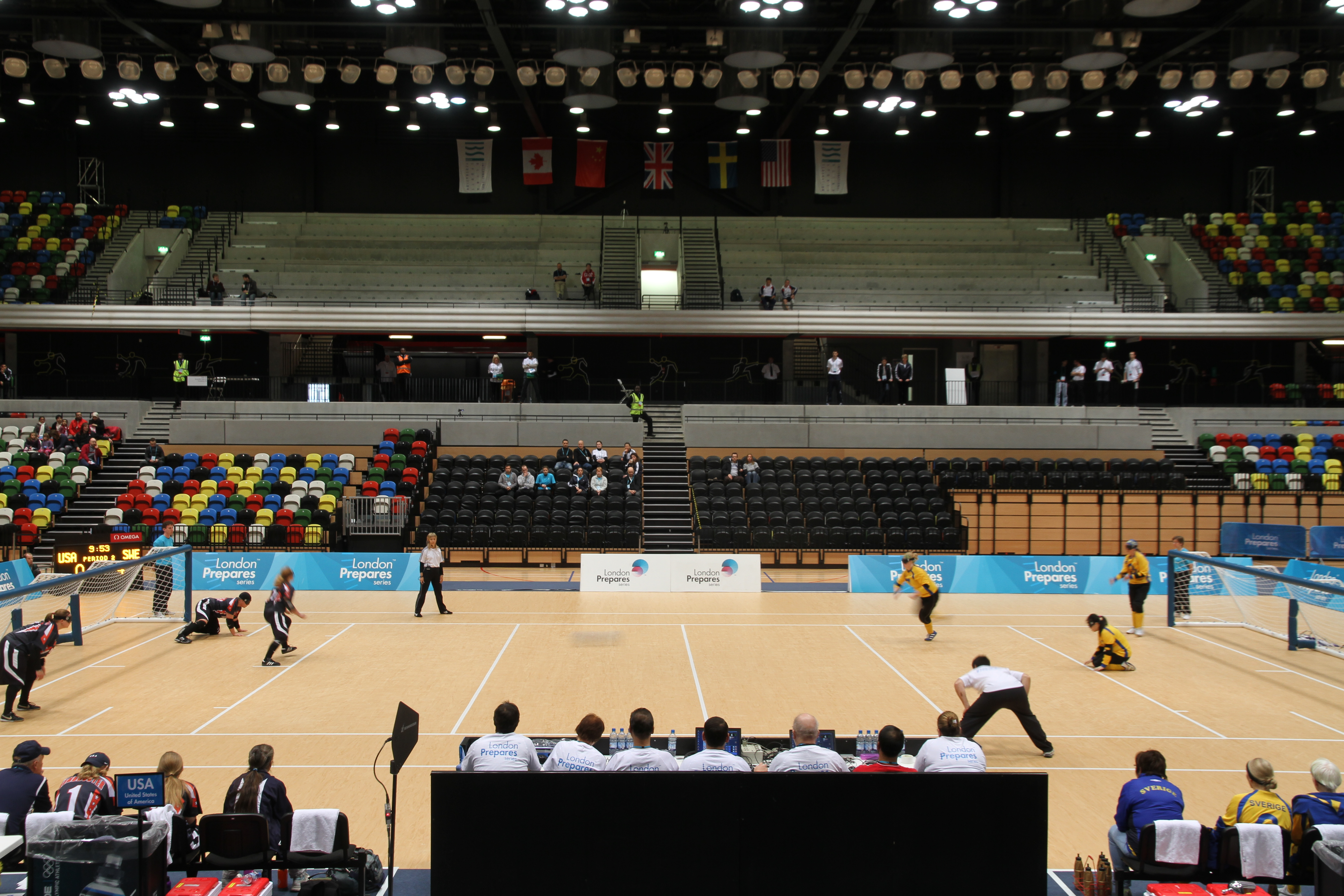
A game of goalball in progress (2012).

Goalball rules require the field of play to be 18 metres (59 ft) long by 9 metres (30 ft) wide. Goals span the width of the pitch. The court is divided into six even sections, 3 by 9 metres (9.8 by 29.5 ft). At either end, just in front of the goal, is the team area. Beyond that is each team's landing zone. The middle two sections are collectively referred to as the neutral zone.

The lines of the court are made by placing tape over lengths of twine. This makes the line both visual (for officials) and tactile (for players). The team area and landing zone, including the boundary, goal lines and high-ball lines, are always marked in this way. Furthermore, the team area has six hash marks (three at the front, one on either side, and one on the goal line) to assist with player orientation.

The ball weighs 1.25 kilograms (2.8 lb) and has eight holes and contains several noise bells. The ball's diameter is around 24 centimetres (9.4 in). A non-official ball of about 0.9 kilograms (2.0 lb) has also been produced by several companies for use by younger players. At the Paralympic level, the ball has been measured leaving the hand in excess of 60 kilometres per hour (37 mph). Despite this, through training and some padding, there are very few injuries.

=== Officials ===
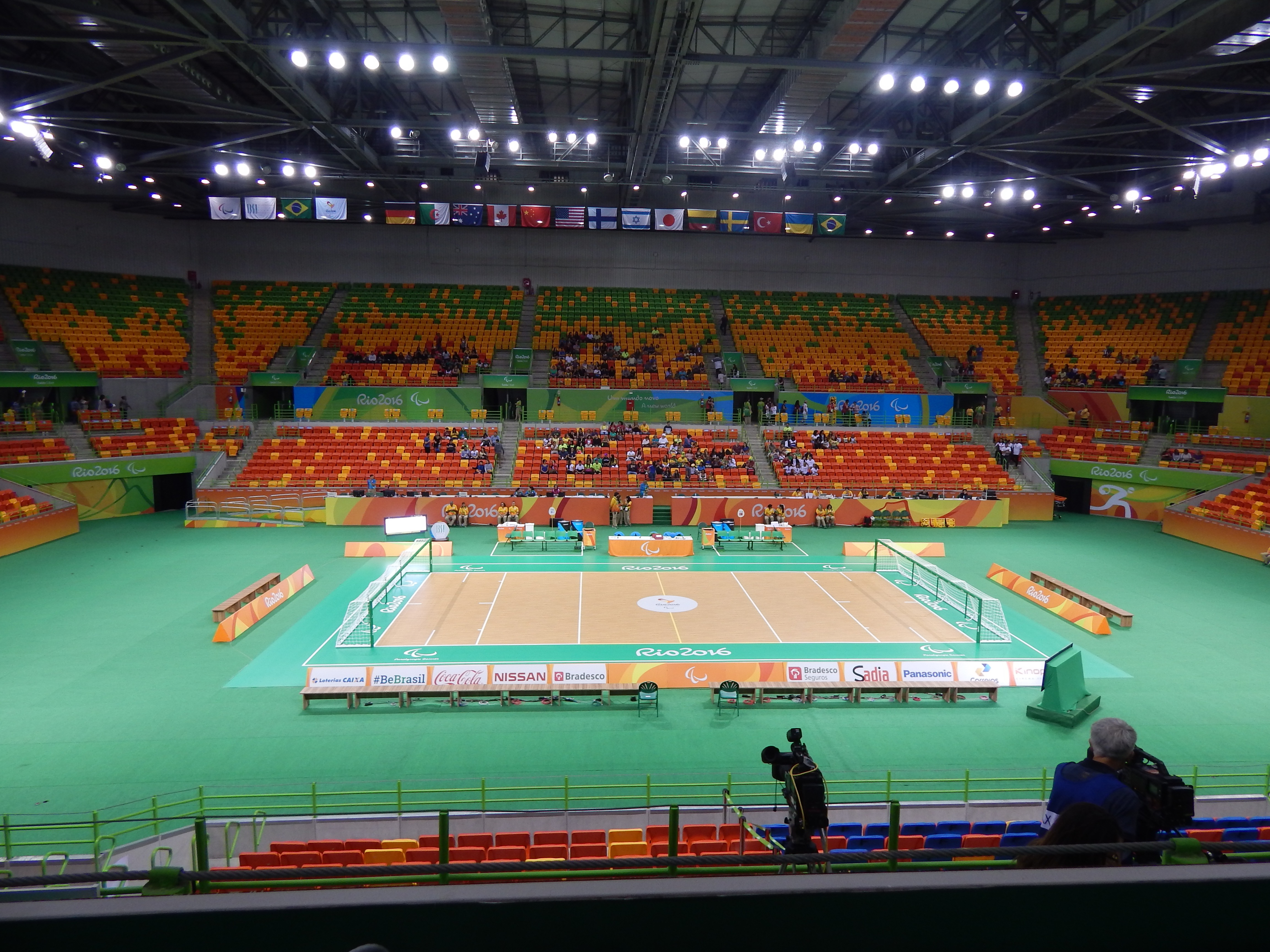
Goalball court at the Future Arena

For competitive games, the following set of officials are on the court:

- Referees (2) — Each referee remains along the sideline at one half of the court. One referee is 'table-side', the other 'off-table side'.
- Goal judges (4) — Positioned to the side of each goal edge, the goal judge raises their hand to confirm to the referee when a ball crosses the goal line. Goal judges are also crucial to the game's speed since they retrieve a ball going off court and drop it at the side hash mark of the team area so play can resume.
- Ten-second timers (2) — Keep track of the time between when a defending player contacts the ball and when the ball is thrown, calling '10 second' penalties when applicable. The role was expanded in the 2018 rule changes to include watching for eyeshade and illegal coaching penalties.
- Scorer — This technical official keeps track of the number of time-outs and substitutions taken by a team and, as the term suggests, keeps score.
- Game timer and back-up timer — The period's time is stopped and started by the referee's whistle. A back-up timer is used in case of power failure to the venue.

=== Players ===
Each team has three players on the court at a time, with one to three substitute players on the bench. At an international level, including the Paralympic Games, the competition is divided into two categories, male and female. There are three standard positions to play: centre, right wing and left wing. While there is typically no official designation, players often have a position they are best at or prefer, though some players will play any of the three and players are free to change position during a match with no prior announcement.

The centre player is most responsible for defence. The player typically lines up at the centre orientation mark at the front of the orientation area (the three-metre [9.8 ft] line forward of the goal post), further forward than the wings which helps to avoid collisions between players diving towards the direction of the ball. Other defensive arrangements are possible, but less common. The centre player is the most defensive position as the player is able to move both to the left and right to defend, covering a greater proportion of possible attacking shot lines. The centre player may also be the defensive coordinator.

The left and right wingers generally line up at the end of the orientation marks from the respective sidelines, at the 1.5-metre (4.9 ft) orientation mark. Their main defensive responsibilities are keeping the ball out of either corner of the goal, though they also defend towards the centre. Typically, the wingers are the main offence because there are some advantages to the angles of shots possible from their positions. This also allows the centre player to reserve their energy for defence, though the centre player may also have an offensive role.

=== Scoring ===
A goal scores one point, and is scored when the ball completely crosses the goal line. The team with the higher score at the end of regulation time is the winner. If regulation results in a tie, one six-minute overtime periods are played, for a golden goal. If no goal is scored during overtime, penalty throws are taken. Should a goal difference of ten be reached, a mercy is called and the leading team is declared the winner.

== Gameplay and etiquette ==
The game relies heavily on the sense of hearing instead of sight, so all outside noise, including cheering, clapping, chanting or ringtones from cellphones, is prohibited. The crowd is therefore repeatedly reminded to remain silent, and referees preface their call "Play!" with "Quiet, please!". Coaches cannot speak whilst the ball is in play, and so cannot influence the game.

Players, regardless of the degree of vision, wear blackened-out eyeshades which allow no light in, to ensure fairness. Fully-sighted individuals may play the sport while wearing eyeshades.

=== Beginning of play ===
The team winning the coin toss usually starts with the ball.

=== Offence ===
To score, a player must roll or bounce the ball down the length of the court, past the opposing defenders, and into the opponents' goal. Typically, the player with the ball will stand, orient themselves using the tactile lines, sounds from teammates, and/or the crossbar of their own goal. The player will then stride forward, lean low, and roll or side arm the ball down the court.

The ball must hit in the player's own landing zone, and anywhere in the neutral zone. So long as it hits each zone, the style of throw is entirely up to that player. Many players will take several strides and release the ball as close to their own high ball line as possible, leaning low to ensure a legal throw. Some players will throw after spinning, transferring the momentum of the spin into additional velocity. Others are able to throw the ball so that it will bounce just once in each of the required zones. Most elite players are effective when using multiple types of throws.

=== Defence ===
The defending players stay within the team area, generally in somewhat staggered positions to avoid collisions. When they hear the other team throw the ball, they 'lay out', that is slide on their hips and stretch their arms above their heads and extend their legs in order to cover as much distance as possible. The objective is simply to keep the ball from getting past with whatever part of the body the player can get in front of it.

Some players prefer to block the ball with their chests and absorb the impact. Others like to block with their legs so the ball will roll up their bodies into their hands. Regardless of method, the players will always try to make themselves as long as possible to block the greatest area.

== Rules ==
=== Infractions ===
Infractions are generally punished by the loss of possession to the other team.

- Premature throw – Throwing the ball before the official has called 'play'.
- Ball over – The ball rebounds off a defending player, the crossbar or goalposts, and crosses back over half-court.

=== Penalties ===
A penalty throw may be awarded for:

- Ten second penalty – A team takes more than ten seconds to throw the ball back over the centre line.
- Delay of game – Can be caused by many different things (coach reporting the wrong numbers for substitutions, a team not arriving in time for the coin toss that precedes the game, too many or too few players taking the court).
- Illegal defence – Called if a defender makes contact with the ball while no part of the body is touching the team area.
- Short ball – The ball fails to reach the opponent's team area when thrown.
- High ball – The ball does not touch the thrower's landing zone when thrown.
- Long ball – The ball does not touch the neutral zone when thrown.
- Eyeshades – Touching eyeshades without permission.
- Unsporting conduct – This can be a variety of things, from arguing with an official to pounding the floor and swearing
- Noise – Unnecessary noise by the offensive team that prevents the defence from tracking the ball.
- Illegal coaching – Coaching from the bench during play or after an official has said 'Quiet please' with intentions of continuing or starting play. From 2006, rules allowed coaching from the bench during an official time-out.

In a penalty situation, a single player is required to defend the entire goal for one throw. The player chosen is determined by the penalty. For instance, a high ball or illegal defence penalty is defended by the player who committed the penalty. On the other hand, an illegal coaching penalty is defended by a player chosen by the coach of the throwing team.

The official rules for the sport are provided on the IBSA website. Rules were adjusted every four years, until January 2025, when the organisation changed it to an annual interval.

Referees may be internationally certified under a structured scheme, from IBSA Goalball Level 1 to Level 3. Goalball world championships and Paralympic tournaments are called by Level 3 referees. Participating countries may also have a national referee scheme.

Changes over time have seen regulation period halves increase from seven, to ten, to the present twelve minutes. Team staff were limited to when coaching could occur, but now it is after any whistled stoppage in play. Rules such as step-over and third-time throw have been removed. The ball must be thrown back towards the opposition goals within ten seconds from contact. In 2014, this was extended to reaching the centre line to ensure a quicker delivery. Eye patching was introduced under the eye shades to reduce cheating. In 2025, half-time was changed from three to five minutes, and overtime went from three-minutes halves to a six-minute period.

== Competitions and events ==
Goalball is played at the Paralympic Games. The number of participating teams has changed over the decades, but for the Paris 2024 Paralympic Games, this was reduced from ten to eight teams per division by the International Paralympic Committee. For the IBSA-sanctioned tournaments, athletes must have a visual impairment classification of B1, B2, or B3.

The IBSA World Goalball Championships has been held every four years since 1978. Championships are held within the regions of Africa, America, Asia-Pacific, and Europe.

Diving as part of defensive skills has been used as a training activity. Professional teams trying goalball have included Boston Bruins, Queensland Fire, and Seattle Sounders FC.

== In popular culture ==
In 2006, the animated series Bernard produced a three-minute clip, featuring Eva the penguin introducing the titular polar bear to goalball.

In 2018 and 2024, the sport was featured in the anime Ani x Para: Anata no Hero wa Dare desu ka. Characters played a match of goalball: KochiKame in the fourth, and Welcome to Demon School! Iruma-kun in the eighteenth. Goalball was featured in episodes 10–12 of the 2020 Japanese anime Breakers, to promote the 2020 Summer Paralympics.

== Gallery ==
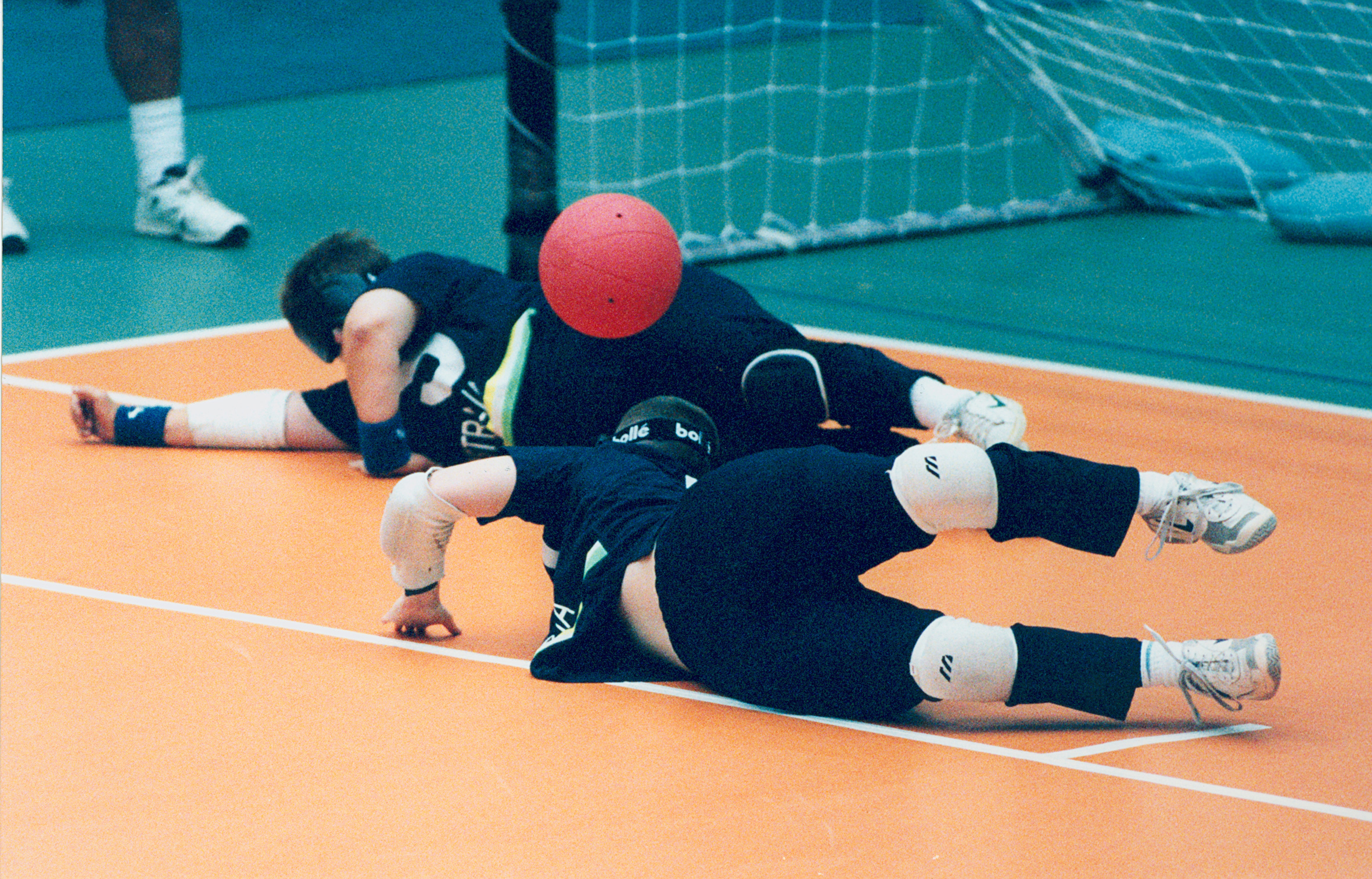
Goalballer Sarah Kennedy (Qld) makes a save for Australia

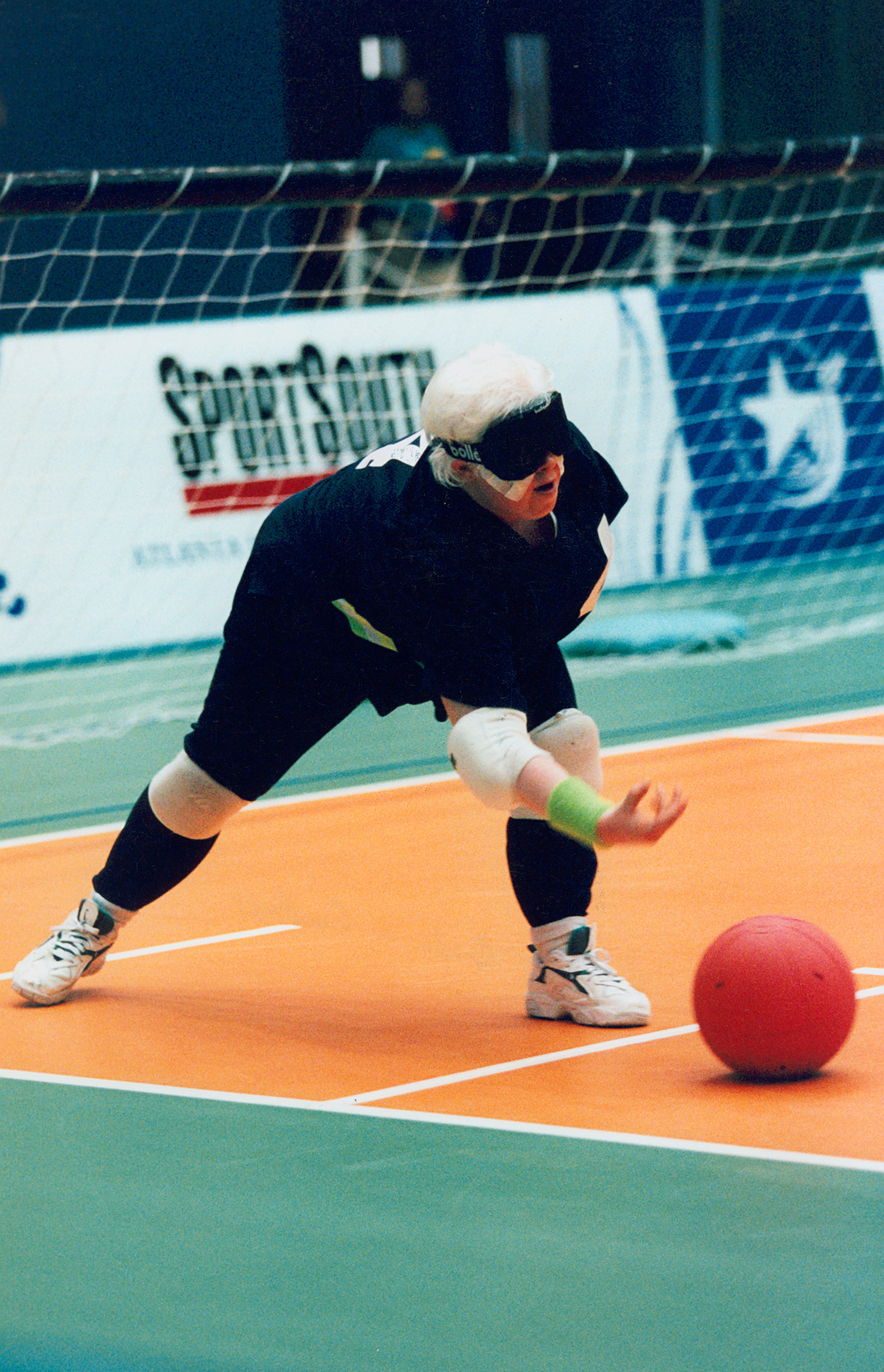
Goalballer Raelene Bock (NSW) competes for Australia

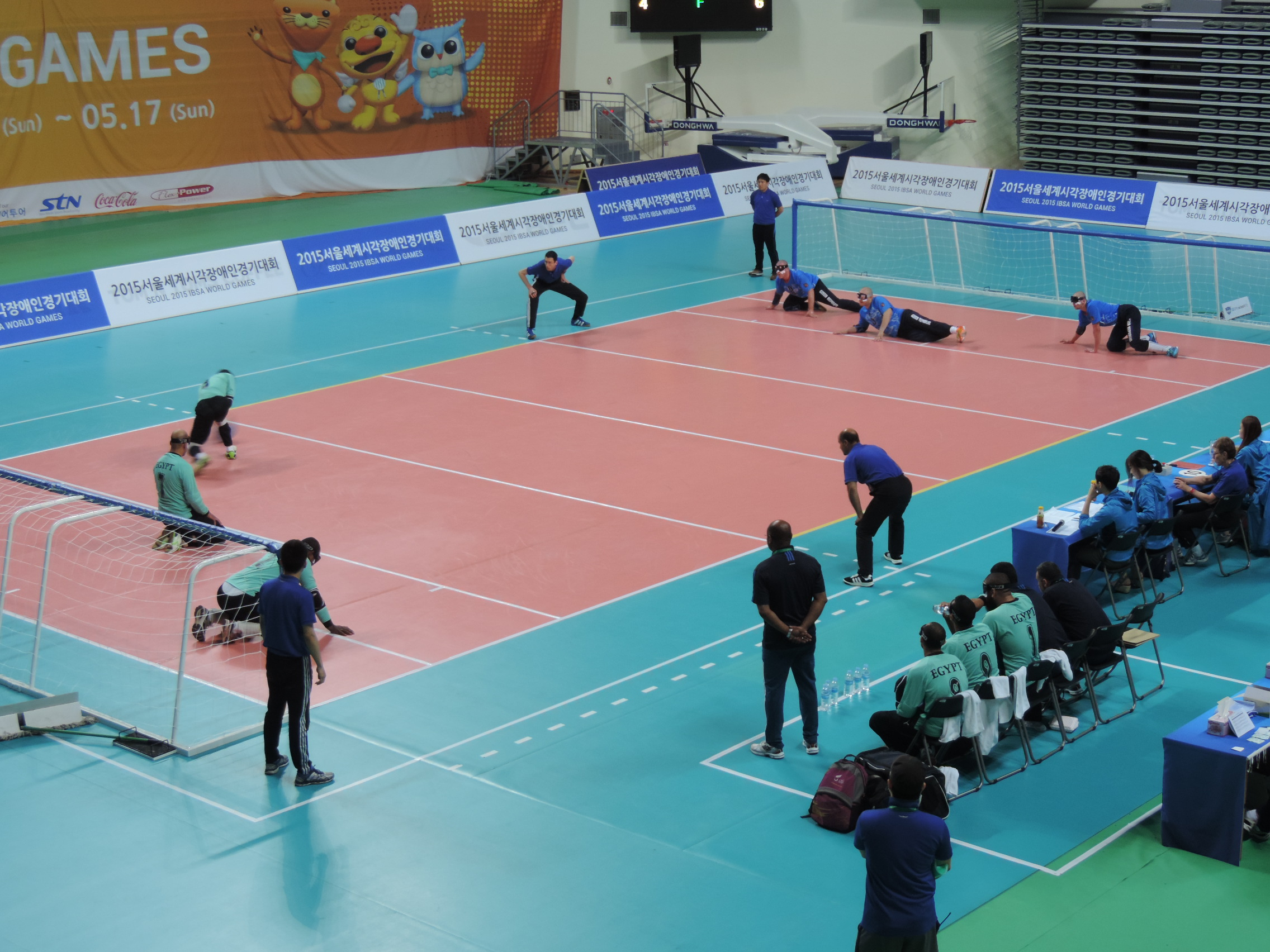
Egypt men's goalball team throwing towards Czech Republic

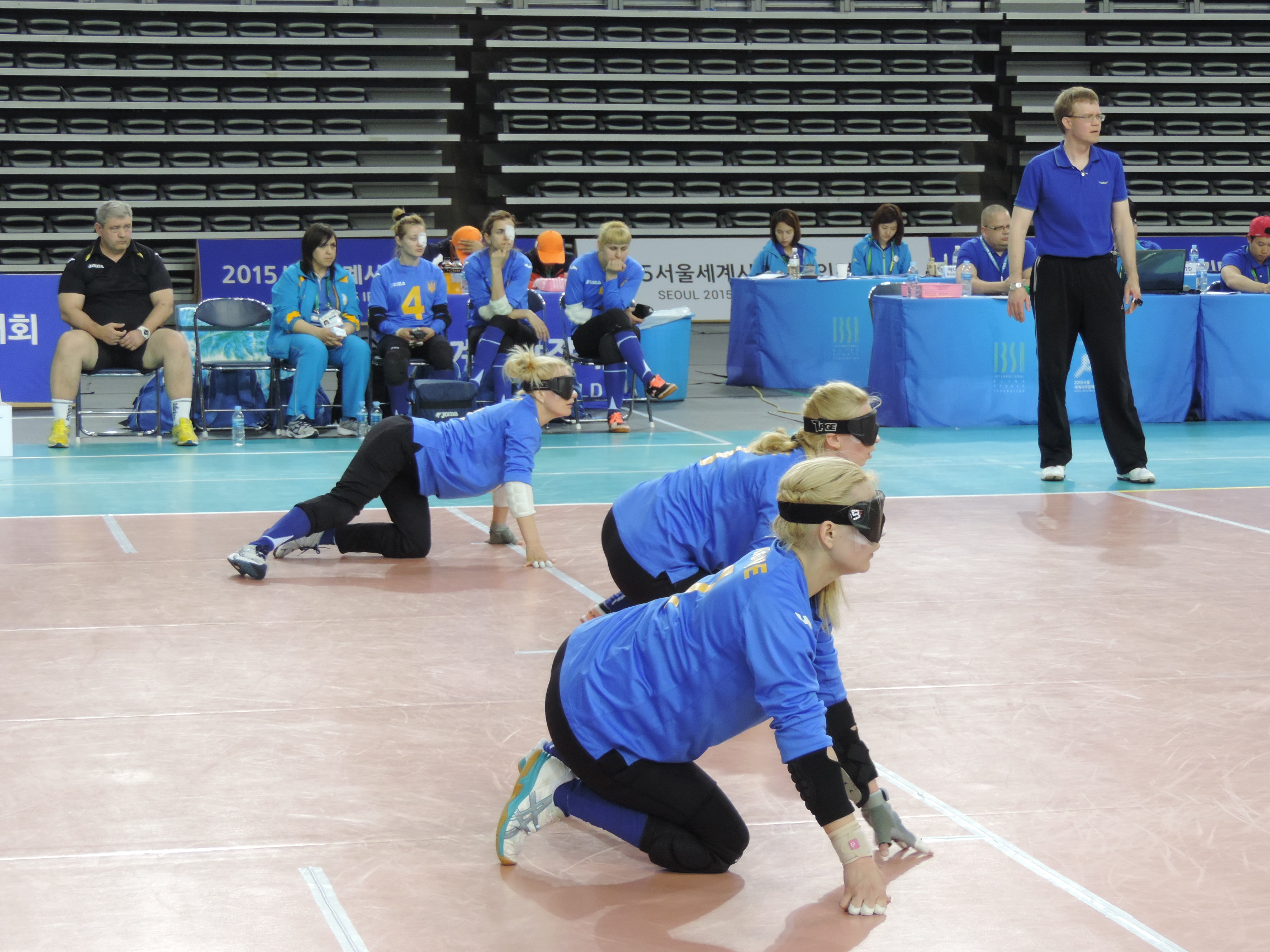
Ukraine women's goalball team preparing to defend against Greece

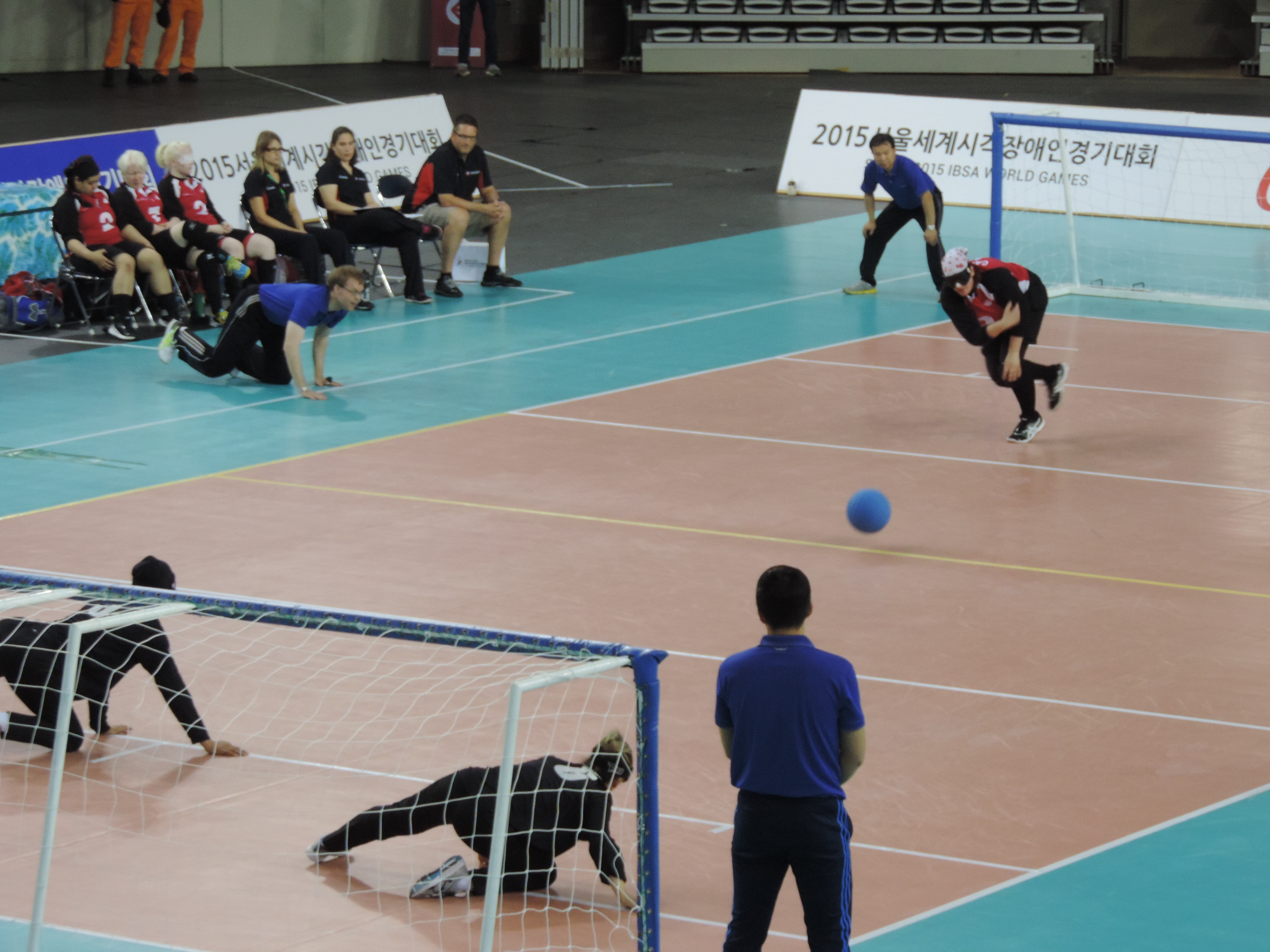
Canada women's goalball team throwing to Algeria

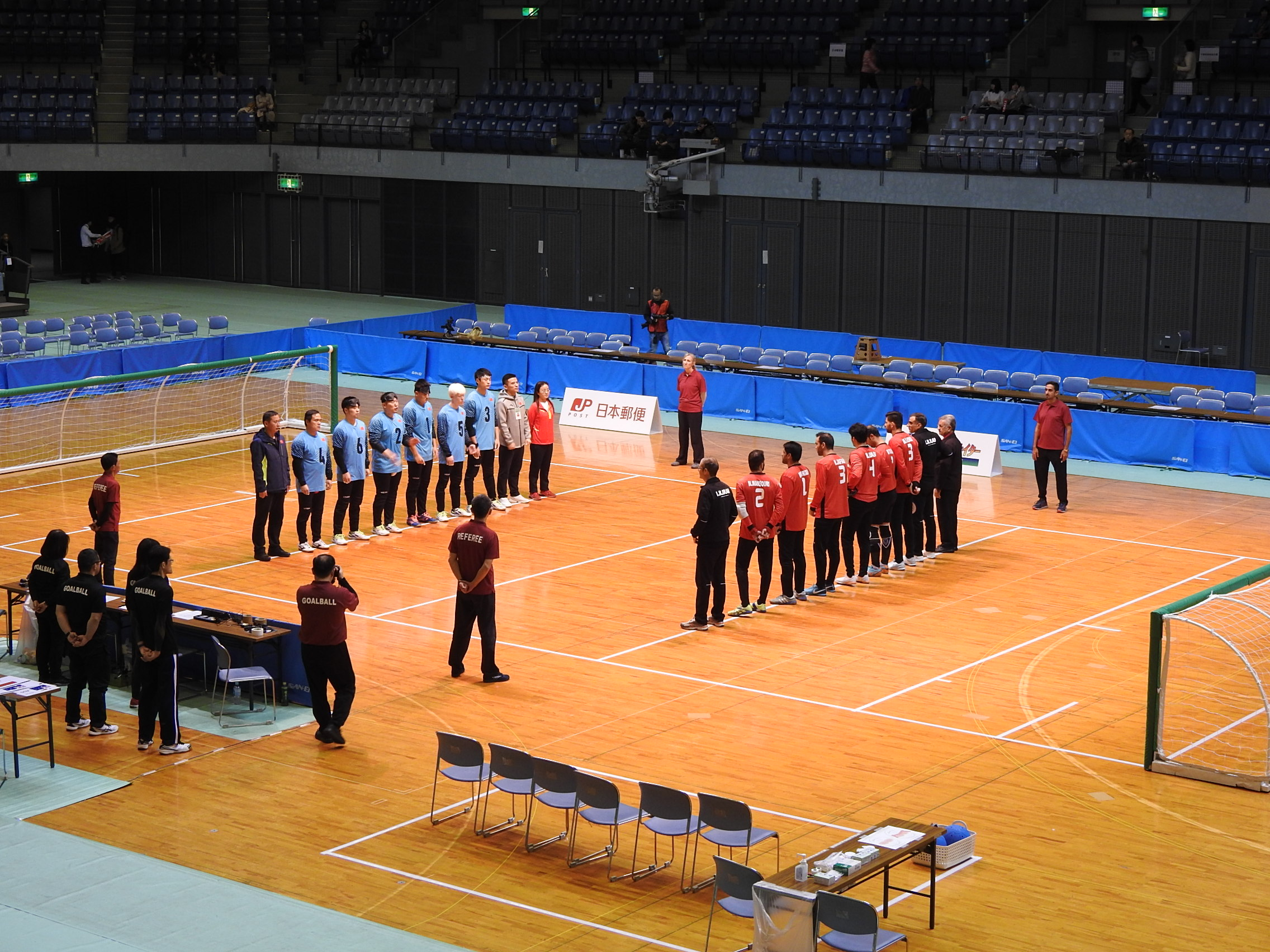
China and Iran men's teams lined-up for the introductions before the start of the game

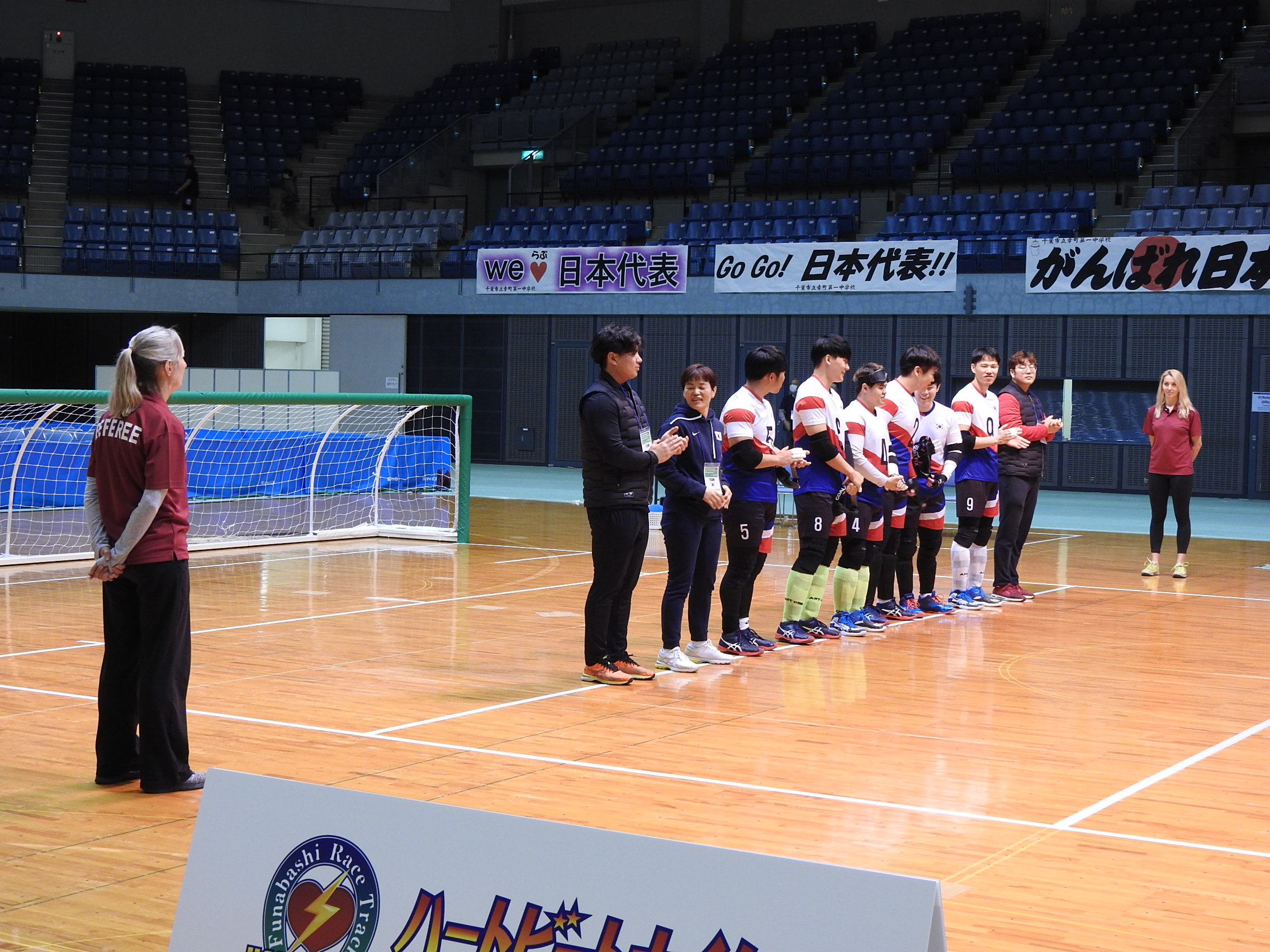
South Korea men's team at line-up

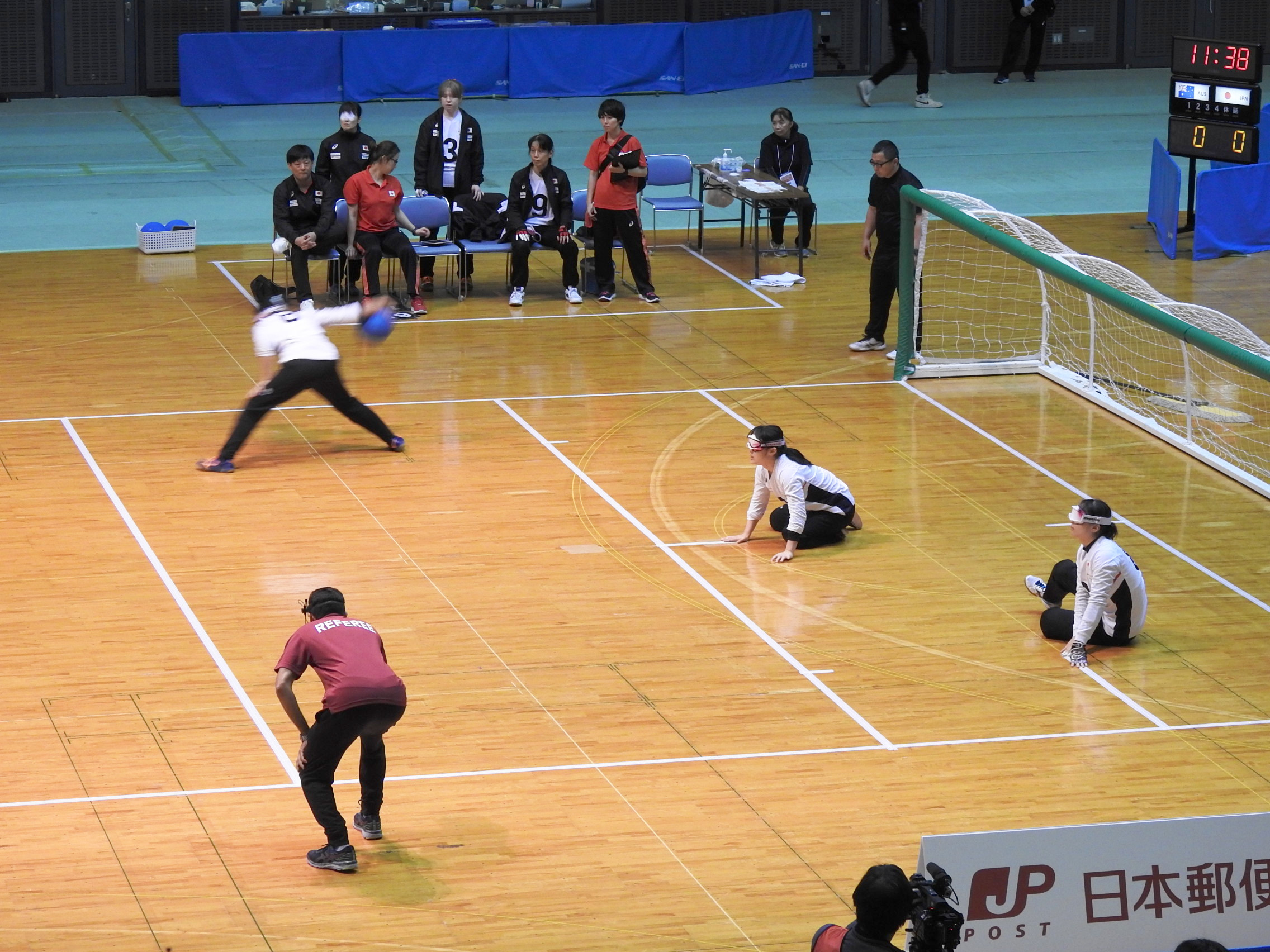
Japan women's team throwing

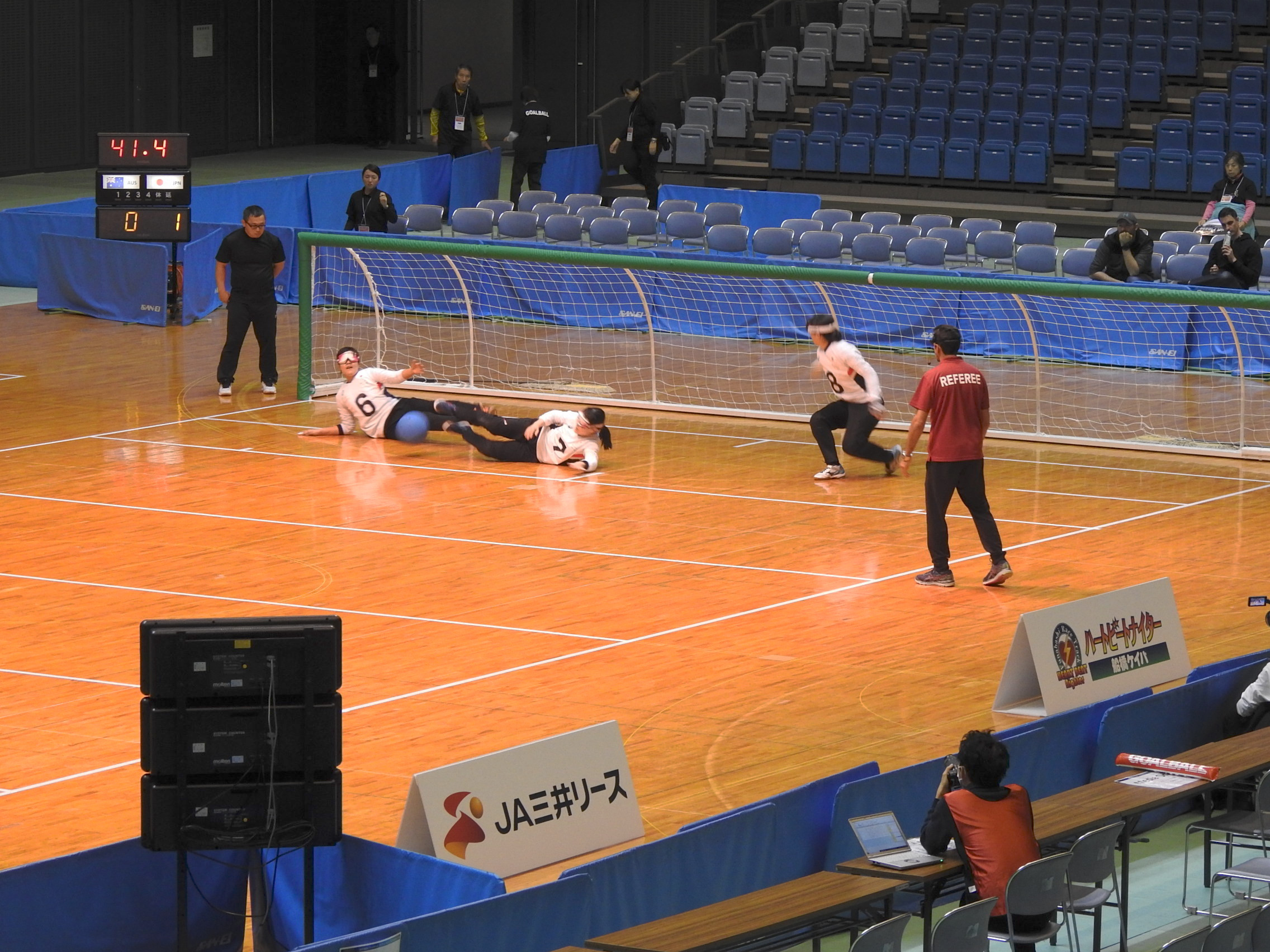
Japan women's team defending

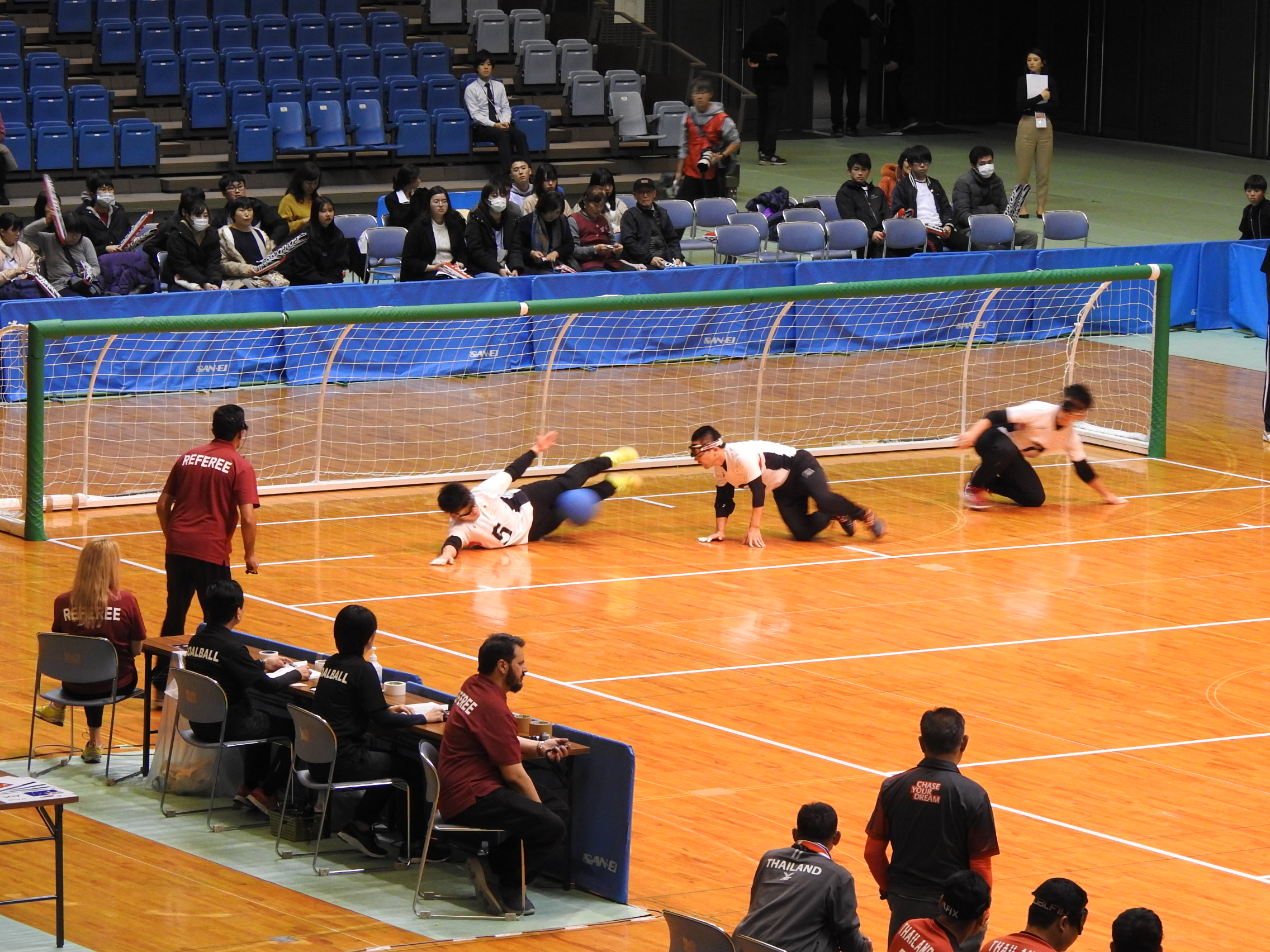
Japan defending a throw from Thailand

== See also ==
- Goalball at the Summer Paralympics
- World Goalball Championships – International sport tournament
- Torball – Sport for persons with a vision impairment
