= Toney Rocks =

American songwriter and solo musician

Toney Robinson (born in Hampton, Virginia), better known by his stage name Toney Rocks, is an American songwriter and solo musician from Las Vegas, Nevada. The Las Vegas Weekly named Rocks as one of 10 Las Vegas Artists to Watch in 2017. A percussionist since age 5, and now favors acoustic instruments and piano.

A departure from his previous two progressive blues-rock albums, “Born to Live Free” (2012) and self-titled 2014 album, his third album, "No Road Too Long" was released March 7, 2016 and is described as a mix of "rock and Americana with blues". Rocks featured in his 2017 tour his latest single “Run to the Night”, produced by Vinnie Castaldo at The Tone Factory recording studio in Las Vegas. Rocks has performed at South by Southwest, The NAMM Show, Folk Alliance International, and has performed with David Bromberg, and has opened for artists such as Corey Harris and Jarekus Singleton. The Dallas Observer wrote that his Folk Alliance performance was "cool and sweet, rocking and lyrical. His songs are thoughtful and hummable."
