= Renné Toney =

Female bodybuilder from Brazil

Renné Toney (sometimes Rene) is a female bodybuilder from Brazil.

== Training and records ==
In February 2006, her biceps were measured at the Arnold Classic Expo and she was officially declared with her right biceps at 20 inches (51 cm) and her left biceps at 20.25 inches (51.4 cm). She achieved her physique after 20 years and became the woman with the largest arms in the world.

- Right Biceps: 20 inches (51 cm)
- Left Biceps: 20.25 inches (51.4 cm)

== Contest history ==
Toney made her debut at the NPC Palm Springs Muscle Classic and finishing second in 1998. Only fours later, she won her first title at the 2002 World Physique Federation (WPF) Pro Ms Olympia Cup II. In 2004, she became repeated the feat and became the champion in the 2004 World Physique Federation Pro Ms. Universe competitions. In 2005, she could only finish sixth in the NABBA Ms. World.
