= Tonne (name) =

Tonne or Tønne may refer to the following people:

== Given name ==
- Tønne Huitfeldt (1625–1677), Norwegian military officer and landowner

== Surname ==
- Erik Tønne (born 1991), Norwegian footballer
- Estas Tonne (born 1975), Ukrainian guitarist
- Grant Hendrik Tonne (born 1976), German politician
- Kåre Tønne, mayor of Trondheim
- Lisa Tønne, Norwegian comedian
- Tore Tønne, Norwegian politician
- Wolfgang Tonne, German World War II fighter pilot
- Wulfhilda Tonne, character from Strike Witches

== See also ==
- Tonne (disambiguation)
