= B4 (classification) =

Blindness sports classification

B4 is a medical based Paralympic classification for blind classification used in a variety of sports including sailing, bowls, swimming, and cycling. Unlike other blind sport classes, it only uses visual acuity for the purpose of being classed into it.

== Definition ==
This is a medical classification for people with visual impairments. Unlike other blind sport classes, it only uses visual acuity for the purpose of being classed into it. BlindSports SA defines this classification as "This is from visual acuity above 6/60 up to and including visual acuity of 6/24 (up to 25%). No visual field is considered." USABA defines this classification as "from visual acuity above 20/200 and up to visual acuity of 20/70 and a visual field larger than 20 degrees in the best eye with the best practical eye correction."

== Governance ==
In the United States, this classification is governed by the United States Association of Blind Athletes (USABA). In New Zealand, this classification is governed by Blind Sport New Zealand. In the United Kingdom, the classification is governed by British Blind Sport (BBS), which is recognised nationally by Sport England.

On a sport specific level, Blind Sailing handles national governance related to this class in the United Kingdom. BBS handles governance for blind cricket in the United Kingdom. In golf in Scotland, classification is handled by Scottish Blind Golf.

== Sport ==
Competitors in this classification are not eligible to compete in international competitions. The classification is used in national competitions in Canada, Australia, the United States and the United Kingdom. It is used in a variety of sports including sailing, bowls, swimming, and cycling. B4 cyclists compete on tandem bicycles with a guide rider. Junior IBSA blind sailing events sometimes allow for B4 competitors in international events.

In blind cricket, B1, B2, B3 and B4 cricketers all play at the same time, but a maximum combined total of seven B2, B3 and B4 cricketers are allowed on the field at one time. Scottish Blind Golf gives golfers in this classification a maximum handicap of 28 for men, with the handicap for women being slightly higher.

While historically the English National Association of Visually Handicapped Bowlers had included limited field of vision as a consideration for this class, it was dropped because this vision issue did not impact ability in bowls.

For swimming, the classification was eligible to compete at the 2012 Blind Sporting Association Australian Swimming Championships.

There is an equivalent to this classification in blind archery known as VI Open, which is open to people with visual acuity of less than 20 degrees. They should be able to use a bow sight.

Equestrian sport is not open to Paralympic sport in this classification.

== History ==
This classification traces its history to the early history of blind sport. There was a belief that those with vision impairment that was less severe had a competitive advantage over competitors who had more severe impairment. Classification was developed by the IBSA to insure more even competition across the different bands of visual acuity.

The International Sports Organization for the Disabled (ISOD) developed a blind classification system in 1976. The rise of the IBSA meant the ISOD classification system did not dominate as the primary classification system for blind sports competitors. The early classification system for blind sport was developed by the IBSA in 1980.

The International Paralympic Committee made an attempt in 2003 to address "the overall objective to support and co-ordinate the ongoing development of accurate, reliable, consistent and credible sport focused classification systems and their implementation."

=== B4+ ===
There is a blind sport classification above B4 called B4+. This is used in the United Kingdom and is defined as "an individual with an acuity of 6/24 would be able to read the three top lines on a Snellen chart at six metres."
