= Torry (disambiguation) =

Torry may refer to the following

- Torry an area within the city of Aberdeen, Scotland
- Torry (name), a list of people with this surname, nickname and given name

== See also ==
- Terry (disambiguation)
- Torcy (disambiguation)
- Torr (disambiguation)
- Torre (disambiguation)
- Torrey (disambiguation)
- Torri (disambiguation)
- Tory (disambiguation)
- Torry Academy, former secondary school in Torry, Aberdeen
- Torry Battery, artillery battery in Torry, Aberdeen
- Torry Burn (disambiguation)
- Torry freshness, a fish freshness scoring system
- Torry Hill, family estate in Kent, England
- Torry Hill Railway, miniature railway in Kent, England
- Torry-Crittendon Farmhouse is a historic home in Greene County, New York.
- USS Torry (AKL-11), United States Navy cargo ship
