= Torie =

Torie is a given name and a nickname. Notable people with this name include the following

== Given name ==
- Torie Osborn (born 1950), Danish activist, and author

== Nickname ==
- Victoria Clarke (born 1959), American communications consultant known as Torie

== See also ==
- Terie Norelli
- Tore (disambiguation)
- Tori (disambiguation)
- Toriel
- Tories (British political party)
- Tories (Scotland)
- Torii (surname)
- Toril (disambiguation)
- Torin (given name)
- Torje Olsen Solberg
- Torke (disambiguation)
- Torpe (disambiguation)
- Torre (name)
- Towie (disambiguation)
- Tyrie (disambiguation)
