= Torrie =

Torrie is a given name and surname. Notable people with the name include:

== Given name ==
- Torrie Cox (born 1980), American football player
- Torrie Groening (born 1961), Canadian photographer
- Torrie Robertson (born 1961), Canadian ice hockey player
- Torrie Wilson (born 1975), American professional wrestler and entertainer

== Nickname/pseudonym ==
- Torrie Zito, nickname for Salvatore Zito (1933–2009), American pianist, music arranger, composer and conductor
- Malcolm Torrie, a pseudonym for Gladys Mitchell (1901–1983), English author

== Surname ==
- Pamela Carruthers (née Torrie, 1916–2009), British equestrian
- Thomas Jameson Torrie (died 1858), Scottish geologist and botanist

== See also ==
- Torrey (name), given name and surname
- Terrie
- Torie
- Torre (name)
- Torri (disambiguation)
