= Torii (disambiguation) =

A torii (鳥居) is a traditional Shinto shrine gate.

Torii may refer to:

- Torii family, a samurai clan
- Torii school, a school of ukiyo-e artists
- Torii (surname), a Japanese surname
- Torii Hunter (born 1975), American baseball player

== See also ==
- Tori (disambiguation)
- Torie, a given name and nickname
- Toril (disambiguation)
- Torin (disambiguation)
- Torri (disambiguation)
