= Torry (name) =

Torry is a given name, nickname and surname. Notable people with this name include the following:

== Given name ==
- Torry Holt (born 1976), American gridiron football player
- Torry Gillick (1915-1971), Scottish footballer
- Torry Larsen (born 1971), Norwegian explorer
- Torry McTyer (born 1995), American gridiron football player
- Torry Pedersen (born 1957), Norwegian newspaper editor

== Nickname ==
- Torry Castellano, nickname of Torrance Heather Castellano (born 1979), American percussionist

== Surname ==
- Clare Torry (born 1947), British singer
- Guy Torry (born 1969), American actor and comedian
- Joe Torry (born 1965), American actor and comedian
- John Torry (1800 – 1879), Scottish priest
- Mads Torry (born 1986), Danish football player
- Patrick Torry (1763–1852), Scottish Anglican bishop
- Peter Torry (born 1948), UK Ambassador

== See also ==
- Terry (given name)
- Terry (surname)
- Torey (name)
- Torr (surname)
- Torre (name)
- Torrey (name)
- Torri (disambiguation)
- Tory (disambiguation)
- Torny Pedersen
