= Tori =

Tori may refer to:

== Places ==
- Tori (Georgia), an historic province of the nation of Georgia
- Tori Parish, Pärnu County, Estonia
- Tori, Estonia
- Tori, Ghana, a village in the kingdom of Chumburung, Ghana
- Tori, Järva County, Estonia
- Tori, Mali
- Tori Railway Station, in Chandwa, Latehar district, Jharkhand, India
- Tori-Bossito, Atlantique Department, Benin
- Tori-Cada, Atlantique Department, Benin
- Tori (Rampur), Amreli, Gujarat, India
- Tori Fatehpur Jhansi District in the state of Uttar Pradesh.

== Other uses ==
- Taiwan Ocean Research Institute (TORI), an oceanographic research organization
- Tori (horse), a breed of horse
- Tori (EP), a 2023 EP by Tori Kelly
- Tori (journal) (1915–1986), predecessor to the Japanese Journal of Ornithology
- Tori (martial arts), the executor of a technique in partnered martial arts practice
- Tori (name), including a list of people with the name
- Tori Style, the artistic style of the Japanese Asuka period
- Tori, the plural of Torus, a kind of geometric object that includes doughnut-shaped objects
- Tori (wrestler), American bodybuilder and professional wrestler
- Tori (album), a 2024 album by Tory Kelly

== See also ==
- Mandibular tori, bony growths in the mandible
- Palatal tori, the bony growths in the palate
- Torii (disambiguation)
- Torikeskus (disambiguation), name of several shopping centres in Finland
- Torishima (disambiguation), the name of several islands in Japan
- Tory (disambiguation)
