= Cada =

Cada may refer to:

== People ==
- David Čada (born 1986), Czech football player
- Joe Cada (born 1987), American poker player
- Josef Čada (1881–1959), Czech gymnast
- Petra Cada (born 1979), Canadian table tennis player

== Places ==
- Azohouè-Cada, Benin
- Tori-Cada, Benin

== Other ==
- CADA, Argentine Athletics Confederation
- CADA, Australian radio station
- CaDA Bricks, a Chinese toy manufacturer
- Cada is Spanish for every and each.
