= Torill =

Norwegian female given name

Torill, also written Toril and Thorill, is a Norwegian feminine given name. It may refer to:

- Toril Brekke (born 1949), Norwegian novelist and author
- Torill Eide (born 1950), Norwegian children's writer
- Torill Eidsheim (born 1970), Norwegian politician
- Torill Fjeldstad (born 1958), Norwegian alpine skier
- Torill Fonn (born 1967), Swedish ultramarathon runner
- Toril Førland (born 1954), Norwegian alpine skier
- Thorill Gylder (born 1958), Norwegian racewalker
- Toril Hallan, Norwegian ski-orienteering competitor
- Toril Hetland Akerhaugen (born 1982), Norwegian footballer
- Torhild Johnsen (born 1934), Norwegian politician
- Torill Kove (born 1958), Norwegian-born Canadian film director and animator
- Toril Marie Øie (born 1960), Norwegian judge
- Toril Moi (born 1953), American literature academic
- Torill Selsvold Nyborg (born 1952), Norwegian nurse, missionary and politician
- Torill Thorstad Hauger (1943–2014), Norwegian non-fiction writer and illustrator

== See also ==
- Toril (disambiguation)
- Torhild, a related name
