= Torren =

Torren is a given name. Notable people with the name include:

- Torren Ecker (born 1985), American politician
- Torren Foot, Australian house music producer

== See also ==
- Torre (name)
- Torres (surname)
- Torrey (name)
