= Torrey =

Torrey may refer to:

== People and fictional characters ==
- Torrey (name), a list of people with the given name or surname
- Rockwell "Rock" Torrey, protagonist of the 1965 war film In Harm's Way, played by John Wayne

== Places ==
- Torrey, New York, United States, a town
- Torrey, Utah, United States, a town
- Torrey Mountain, Montana - see List of mountains in Beaverhead County, Montana
- Torrey Peak (Wyoming), United States, a mountain

== See also ==
- Torrey bulrush or Torrey's bulrush, Schoenoplectus torreyi, a bulrush species
- Torrey maple, a variety of Acer glabrum, a maple tree species
- Torrey pine, endangered tree species Pinus torreyana
- Torrey wolfberry, common name of Lycium torreyi, a species of flowering plant
- Torri (disambiguation)
- Torrie, a list of people with the given name or surname
