= Thorild =

Thorild may refer to:

- Torhild, a given name (including a list of people with the name)
- Thomas Thorild (1759–1808), Swedish poet, critic, feminist and philosopher

== See also ==
- Thorhild, Alberta
