= Gröning =

Gröning or Groening is a Dutch surname meaning 'one who wears green', or a variant of the German Grüning. and may refer to:

- Amy Groening, Canadian actress
- Birger Gröning (born 1975), German politician
- Bruno Gröning (1906–1959), was a healer from Germany
- Matt Groening (born 1954), American cartoonist, screenwriter and producer
- Homer Groening (1919–1996), Canadian filmmaker
- Oskar Gröning (1921–2018), German SS-Unterscharführer and Auschwitz concentration camp worker
- Peter Gröning (born 1939), former East German track cyclist
- Philip Gröning (born 1959), German director, documentary film maker, and screenwriter
- Torrie Groening (born 1961), Canadian artist

== See also ==
- Groaning
