= Olga Bezsmertna =

Ukrainian operatic soprano

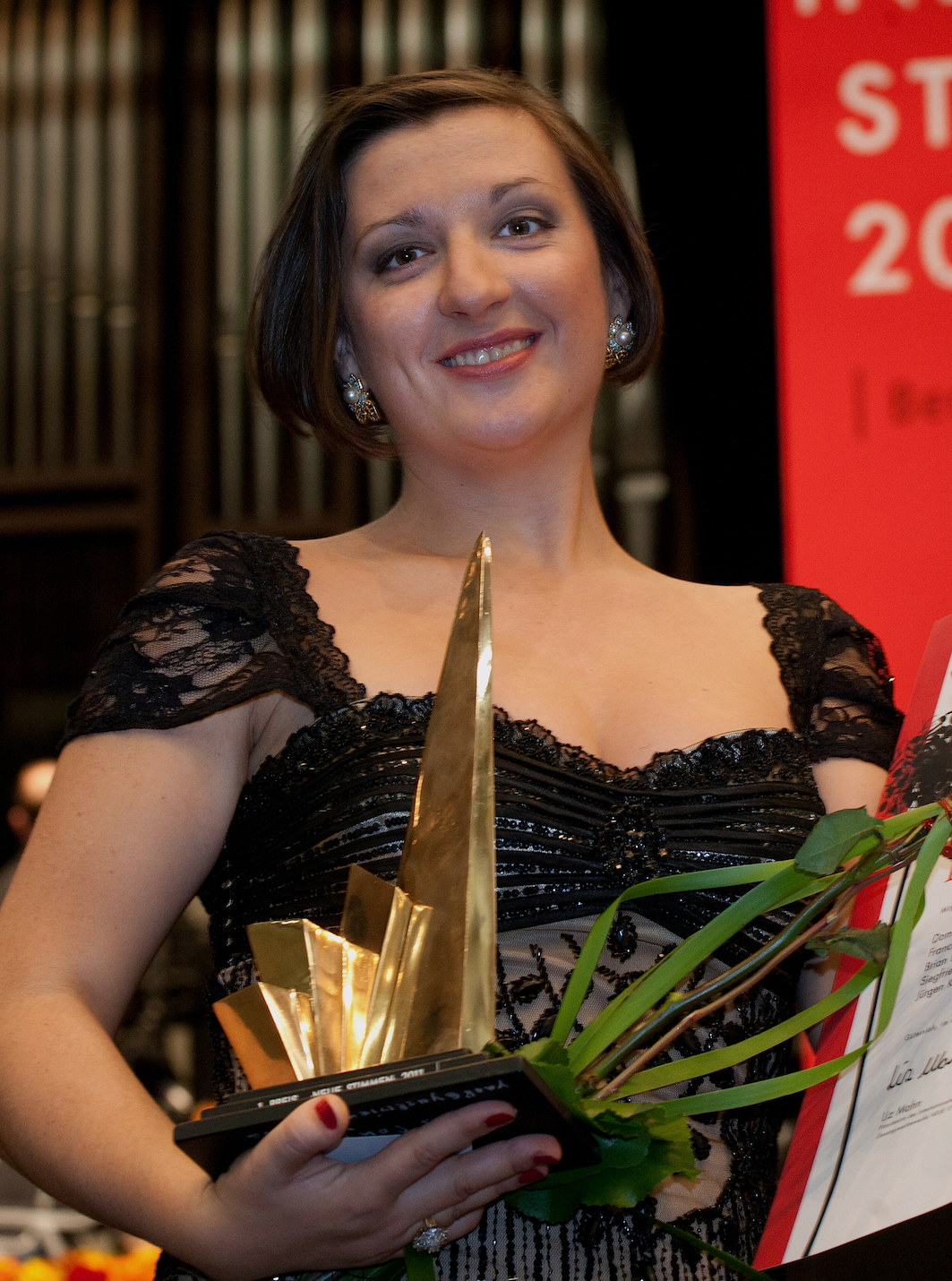
- Bezsmertna in 2011
- Born: 6 August 1983 (age 42); Bohuslav, Ukrainian Soviet Socialist Republic, Soviet Union
- Education: Kyiv Conservatory
- Occupation: Operatic soprano
- Organization: Vienna State Opera

Olga Bezsmertna (Ukrainian: Ольга Безсмертна, romanized: Olha Bessmertna; born 6 August 1983) is a Ukrainian operatic soprano based at the Vienna State Opera. She was engaged there after winning the Neue Stimmen competition in 2011, and soon performed leading roles such as Dvořák's Rusalka and Rachel in Halévy's La Juive. She appeared as Tatyana in Tchaikovsky's Eugene Onegin at the Zürich Opera House, as Diana in Cavalli's La Calisto at La Scala in Milan, and as the Countess in Mozart's Figaro at the Bavarian State Opera.

== Life and career ==
Olga Bezsmertna was born in Bohuslav. She studied voice at the Kyiv Conservatory, graduating in 2010. Already in 2007, she was engaged at the Oder-Spree Festival. Bezsmertna was successful at several international competitions between 2006 and 2011. When she won the first prize of the Neue Stimmen in 2011, Dominique Meyer, director of the Vienna State Opera led the jury, and engaged her for his house the following year. Her first role there was Lora in Wagner's Die Feen on 19 March 2012. Ten days later, she appeared as The Lady in Hindemith's Cardillac. She further performed there as both Pamina and the First Lady in Mozart's Die Zauberflöte, Donna Elvira in Don Giovanni, and The Countess in Figaro. In 2014, she appeared in the title role of Dvořák's Rusalka and the following year Rachel in Halévy's La Juive. At the Vienna Opera Ball 2015, Bezsmertna sang the aria "Dove sono" from Figaro. In summer 2015, the singer made her debut as Marzelline in Beethoven's Fidelio at the Salzburg Festival, staged by Claus Guth and conducted by Franz Welser-Möst. Bezsmertna sang in Strauss's Die Liebe der Danae at the Salzburg Festival, and made her debut at Zürich Opera House as Tatyana in Tchaikovsky's Eugene Onegin in the 2017/2018 season. In 2021, she made her role and house debut as Diana in Cavalli's La Calisto at La Scala. In 2022, she appeared as the Countess at the Bavarian State Opera.

Bezsmertna has performed at the Deutsche Oper Berlin, the Staatstheater Wiesbaden and with the Deutsche Radio Philharmonie Saarbrücken Kaiserslautern. She works with conductors such as Valery Gergiev, Ádám Fischer, Alain Altinoglu, James Conlon and Christian Thielemann.

=== Personal life ===
Bezsmertna is married and a mother of three children. Her husband studied theology.

== Awards ==
- 2006 International Rimsky-Korsakov Vocal Competition in St. Petersburg
- 2008 1st Prize, Puccini Special Prize, DEBUT Singing Competition
- 2010 and 2011 Finalist, International Hans Gabor Belvedere Singing Competition in Vienna
- Summer 2011 Participant of the Young Singers Project of the Salzburg Festival
- 2011 1st Prize, Neue Stimmen
