= Torey =

Torey is a given name, nickname and surname. Notable people with this name include the following:

== Given name ==
- Torey Adamcik (born 1990), one of the two murderers of Cassie Jo Stoddart
- Torey Defalco (born 1997), American volleyball player
- Torey Hunter (born 1972), American football player
- Torey Krug (born 1991), American ice hockey player
- Torey Malatia (born 1951), American journalist, radio producer, and public media manager
- Torey Pudwill (born 1990), American street skateboarder
- Torey Thomas (born 1985), American basketball player

== Nickname ==
- Torey Lovullo, nickname of Salvatore Anthony Lovullo (born 1965), American baseball manager and coach
- Torey Hayden, nickname of Victoria Lynn Hayden (born 1951), American teacher, lecturer and writer

== Surname ==
- Mike Torey (died 2013), Nigerian army officer

== See also ==
- Torey Lakes
- Torcy (disambiguation)
- Tore (disambiguation)
- Tori (name)
- Torre (name)
- Torrey (name)
- Tory (disambiguation)
- Trey (disambiguation)
