= Neue Stimmen =

International singing competition

Coordinates: 51°54′30″N 08°25′07″E

International Singing Competition Neue Stimmen
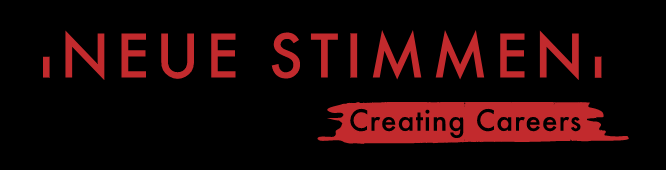
- Location: Gütersloh, North Rhine-Westphalia
- Country: Germany
- Presented by: Bertelsmann Stiftung
- First award: 1987
- Website: neue-stimmen.de

Neue Stimmen (New Voices) is an international singing competition. It was established in 1987 on the initiative of Liz Mohn with the support of August Everding to promote opera's young talent. It is considered an important forum for new talent, one that has marked the beginning of international careers for many participants. The singing competition was hosted every two years by the Bertelsmann Stiftung in Gütersloh.

== History ==
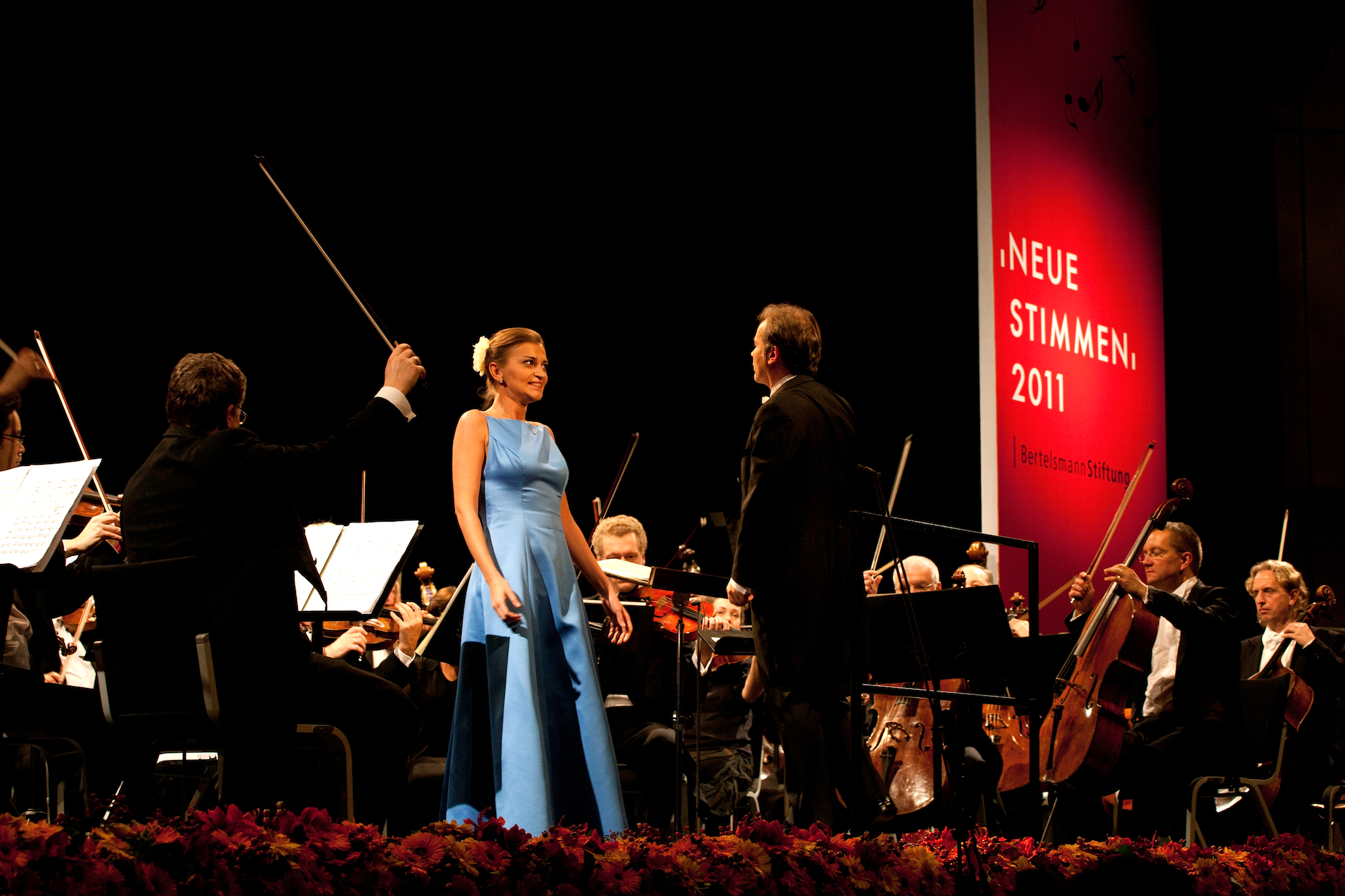
Maria Celeng during the final concert in 2011

In 1985, the Berlin Philharmonic under the direction of Herbert von Karajan gave a concert at the Gütersloh Community Center to commemorate the 150th anniversary of the founding of the Bertelsmann media group. During the event, Karajan spoke with Liz Mohn about the lack of programs for promoting new opera talent, saying that, compared to other countries, it was difficult to find suitable young singers in Germany. As a result, Mohn, who became a member of the Bertelsmann Stiftung's advisory board in 1986, organized an international singing competition. August Everding, general manager of the Bavarian State Theaters, played a key role by providing the specialized knowledge required to hold the event.

Organized together with the managers' committee of the Deutscher Bühnenverein, the association representing Germany's theaters and orchestras, the first competition took place at the Gütersloh Community Center in October 1987. In contrast to other events designed to promote new talent, the Neue Stimmen participants performed on a large stage in a concert hall, which they had to fill vocally. They were also accompanied by a symphony orchestra. In conjunction with the competition, the Bertelsmann Stiftung organized a symposium at which experts debated cultural policy issues. The symposium was also held in subsequent years.

Neue Stimmen was initially a European singing contest since only artists who trained in Europe qualified to participate. One noteworthy aspect is that singers from Eastern Europe competed right from the start. Beginning in the 1990s, artists from other countries also participated, for example from China, Israel, Japan, Korea and the United States. Neue Stimmen thus took on its current international form. The number of participants has grown steadily through the years. Approximately 1,500 applications are now submitted for each competition.

After events in 1987, 1988 and 1989, the organizers began holding competitions every two years. The first master class took place in 1997 and has been held ever since in the years between the competitions. It supports the development of particularly talented singers who have previously competed in Neue Stimmen. In 2012, a lied master class was added, which was also held in 2013 and 2014. The organizers want to use this event to maintain the lied as an art form.

Due to the impact of the global COVID-19 pandemic, the 2020 master class was held entirely digitally for the first time. Participants were given the opportunity to develop both their artistic and career skills in individual and group training sessions via video. In 2022, the New Voices will return to Gütersloh as a presence event. The final concert was accompanied by the Duisburg Philharmonic Orchestra conducted by Jonathan Darlington.

== Competition ==
The International Singing Competition New Voices has existed for over 30 years. In 2022, around 1400 applicants from over 60 nations took part. Among the requirements was that they were enrolled at a conservatory and had already rehearsed or performed roles. Singers were equally subject to an age limit of 31.

The jury first sifts through the best talents in preliminary selections. The process takes place worldwide under fair and professional conditions, for example in New York City or Cape Town. After the pre-selection, selected participants are invited to Gütersloh and accompanied by repetiteurs. There, the prize winners are determined in a final concert with an orchestra.

Since 2013, there has been a female and male first, second, and third place respectively, which allows for a fairer evaluation of the participants. Sometimes it can happen that two prize winners take the same place if they prove to be equal in front of the jury. There are also promotional, audience, and other special prizes.

The New Voices prize winners receive prize money depending on their placement. In 2022, it was 15,000, 10,000 and 5,000 euros. They are accompanied in the further course of their career, for example in accepting further engagements. Artistic directors and agents use the singing competition as a talent exchange to sign up promising singers.

== Jury ==
The New Voices jury consists of experienced practitioners from the world of opera and music. Currently, there are five women and four men under the chairmanship of Dominique Meyer.

From 1987 to 1997, August Everding headed the committee. From 1999 to 2001, René Kollo took his place. In 2003, 2005 and 2007, Gérard Mortier was at the helm. Patrons of the singing competition have been Richard von Weizsäcker (1993), Roman Herzog (1995), Rita Süssmuth (1997), Wolfgang Clement (1999) and Peter Ustinov (2001).

== Winners ==
1987

- First place: Nathalie Stutzmann (contralto)
- Second place: Tania Christova (lyric soprano)
- Third place: Andrzej Dobber (baritone)

1988

- First place: Izabela Labuda (soprano)
- Second place: Heike Theresa Terjung (lyric mezzo-soprano)
- Third place: Ingrid Kertesi (coloratura soprano)

1989

- First place: Vesselina Kasarova (mezzo-soprano)
- Second place: René Pape (bass)
- Third place: Bernard Lombardo (tenor)

1991

- First place: Sonia Zlatkova (soprano)
- Second place: Michael Volle (baritone)
- Third place: Annette Seiltgen (lyric mezzo-soprano)

1993

- First place: Marina Ivanova (coloratura soprano)
- Second place: Laura Polverelli (mezzo-soprano)
- Third place: Nicola Beller (lyric soprano)

1995

- First place: Gwyn Hughes Jones (tenor)
- Second place: Hanno Müller-Brachmann (bass baritone)
- Third place: Sami Luttinen (bass)

1997

- First place: Eteri Gvazava (soprano)
- Second place: Tigran Martirossian (bass)
- Third place: Soon-Won Kang (bass)

1999

- First place: Tina Schlenker (lyric coloratura soprano)
- Second place: Andrei Dounaev (tenor)
- Third place: Paul Gay (bass baritone)

2001

- First place: Burak Bilgili (bass)
- Second place: Woo-Kyung Kim (tenor)
- Third place: Anna Samuil (soprano)

2003

- First place: Franco Fagioli (countertenor)
- Second place: Maxim Mironov (tenor)
- Third place: Song-Hu Liu (lyric baritone)

2005

- First place: Maria Virginia Savastano (soprano)
- Second place: Alexey Kudrya (tenor)
- Third place: Anna Aglatova (soprano)

2007

- First place: Marina Rebeka (soprano)
- Second place: Fernando Javier Radó (bass)
- Third place: Diego Torre (tenor)

2009

- First place: Eunju Kwon (soprano)
- Second place: Kihwan Sim (bass baritone)
- Third place: JunHo You (tenor)

2011

- First place: Olga Bezsmertna (lyric soprano)
- Second place: Jongmin Park (bass)
- Third place: Xiahou Jinxu (tenor)

2013

- First place: Nicole Car (soprano), Nadine Sierra (soprano), Myong-Hyun Lee (tenor)
- Second place: Oleg Tibulco (bass)
- Third place: Kristina Mkhitaryan (soprano), Oleksandr Kyreiev (baritone)

2015

- First place: Elsa Dreisig (soprano), Anatoli Sivko (bass)
- Second place: Miriam Albano (mezzo-soprano), Darren Pene Pati (tenor)
- Third place: Bongiwe Nakani (mezzo-soprano), Lukhanyo Moyake (tenor)

2017

- First place: Svetlina Stoyanova (mezzo-soprano), Cho ChanHee (bass)
- Second place: Emily D'Angelo (mezzo-soprano), Johannes Kammler (baritone)
- Third place: Zlata Khershberg (mezzo-soprano), Mingjie Lei (tenor)

2019

- First place: Anna El-Khashem (soprano), Long Long (tenor)
- Second place: Natalia Tanasii (soprano), Bongani Justice Kubheka (baritone), Domen Križaj (baritone),
- Third place: Slávka Zámečníková (soprano)

2022

- First place: Francesca Pia Vitale (soprano), Carles Pachon (baritone)
- Second place: Eugénie Joneau (mezzo-soprano), Sakhiwe Mkosana (baritone)
- Third place: Yewon Han (soprano), Dumitru Mitu (tenor)

2024

- First place: Magdalena Lucjan (soprano), Alejandro Baliñas Vieites (bass)
- Second place: Anita Monserrat (mezzo-soprano), Trevor Haumschilt-Rocha (baritone)
- Third place: Teona Todua (soprano), Seray Pinar (mezzo-soprano), Finn Sagal (baritone)

2026

- First place: Arpi Sinanyan (soprano), Jiazhou Wang (baritone)
- Second place: Aigerim Altynbek (soprano), Irakli Pkhaladze (bass-baritone)
- Third place: Liere Wu (soprano), Rafael Rojas (tenor)
