= Bilgili =

Bilgili is a Turkish surname. Notable people with the surname include:

- Burak Bilgili (born 1974), Turkish opera singer
- Serdar Bilgili (born 1963), Turkish businessman
