= Tory (disambiguation) =

A Tory is a person who holds a political philosophy (Toryism) based on traditionalism and conservatism, originally from the Cavalier faction in the English Civil War.

It commonly refers to:

- Conservative Party (UK), a British political party
- Conservative Party of Canada, a Canadian political party
  - Conservative Party of Canada (1867–1942)
  - Progressive Conservative Party of Canada (1942–2003)
- Loyalist faction in the American Revolution
- Tories (British political party), a British political faction of the 17th to 19th centuries
- Tory Party (disambiguation), other political parties by that name

Tory may also refer to:

== Given name ==
=== Female ===
- Tory Marie Arnberger, American politician
- Tory Burch (born 1966), American fashion designer
- Tory Christman (born 1947), American critic
- Tory Dent (1958–2005), American poet
- Tory Fretz (born 1942), American tennis player
- Tory Gavito, American attorney
- Tory Lane (born 1982), American fetish model
- Tory Mussett (born 1978), Australian actress
- Tory Shepherd, Australian writer
- Tory Tunnell, American producer
- Tory Whanau (born 1983), New Zealand politician

=== Male ===
- Tory Baucum (born 1960), American Anglican priest
- Tory Belleci (born 1970), American TV personality
- Tory Blaylock (born 2006), American football player
- Tory Bruno (born 1961), CEO of the United Launch Alliance
- Tory Carter (born 1999), American football player
- Tory Cassis, Canadian singer
- Tory Collins (born 1982), American football player
- Tory Dickson (born 1987), Australian rules footballer
- Tory Dobrin, American artistic director
- Tory Epps (1967–2005), American football player
- Tory Harrison (born 1987), American footballer
- Tory Horton (born 2002), American football player
- Tory Humphrey (born 1983), American football player
- Tory James (born 1973), American football player
- Tory Kittles (born 1975), American actor
- Tory Lanez (born 1992), Canadian rapper
- Tory Nixon (born 1962), American football player
- Tory Nyhaug (born 1992), Olympic athlete
- Tory Pragassa (born 1996), Kenyan swimmer
- Tory Rocca (born 1973), American lawyer
- Tory Rushton (born 1979), Canadian politician
- Tory Taylor (born 1997), Australian American football player
- Tory Verdi, American basketball coach
- Tory Woodbury (born 1978), American football player

== Surname ==
- Geoffroy Tory (c.1480–1533), French humanist and engraver
- Henry Marshall Tory (1864–1967), Canadian university administrator
- James Cranswick Tory (1862–1944), Canadian lawyer and politician
- John A. Tory (1930–2011), Canadian lawyer and father of John H. Tory
- John Tory (born 1954), former Leader of the Ontario Progressive Conservative Party and Mayor of Toronto
- John S. D. Tory (1903–1965), Canadian lawyer and father of John A. Tory
- Melanie Tory, Canadian computer scientist

== Fictional characters ==
- Tory Boy, British TV show character
- Tory Nichols, Cobra Kai character

== Other uses ==
- Tory, from Tóraidhe, Irish Catholic soldiers in the mid-1600s who fought for the Confederation of Kilkenny
- Tory Creek (disambiguation)
- Tory Island, an island off the north-west coast of Ireland
- Tory, a ship of the New Zealand Company in 1839–1840
- Tory (HBC vessel), chartered by the Hudson's Bay Company from 1851–1852, see Hudson's Bay Company vessels
- Torys, a Canadian law firm and a member of the Bay Street Seven Sisters
- Tory, the code name of a nuclear reactor developed for Project Pluto

== See also ==
- Tori (disambiguation)
- Tori (name)
- Torey, given name and surname
- Torry (disambiguation)
- Torny Pedersen
