= Tory Creek =

Tory Creek may refer to:

- Tory Creek (Missouri), a stream in Missouri
- Tory Creek (Virginia), a stream in Virginia
