= Torhild =

Torhild, also written Thorhild, Thorild Torild, is a Norwegian feminine given name. Notable persons with that name include:

- Torhild Aarbergsbotten (born 1969), Norwegian politician
- Torhild Johnsen (born 1934), Norwegian politician
- Thorild Olsson (1886–1934), Swedish runner
- Torild Skard (born 1936), Norwegian psychologist
- Torild Skogsholm (born 1959), Norwegian politician
- Torhild Staahlen (born 1947), Norwegian opera singer
- Torild Wardenær (born 1951), Norwegian poet and playwright
- Thorhild Widvey (born 1956), Norwegian politician
- Thorild Wulff (1877–1917), Swedish botanist and polar explorer

== See also ==
- Tor (given name)
- Hild (disambiguation)
- Torill, a related name
- Thorhild County
