= Svetlina Stoyanova =

Bulgarian opera singer

- Светлина Стоянова
- Born: August 14, 1991 (age 35); Sofia, Bulgaria
- Education: University of Glasgow; Royal Conservatoire of Scotland
- Occupation: Operatic mezzo-soprano
- Awards: 2017 Neue Stimmen Competition
- Website: www.svetlinastoyanova.com

Svetlina Stoyanova is a Bulgarian operatic mezzo-soprano.

== Early life, education and personal life ==
Bulgarian Mezzo Soprano, Svetlina Stoyanova, was born in Sofia. She sang in the Children's Choir of the Bulgarian National Radio for 9 years. She trained in the UK, obtaining a bachelor's degree with honours and two master's degrees (Vocal Performance in 2016 and Opera in 2018) from the Royal Conservatoire of Scotland, under the tutelage of Clare Shearer.

== Career ==
In 2016 Ms Stoyanova was awarded 3rd Prize and highest ranked female singer in Le Grand Prix de l’Opera, and was subsequently invited to record with the Bulgarian National Radio Symphony Orchestra, and in 2017 she was awarded 1st prize in the Neue Stimmen International Singing Competition.

Following her competition success, Svetlina Stoyanova was invited by Opéra de Nice Côte d’Azur and Anthéa Theatre to perform Cherubino (Le nozze di Figaro) and the leading role of Rosina (Il barbiere di Siviglia) for the Bregenz Festival.

Svetlina Stoyanova joined the Vienna State Opera as a soloist for seasons 2018/19 and 2019/20. She made her house debut as Dryade (Ariadne auf Naxos) and also performed the roles of Rosina (Il barbiere di Siviglia), Cherubino (Le nozze di Figaro), Roßweisße (Die Walküre) and Lola (Cavalleria Rusticana), among others. She also appeared in guest performances of the Vienna State Opera as Cherubino at the Elbphilharmonie, Hamburg and as Zerlina (Don Giovanni) at the Tonhalle, Düsseldorf.

With Ensemble Matheus, led by Maestro Jean-Christophe Spinosi, Svetlina Stoyanova made her role debut as Isabella (L’Italiana in Algeri) which toured in France.

In the summer of 2020 Svetlina Stoyanova made her debut as Angelina, (La Cenerentola) with the New Generation Festival in Florence, Italy

Ms Stoyanova made her debuts in Bolshoi Theatre with the role of Rosina, Sofia National Opera as Angelina and Teatro Alla Scala as Cherubino

In addition to Opera, Ms Stoyanova is an experienced recitalist and has performed at the Musikverein, Vienna with pianist Stephen Hopkins; the Wigmore Hall, London and at the International Festival Sofia Music Weeks. She has sung in Matinées and concert performances for the Vienna State Opera. Svetlina Stoyanova has also performed in the Live Music Now series at Usher Hall, Edinburgh and for the Edinburgh Festival.

In November 2020, Ms Stoyanova made her debut at the Rossini Opera Festival as the mezzo-soprano soloist in Messa di Milano.

Her repertoire includes Angel in Elgar's Dream of Gerontius, Vivaldi's Gloria and Beethoven's Mass in C Major, which she has performed with the Orchestra of Scottish Opera and Mahler's Symphony No.4 with the Bulgarian National Radio Symphony Orchestra. Svetlina was honoured to sing Dvořák's Mass in D Major in the opening ceremony of the 2018 Bregenz Festival.

Svetlina Stoyanova was distinguished in Forbes Bulgaria in the ranking "30 under 30" for the year 2019 and in 2020 she received the prestigious "Certificate for contributing towards the popularization of Bulgarian culture around the world" from the Ministry of Culture of the Republic of Bulgaria.

Mrs Stoyanova's awards also include the 2019 Daniel Froschauer Award and The Silver Medal (Musician's Company Award). She is a former Samling Artist, and was a 2017/2018 Independent Opera Scholar and Fellow.

== Repertoire ==
Her operatic repertoire includes:

- Nerone – Agrippina – Alexander Gibson Opera Studio (2017)
- Cherubino – Le nozze di Figaro – Opera Nice Cote d'Azure (2018)
- Rosina – Il barbiere di Siviglia – Bregenzer Festspiele (2018)
- Dryad – Ariadne auf Naxos – Vienna State Opera (2018)
- Cherubino – Le nozze di Figaro – Vienna State Opera (2018)
- Tisbe– La Cenerentola – Vienna State Opera (2019)
- Lola– Cavalleria Rusticana – Vienna State Opera (2019)
- Roßweiße – Die Walküre – Vienna State Opera (2019)
- Rosina - Il barbiere di Siviglia - Vienna State Opera (2019)
- Isabella - L'italiana in Algeri - Ensemble Matheus (2019)
- Angelina - La Cenerentola - New Generation Festival (2020)
- Cherubino - Le nozze di Figaro - Teatro alla Scala
- Rosina - il Barbiere di Siviglia - Teatro alla Scala

Her concert and recital repertoire includes:

- Mass in C major - Scottish Opera
- Gloria - Scottish Opera
- Symphony No. 4 - "Bulgaria" Hall (2018)
- Lied.Bühne - Musikvereien, Vienna (2019)
