= Torrin (disambiguation) =

Torrin is a settlement on the island of Skye in Scotland.

Torrin may also refer to:

- Torrin Lawrence (1989-2014), American sprinter
- Torrin Tucker (born 1979), American former National Football League player
- Pedro Torrin, a governor of the Mexican Federal District in 1849 - see List of heads of government of the Mexican Federal District
- HMS Torrin, a fictional destroyer in the 1942 British film In Which We Serve

== See also ==
- Torin (disambiguation)
- Torran Rocks, a group of small islands and skerries in Scotland
