= Azohouè-Cada =

- Arrondissement and town
- Location in Benin
- Coordinates: 6°33′N 2°06′E
- Country: Benin
- Department: Atlantique Department
- Commune: Tori-Bossito

Population (2002)
  - Total: 6,457
- Time zone: UTC+1 (WAT)

Azohouè-Cada is a town and arrondissement in the Atlantique Department of southern Benin. It is an administrative division under the jurisdiction of the commune of Tori-Bossito. According to the population census conducted by the Institut National de la Statistique Benin on February 15, 2002, the arrondissement had a total population of 6,457.
