= Miriam Albano =

Italian opera singer (born 1991)

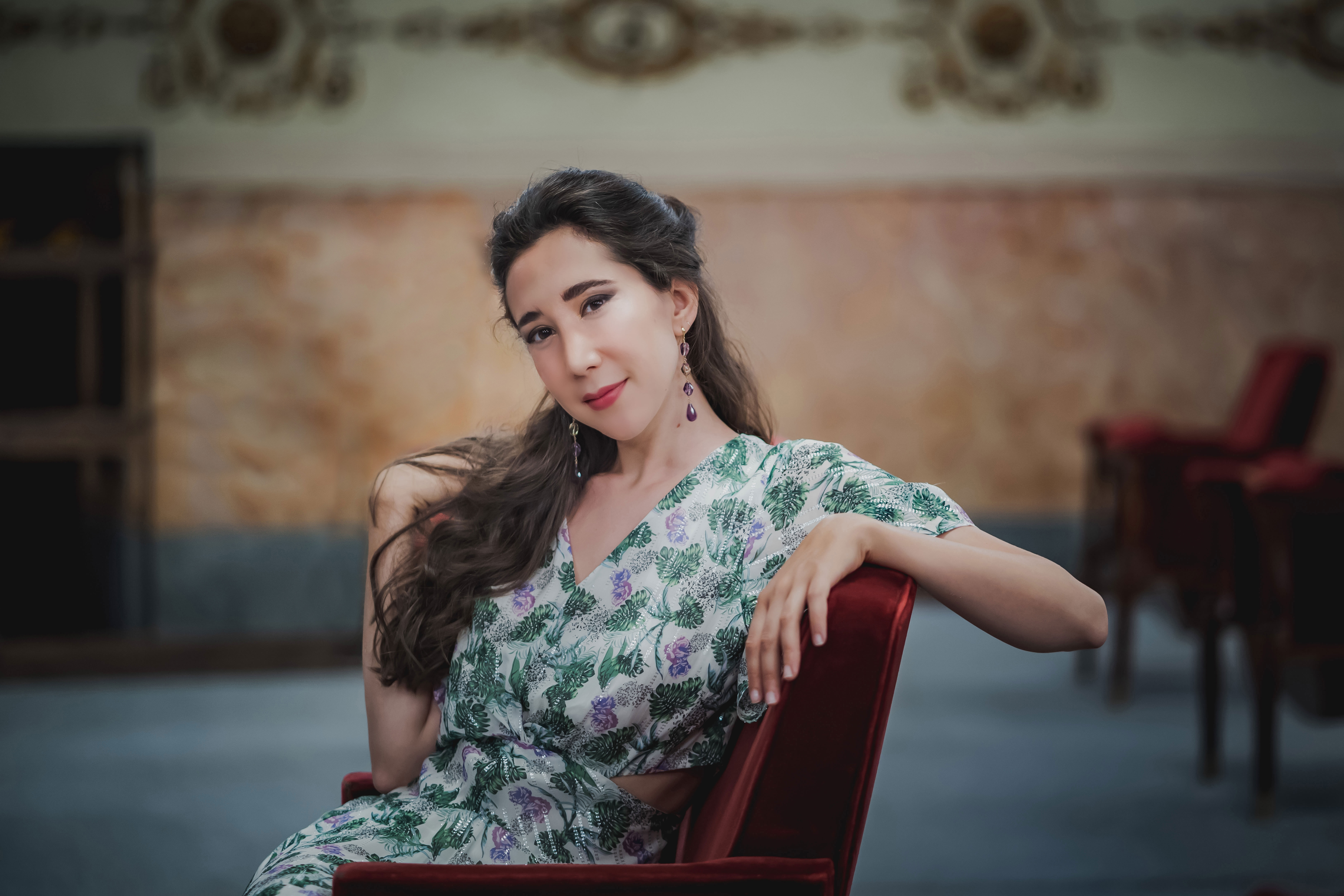
- Miriam Albano in 2021
- Born: 1991 (age 34–35); Venice, Italy
- Education: Conservatorio di Musica Benedetto Marcello; University of Music and Performing Arts Vienna
- Occupation: Operatic mezzo-soprano
- Awards: Neue Stimmen

Miriam Albano (born 1991) is an Italian opera singer (soprano). She has won numerous international competitions and was a soloist at the Vienna State Opera until 2019.

== Life and career ==
Born in Venice, Albano comes from a family of musicians. Her father is a violist and her mother a pianist, while her grandfather began his career as a prompter at La Scala in Milan and at La Fenice in Venice and was active as a conductor in numerous operas in the 1950s. She started her musical education at the age of seven at the Conservatorio di Musica Benedetto Marcello. After studying violin for 8 years, she completed her first vocal studies with Stella Silva and graduated with honors. In Vienna she took up further vocal studies with Claudia Visca at the University of Music and Performing Arts Vienna, graduating in 2017 in the Master programme Art Song and Oratorio with Robert Holl, Stephan Matthias Lademann, and Charles Spencer with highest honors and as winner of the mdw Appreciation Award (2018). She completed her musical education by participating in international master classes with KS Brigitte Fassbaender, Helmut Deutsch, Malcom Martineau, Anne Sofie von Otter and Ann Murray, among others. As a member of the 2016 Young Singers Project, she appeared at the Salzburg Festival in the opera for children The Fairy-Queen for Children in the leading role as Puck.

From 2016 to 2019, Miriam Albano was a soloist in the ensemble of the Vienna State Opera, where she debuted in February 2016 as Cherubino in Le Nozze di Figaro and as Annio in La Clemenza di Tito, conducted by Ádám Fischer. She also appeared as Cherubino at Vienna's Schlosstheater Schönbrunn, at the Teatro dell'Opera di Roma in a new production by Graham Vick, and at the Teatro del Maggio Musicale Fiorentino in Florence (season 2018-2019). Further, she debuted as Rosina in Laurent Pelly's production of Barbiere di Siviglia, conducted by Marc Minkowski at the Grand Théâtre de Bordeaux. At Deutsche Oper am Rhein, she made her debut as Angelina in La Cenerentola, produced by Jean-Pierre Ponnelle. In the 2019-2020 season, she debuted as Zerlina in Don Giovanni and Stephano in Romeo et Juliette, also at Deutsche Oper am Rhein.

In August 2020, she performed the role of Rosina in Barbiere di Seviglia for the Teatro dell'Opera di Roma at the Circus Maximus in Rome, conducted by Stefano Montanari. She performed the role of Melanto in Il ritorno di Ulisse in Patria in June 2021 at the Maggio Musicale in Florence conducted by Ottavio Dantone in a new production by Robert Carsen, recorded by Naxos Records.

In September 2021 she gave her debut at the Teatro Regio di Torino in Il Barbiere di Seviglia. This was followed by a concert performance of La Clemenza di Tito in November 2021, where she appeared in the role of Annio at the Teatro Nacional de São Carlos in Lisbon. In January 2022, she debuted the role of Autonoe from the opera Orfeo by Nicola Porpora at the Theater an der Wien and the Croatian National Theatre in Zagreb. In April 2022, she appeared as Despina in the opera Così fan tutte at the Gran Teatre del Liceu conducted by Marc Minkowski and staged by Ivan Alexander.

On the international concert stage, Miriam Albano's performances have included Les Nuits d'été by Berlioz, conducted by Leopold Hager at the Radio Kulturhaus in Vienna, and programme of arias with the ensemble Il Gene Barocco at the Gstaad New Years Music Festival. Furthermore, she appeared with the ensemble Les Musiciens du Louvre for the 68th Festival Internacional de Santander with Mozart's Great Mass in C minor, K427 conducted by Marc Minkowski. In November 2019, she performed at the Tonhalle Zurich under the baton of Alondra de la Parra.

== Awards ==
- Finalist BBC Cardiff Singer of the World (2017)
- Mozart Prize and European Opera Center Award from Tenor Viñas Contest (2016)
- 2nd Prize Neue Stimmen (2015)
- 1st Prize Ada-Sari Competition, Poland (2015)
- Prize of the Centre de Musique Baroque de Versailles and Newcomer Prize of the Pietro Antonio Cesti Vocal Competition for Baroque Opera at the Innsbruck Festival of Early Music (2014)
- 2nd Prize Ferruccio Tagliavini Competition (2014)
- Scholarship at the Bayreuth Festival (2018)
