= Domen Križaj =

Slovenian singer (born 1989)

- Born: 1989 (age 36–37); Kranj, Slovenia
- Occupation: Operatic baritone
- Organizations: Oper Frankfurt
- Awards: Neue Stimmen
- Website: www.domenkrizaj.com

Domen Križaj (born 1989) is a Slovenian operatic baritone who has performed internationally, based in Germany. As a member of the Oper Frankfurt, he has appeared in major roles including Mozart's Papageno, Albert in Massenet's Werther, and the Count in Capriccio by Richard Strauss.

== Life and career ==
Born in Kranj, Križaj took voice lessons from age 14, and enjoyed opera already as a youth. He studied medicine in Ljubljana, and from 2012 also sang with Matjaž Robavs at the academy. In 2013, he took part in the Young Singers Project of the Salzburg Festival. He was a member of the studio of the Theater Basel from 2017 to 2019, where he appeared in the title role of Ullmann's Der Kaiser von Atlantis and as Sharpless in Puccini's Madama Butterfly. He became a member of the ensemble in the 2019/20 season, and appeared as Marcello in Puccini's La Bohème. He was awarded second prize in the Neue Stimmen competition in 2019.

In 2020, he performed at the Oper Frankfurt in a recital and as Albert in Massenet's Werther, and then became a member of the ensemble there. A critic wrote that he presented the most beautiful and most cultivated voice of the night ("schönste und kultivierteste Stimme des Abends"), and described it: "Striking and wonderfully timbred, the dark baritone flowed in splendid colour nuances and expressive tonal balance" ("Markant, herrlich timbriert strömte der dunkle Bariton in prächtigen Farbnuancen und ausdrucksstarker Klangbalance"). He appeared as Albert also at the Slowenian National Opera in Rijeka. He performed at the Tiroler Festspiele in Erl in 2021 as both the Heerrufer in Wagner's Lohengrin and the Rabbi David in Mascagni's L'amico Fritz. In the following season he appeared there in the title role of Chausson's König Arthus and was the soloist in Ein Deutsches Requiem by Brahms. Other roles in Frankfurt have included Papageno in Mozart's Die Zauberflöte and the Count in Capriccio by Richard Strauss. When he appeared as Sharpless alongside Heather Engebretson as Madama Butterfly, a reviewer noted his empathy and "wonderfully warm" voice, described by Jan Brachmann from the FAZ as heartwarming (Herzenswärme).
