= Torry Burn =

Torry Burn may refer to:

- Torry Burn, Huntly, Aberdeenshire, Scotland
- Torry Burn, burn in Cairneyhill, Fife, Scotland
- Torryburn, village and parish in Fife, Scotland
- Torryburn, New South Wales, Australia

== See also ==
- Torry Burn (disambiguation)
