= Torikeskus =

Torikeskus (Finnish for "Marketplace centre") can refer to:

- Torikeskus (Jyväskylä shopping centre), a shopping centre in Jyväskylä, Finland
- Torikeskus (Seinäjoki shopping centre), a shopping centre in Seinäjoki, Finland
