= Torishima =

Torishima, Tori-shima or Tori Shima, is a Japanese toponym or personal surname. Most versions of the name have the meaning Bird Island (鳥島 /とりしま), with some exceptions.

== Places ==
- Tori-shima (Izu Islands) or Izu Torishima, the island of the Izu Islands, Hachijō Subprefecture, Tokyo
- Minami-Tori-shima (South Bird Island) or Marcus Island, Ogasawara, Tokyo, the easternmost point of Japan
- Okinotorishima (Remote Bird Island), Ogasawara, Tokyo, the southernmost point of Japan
- Kume Torishima or Okinawa Torishima, Kumejima, Okinawa
- Iōtorishima (Sulfur Bird Island), Kumejima, Okinawa; major source of sulfur for the Ryukyu Kingdom
- Nakanotorishima (Center Bird Island) or Ganges Island, the phantom island which was believed to exist in the early 20th century

== People ==
- Kazuhiko Torishima, editor and producer, best known for Weekly Shōnen Jump magazine and various manga titles
- Dempow Torishima, science fiction author and illustrator, winner of the 2011 Sogen SF Short Story Prize for his story "Sisyphean (皆勤の徒 Kaikin no To)"
