= Torin =

Torin may refer to:

- Torin (given name), a list of people and fictional characters
- Joseph Torin (1849–1907), French actor, known for his comic roles
- Symphony Sid Torin (1909–1984), jazz disc jockey born Sidney Tarnopol
- A version of the military side cap
- Torin, a frazione (subdivision) of the comune of Pontey, Italy

== See also ==
- Tōrin-in, a sub-temple in Kyoto, Japan
- Tōrin-in (Naruto), a temple in Naruto, Japan
- Torrin (disambiguation)
