= Torry Burn, Huntly =

Stream in Aberdeenshire, Scotland

Coordinates: 57.440°N 2.895°W

Torry Burn is a burn which marks the boundary of the parish of Huntly, Aberdeenshire, Scotland.
