= Tore =

Tore may refer to:

== Places ==
- Tõre, Estonia, a village
- Tore, Scotland, a village
- Töre, Sweden, a locality
- Töre River, Sweden
- Tore (volcano), Papua New Guinea

== People ==
- Tore (given name), a Scandinavian given name
- Elihan Tore (1885–1976), President of the Second East Turkistan Republic
- Gökhan Töre (born 1992), Turkish footballer

== Other uses ==
- Tore Station, a railway station in Latvia
- Tore (TV series), a 2023 Swedish Netflix series
- Töre (dynasty), a Kazakh dynasty and later a clan
