= Burak Bilgili =

Turkish operatic bass-baritone

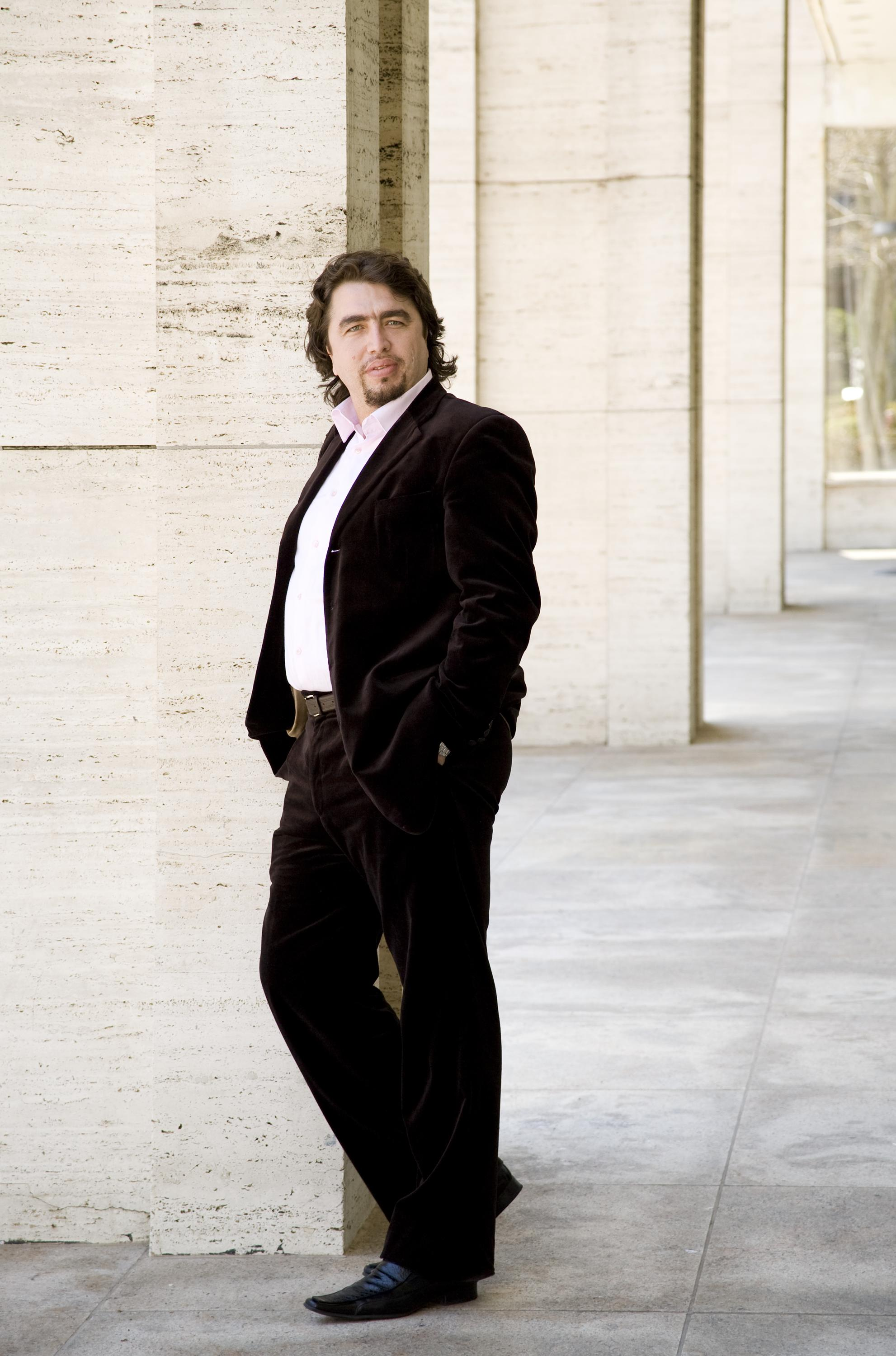
Burak Bilgili

Burak Bilgili is a Turkish operatic bass-baritone who was born in Akşehir, a town in the Konya Province of Turkey. He has sung in leading opera houses in the United States and Europe.

Initially, he studied at Mimar Sinan University in Istanbul and later with San Francisco Opera's Merola Opera Program, and at the Academy of Vocal Arts in Philadelphia from which he graduated in 2004. He also studied in Italy with Bonaldo Giaotti and Katia Ricciarelli at the Accademia Lirica Internazionale "Katia Ricciarelli" in Parma. In 2003, he became Turkey's first ever representative at the BBC Cardiff Singer of the World competition.

== Singing career ==
His stage debut came in 1998 when he sang Don Geronio in Rossini's Il turco in Italia with the Turkish State Opera in Istanbul. He also sang with the company the following year as Abimelech in Camille Saint-Saëns Samson and Delilah. In 2002 while still a student at the Academy of Vocal Arts, he made his international debut as Duke Alfonso in Donizetti's Lucrezia Borgia at La Scala, followed by a series of other house debuts before he graduated. These included his US debut at the Baltimore Opera as Sparafucile in Verdi's Rigoletto in 2002; appearances at both the Vancouver Opera and Pittsburgh Opera as Don Basilio in Rossini's The Barber of Seville in 2003; and performances as Raimondo in Donizetti's Lucia di Lammermoor both at the Palm Beach Opera and at the Teatro dell'Opera di Roma in 2003.

Bilgili made his Metropolitan Opera debut on 7 May 2004, when he sang Leporello without either a "full-stage or orchestra rehearsal" in the final performance of Don Giovanni that season. When he took his solo bow at the end of the performance, the audience roared in appreciation. He returned to the company in 2009 as Ferrando in Il trovatore.

Between 2005 and 2006 he added several new roles to his repertoire including Timur in Turandot at the Gran Teatre del Liceu in Barcelona and New York City Opera, both in 2005; Mefistopheles in Faust for Virginia Opera in 2005; Banquo in Macbeth, first sung with the Canadian Opera Company in 2005, followed by performances of the role at Vancouver Opera and Seattle Opera in 2006; and Escamillo in Carmen at Den Norske Opera in Oslo and the Savonlinna Opera Festival, both in 2006.

More role debuts followed in 2007 - 2008, including several house debuts. These included Padre Guardiano in La forza del destino at the Maggio Musicale Fiorentino in 2007; Ramfis in Aida with Cincinnati Opera in 2007; Nourabad in The Pearl Fishers for Florida Grand Opera in 2008; and Giorgio in I puritani at the Teatro Massimo di Palermo in 2008.

== Prizes ==
- First Prize – Neue Stimmen (2001)
- First prize – the Hans Gabor Belvedere Singing Competition (2002)
- First Prize – Concurso Internacional de Canto Alfredo Kraus (2002)
- Winner - 3rd Concert of the BBC Cardiff Singer of the World (2003)
- Gerda Lissner Foundation Winner (2005)
- 2nd Place - Mirjam Helin Competition-Helsinki, Finland (2004)
- 2nd Place - Jeunesses Musicales Montreal International Competition - Canada (2002)
- 1st Place - Mario Lanza Opera Competition - (2001)
- 1st Place - J.Parkinson Italian Opera Competition - (2001)
- 2nd Place - Licia Albanese- Puccini Foundation International Voice Competition (2001)
- Winner Loren Zachary Opera Competition - (2001)
- 1st Place - Giargiari Bel Canto Competition - (2000)
- First Prize Siemens Art Award Opera Competition (1998)
