= Tori (name) =

- Gender: Usually female, sometimes male

Origin
- Origin: Latin or Japanese

Other names
- Related names: Tory

Tori is primarily a given name. It is more common among women, and it is often a hypocorism of Victoria (Latin for "victory"). The Japanese meaning of the name is "bird", and may be used for men.

Notable people with the name include:

== Given name ==
- Tori Alamaze (born 1977), American singer
- Tori Allen-Martin (born 1986), British actress
- Tori Amos (born 1963), American singer-songwriter
- Tori Anderson (born 1988), Canadian actress
- Tori Anthony (born 1989), American pole vaulter
- Tori Black (born 1988), American pornographic film actress
- Tori Bowie (1990–2023), American sprinter and long jumper
- Tori Butler-Hart, English actress, writer and producer
- Tori DellaPeruta (born 2004), Italian and American soccer player
- Tori Dilfer (born 1999), American volleyball player
- Tori Dunlap, American investor, feminist, and social media personality
- Tori Fixx, American rapper
- Tori Foster (born 1982), Canadian artist and filmmaker
- Tori Franklin (born 1992), American triple jumper
- Tori Freestone, British jazz musician
- Tori Geib (1986–2021), American chef and patient advocate
- Tori Groves-Little (born 2000), Australian rules footballer
- Tori Gurley (born 1987), American gridiron football player
- Tori Hall (born 1986), American beauty pageant contestant and TV personality
- Tori Hansen (born 2001), American soccer player
- Tori Haring-Smith, American academic administrator
- Tori Huster (born 1989), American soccer player
- Tori James (born 1981), Welsh mountain climber
- Tori Jankoska (born 1994), American basketball player
- Tori Kelly (born 1992), American singer-songwriter
- Tori Kewish (born 1997), Australian darts player
- Tori Koana (born 1995), Japanese curler
- Tori Kropp, American writer
- Tori Lacey (born 1973), British weather forecaster
- Tori Lyons, Welsh actress
- Tori Matsuzaka (born 1988), Japanese actor and model
- Tori Murden (born 1963), American athlete, adventurer, chaplain, lawyer, and university president
- Tori Nelson (born 1976), American boxer
- Tori Nonaka (born 1995), American sport shooter
- Tori Paul (born 2002), Trinidad and Tobago footballer
- Tori Peeters (born 1994), New Zealand javelin thrower
- Tori Pena (born 1987), Irish-American pole vaulter
- Tori Penso (born 1986), American soccer referee
- Tori Polk (born 1983), American long jumper
- Tori Praver (born 1987), American model
- Tori Reid (1912–2003), New Zealand rugby union player
- Tori Sampson, American dramatist and journalist
- Tori Sparks (born 1983), American singer-songwriter
- Tori Spelling (born 1973), American actress
- Tori Sullivan (born 1996), American ice hockey player
- Tori (wrestler) (born 1964), American professional wrestler
- Tori Trees (born 1965), American swimmer
- Tori Tsui, Hong Kong climate justice activist
- Tori Tumeth (born 2001), Australian soccer player
- Tori West (born 1995), Australian athlete

== Surname ==
- Anselmo Valencia Tori (1921–1998), Native American leader
- Elizabeth Tori (1936–2024), American politician
- Miki Tori (born 1958), Japanese manga artist
- Toscane Tori (born 2004), French fencer

== Pen name ==
- Tori Carrington, pen name of the husband–wife writing team of Tony Karayianni and Lori Schlachter Karayianni

== Fictional characters ==
- Tori Hanson, character from Power Rangers Ninja Storm, played by Sally Martin
- Tori Scott, character from American TV series Saved by the Bell, played by Leanna Creel
- Tori Vega, character from Victorious, played by Victoria Justice
- Princess Tori, character from Barbie: the Princess and the Popstar, voiced by Kelly Sheridan
- Tori Himemiya (姫宮 桃李), a character from Ensemble Stars!, voiced by Ayumu Murase in Japanese and Mikaela Krantz in English

== See also ==
- Tori (disambiguation)
- Torey (name), given name and surname
