= Torke (disambiguation) =

The term Torke may refer to:

== Place ==
- Torke, a village in India celebrated for its salt production

== Surname ==
- Michael Torke (1961 - ), American composer
