= Diego Torre =

Mexican and Australian opera singer (born 1979)

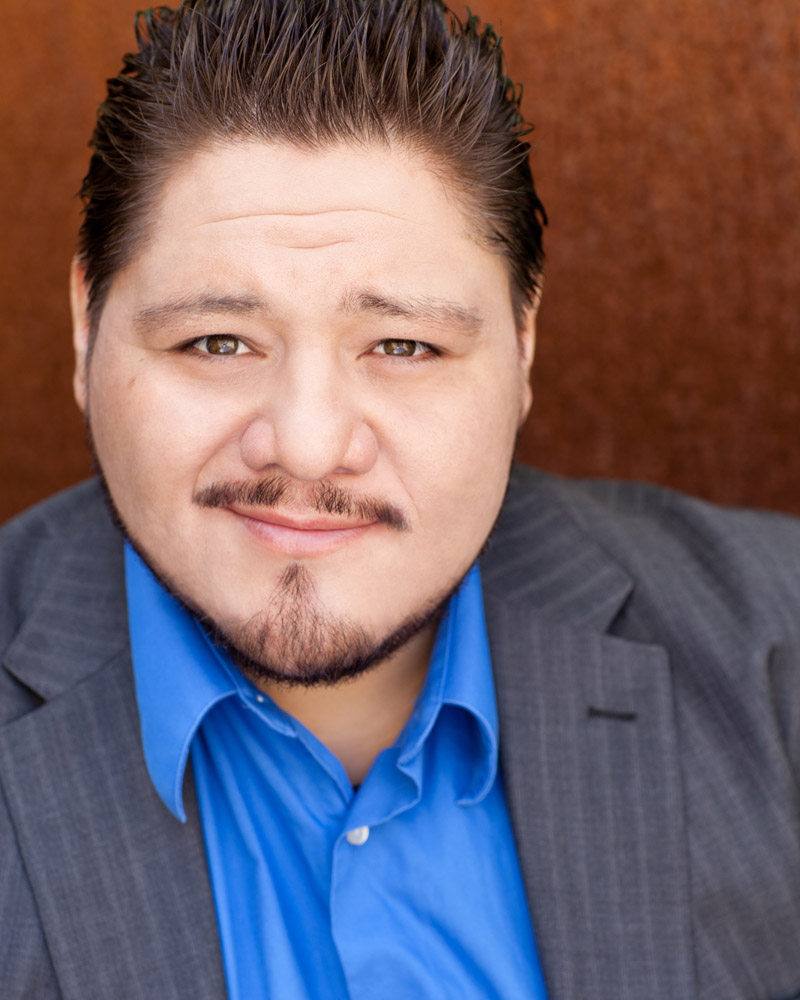
- Born: Diego Antonio Torre Villegas; November 24, 1979 (age 46); Mexico City
- Occupation: Operatic tenor
- Years active: 2008–present
- Organizations: Sydney Opera House
- Website: www.diegotorre.com

Diego Antonio Torre Villegas (Mexico City, November 24, 1979) is a Mexican and Australian opera singer. He is a resident singer in the Sydney Opera House (Australia).

== Early life ==
Born in Vicente Guerrero colony at Iztapalapa, Torre studied at the Academia Militarizada México where he sang for the professors and the cloister at meals and events. He also belonged to La Estudiantina at the "La Salle del Pedregal" High School.

== Training period ==
Torre studied at the School of Music of the National Autonomous University of Mexico. He applied by chance when he went with a friend to pick up some scores and saw that the application office was open. He studied Canto under the Chair of Maestro Rufino Montero. At age 20, he debuted with the Compañía Nacional de Ópera in the Palacio de Bellas Artes while performing as Gastone in La Traviata and chose opera as a career from then on.

In 2004 and 2005, Torre trained through a summer program with the Ezio Pinza Council for American Singers of Opera (EPCASO), while also receiving training in Italy with teachers Claudia Pinza, Enza Ferrari, Maurizio Arena and Maria Chiara. In 2005 he received the support of the International Society of Mexican Art Values (SIVAM), and was able to travel to Los Angeles to audition at Plácido Domingo Young Singers Program. He auditioned with a solo accompanied by piano, was accepted, and moved to Los Angeles in 2007. On 6 December 2008, he made his international debut at the Los Angeles Opera as Don Jose in Bizet's Carmen.

== Operatic career ==
In 2007, at age 27, Torre won third place in the Neue Stimmen opera competition organized by the Bertelsmann Foundation in Gütersloh, Germany. He sang an aria from Un Ballo in Maschera by Giuseppe Verdi.

In 2009, Torre represented Rodolfo in La bohème at Filene Center of Wolf Trap (Virginia). The atmosphere in the internet cafes of the 21st century, with laptops and digital sets, gathered musicians from the National Symphony Orchestra, choirs of the Choral Arts Society and the Choir of Children of the Choral Society of Alexandria. The Washington Times review was: “As Rodolfo, tenor Diego Torre was simply smashing. Built like a beer-loving construction worker you’d see at a local watering hole, Mr. Torre hardly seemed a conventional romantic lead. Yet most guys in the audience could easily identify with this everyman. His passion was real, his heartbreak was immense, and his commanding, gloriously sculpted instrument makes him an up-and-coming talent to be watched.”

During the 2009/2010 season he performed at the Metropolitan Opera House in New York, playing the Messenger in Aida and Federico in Stiffelio. And he continued his work as a tenor in other opera houses. He was the fisherman Masaniello in La muette de Portici, Edgardo in Lucia di Lammermoor m, and was the cover of Plácido Domingo in the main role of Il Postino in Los Angeles Opera.

While Torre was in New York, Lyndon Terracini, the Director of the Australian Opera, offered him a 22 performance run of La Bohème at the Australian Opera. He accepted a position as a Resident Tenor there. On Australia Day 2016 (26 Jan), he sang the national anthem to the Prime Minister, Malcolm Turnbull, during the official memorial ceremony. He was one of 27 people from 13 countries becoming an Australian citizen.

Among the experts Diego Torre is considered to have an operatic voice fitted with a solid technique, which allows him to range from a tenore lirico repertoire to a tenore lirico spinto, one from Donizetti to Verdi, from Puccini to Mascagni, from Leoncavallo to Zemlinsky.

In 2012 he recorded Puccini's La bohème, with the Norwegian National Opera Orchestra conducted by Eivind Gullberg Jensen. This album is considered by The New York Times as one of the best albums of classical music.

== Classical Repertoire ==
Role	Opera	Composer
Pinkerton	Madama Butterfly	Giacomo Puccini
Rodolfo	La bohème	Giacomo Puccini
Radames	Aida	Giuseppe Verdi
Edgardo	Lucia di Lammermoor	Gaetano Donizetti
Cavaradossi	Tosca	Giacomo Puccini
Tenor	Requiem	Giuseppe Verdi
Turiddu	Cavalleria Rusticana	Pietro Mascagni
Canio	Pagliacci	Ruggero Leoncavallo
Gabrielle Adorno	Simon Boccanegra	Giuseppe Verdi
Rodolfo	Luisa Miller	Giuseppe Verdi
Don Carlos	Don Carlos	Giuseppe Verdi
Duque de Mantua	Rigoletto	Giuseppe Verdi
Gustavus	Un ballo in maschera	Giuseppe Verdi
Corrado	Il Corsaro	Giuseppe Verdi
Calaf	Turandot	Giacomo Puccini
Manrico	Il Trovatore	Giuseppe Verdi
Don José	Carmen	Georges Bizet
Masaniello	La muette de Portici	Daniel-François Auber
Foresto	Attila	Giuseppe Verdi
Bacchus	Ariadne auf Naxos	Richard Strauss

He has performed in the main Opera theaters of the world and with the main companies: Boston Lyric Opera, Florida Grand Opera, Metropolitan Opera, San Francisco Opera, Los Angeles Opera and Dorothy Chandler Pavilion, all of them in the United States; Sydney Opera House, Melbourne Arts Center, and Queensland Performing Arts Center in Australia; Palacio de Bellas Artes and Peon Cotreras Theater in Mexico; Savonlinna Opera Festival, in Finland; Karlsruhe Staatstheater, Dessau Staatstheater, Darmstadt Staatstheater and Saarbrücken Staatstheater, in Germany; Teatro Comunale di Bologna, Teatro Carlo Felice Genova and Teatro Regio di Torino in Italy; The Norwegian Opera & Ballet in Norway, Grand-Théâtre de Genève in Geneva and the Xi'an Symphony Orchestra in China.

== Awards ==
- 2003 Nicolás Urcelay National Singing Competition in Mérida, Yucatán
- 2005 XXIII Carlo Morelli National Singing Competition
- 2005 Instrumenta Award
- 2005 Special FONCA Award
- 2005 Bellas Artes Award
- 2007 XX Neue Stimmen Opera Competition (New Voices), 3rd Prize, Bertelsmann Foundation, Germany
