= Tore Station =

Railway station in Latvia

Tore

General information
- Coordinates: 56°31′51.62″N 21°15′14.98″E
Location

Tore Station is a railway station on the Jelgava – Liepāja Railway.
