= Torin (given name) =

Torin is a masculine given name which may refer to:

People:

- Torin Dorn (born 1968), American former National Football League player
- Torin Ferguson (born 1985), football goalkeeper from the Bahamas
- Torin Francis (born 1983), American professional basketball player
- Torin Koos (born 1980), American cross country skier
- Torin Myhill (born 1995), Welsh rugby union player
- Torin Thatcher (1905–1981), British actor
- Torin Yater-Wallace (born 1995), American freestyle skier

Fictional characters:

- Torin Mac Quillon, protagonist of the American comic book series Starslayer
- Torin, in the Japanese television series Zyuden Sentai Kyoryuger

== See also ==
- Torin (disambiguation)
- Tonin (name)
- Torrin Lawrence (1989-2014), American sprinter
- Torrin Tucker (born 1979), American former National Football League player
