= Torry Hill =

Country estate in Kent, England

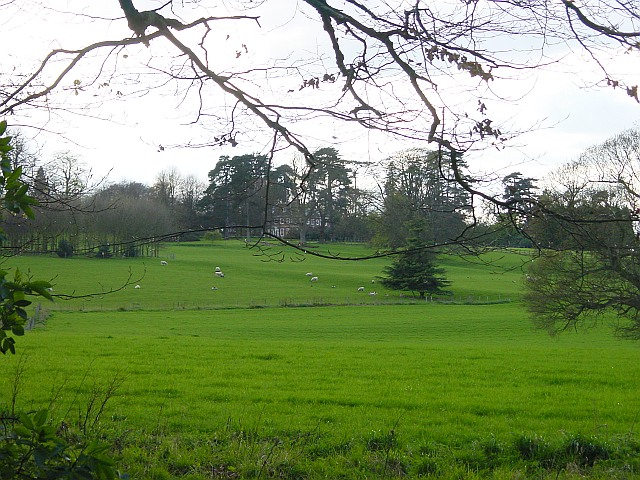
Torry Hill parkland with the main house in the distance

Torry Hill, in Kent, England, is the family estate of the Leigh-Pemberton (formerly Pemberton Leigh) line. It is on the boundary of Frinsted and Milstead, approximately 3 km due southwest of Kingsdown hamlet.

The estate typifies a style of environmental management encouraged by downland landed gentry. What was once simple enclosed farmland has been variously sculpted into ornamental parkland through a process of tree thinning, augmentation and managed grazing. The estate property includes eccentric country house follies such as a private cricket ground (which has been in use since the mid-19th century) and, alongside Linton Park, Wallsworth Hall, Downham Hall, High Elms (Orpington), Heythrop Park and Glyndebourne Manor, one of the few private Eton Fives courts in the world. The association of the estate with leisure pursuits, particularly of the upper classes, is evident from at least the mid-19th century as illustrated by one report in a local newspaper:

"Royal East Kent Mounted Rifles - last Saturday the C troop of the regiment met at Torry Hill where they were entertained at luncheon by their captain, Lofus Leigh Pemberton Esq. A booth was erected in the park for that purpose and the benches were supplied by Mr Sage of the Chequers Inn, Doddington. The real purpose of the meet was for the members of the troop to compete in sword exercises for prizes...The prize cup was filled and drank out of to the health of the Queen by the competitors and company. A scratch match of cricket was afterwards played." (East Kent Gazette, 4 September 1869)

In addition the Torry Hill Miniature Railway was constructed on the estate in the 1930s following earlier carriage drive routes. Although it is no longer in regular operation, a number of features of this railway remain including sections of track, bridges and turntables and parts of the railway are still opened on occasions. In common with other big houses on the Kent Downs, Torry Hill possesses an icehouse, used in the 19th century to provide cold storage for provisions. Other notable features include a well-preserved mounting block alongside a quiet crossroads.

Originally built in 1925, the main house was rebuilt to a Georgian design in the 1960s and only a Victorian gate-house remains on the estate. Before his death on 24 November 2013, it was the home to Robin Leigh-Pemberton, Baron Kingsdown.

The estate parkland has in recent years been used for other diverse pursuits such as a campsite for the local District Scout organisations and a grasstrack motorcycle racing venue.

The rose garden and grounds are opened to the public on limited dates throughout the summer.

== Estate management ==
The current owners are conscious of responsible estate management. It is a privately owned working farm supporting grazing livestock, cherry orchards, and arable farming of crops like wheat. The Torry Hill cherry orchards in particular produce around 15 different varieties of cherry, a former staple product of the Kent countryside. Measures have been put in place to increase the density of gamebirds such as the partridge, woodcock and pheasant. Predators such as squirrels, stoats, weasels, foxes, rats and corvids, are kept low.

The estate participates in conservation and countryside stewardship schemes, including the establishment of conservation strips around arable fields, creating ‘beetle banks’ (raised ridges in fields to encourage aphid-consuming carabids) and leaving crops to overwinter in fields that benefit passerines.
