= Torill Fonn =

Swedish ultramarathon runner from Skövde

Personal information
- Full name: Torill Beate Kjersti Fonn
- Born: November 1, 1967 (age 58)

Sport
- Country: Sweden
- Sport: ultramarathon

Torill Fonn (born 1 November 1967) is a Swedish ultramarathon runner from Skövde. Fonn holds the current women's Nordic record for the 48-hour run. (376.939 kilometres (234.219 miles), Skövde SWE, Aug 2015).

== Competition record ==
=== International competitions ===
Year	Competition	Venue	Position	Event	Notes
Representing Sweden
2015	European Championships	Turin, Italy	1st	24-hour run (Team)	228.327 km (Team average)

=== Non-championship races ===
2015

- 1st place in 48-hour run Sweden (376.939 km)
- 2nd place in 24-hour run Finland (216.456 km)

2014

- 1st place in 48-hour run Sweden (374.999 km)
- 2nd place in 24-hour run Finland (192.421 km)

2013

- 2nd place in 48-hour run Sweden (312.058 km)
- 1st place in 48-hour run Australia (341.559 km)

2011

- 1st place in 48-hour run Sweden (312.715 km)
- 1st place in 12-hour run Norway (123.378 km)

== Personal life ==
Fonn lives in Skövde in Sweden. She took up running as a hobby in 1995 and ran her first ultramarathon in 2004.
