= CaDA Bricks =

Chinese toy company

- Founded: April 2016; 10 years ago in China
- Founder: Double Eagle Group
- Headquarters: China
- Products: Toys
- Parent: Double Eagle Company
- Website: decadastore.com/pages/about-us

CaDA, or CaDA Bricks, is a Chinese toy company which was founded in 2016 as a subdivision of the larger Double Eagle Group company. CaDA is a producer of Lego-compatible building block sets. They have also collaborated with other IPs to create themed sets.

== History ==
CaDA Bricks was established in 2016 by the Double Eagle Group, a Chinese toy company. Originally based in China, CaDA is now expanding its presence into the worldwide market; its current focus being Germany. In 2020 and 2022, CaDA launched two new toylines; namely the CaDA Bricks Master and CaDA Elements toylines.

== Toylines ==
=== CaDA Technic ===
CaDA Technic is designed in a similar format to Lego Technic toys. According to CaDA, the Technic line is their most well-known toyline. Within the Technic line is the Super Car series, which are supercars and sports cars assembled in the Lego Technic style.

=== CaDA Bricks Master ===
CaDA Bricks Master is a line of brick construction sets launched in 2020. The sets are based on original designs by like-minded hobbyists.

=== CaDA Elements ===
First launched in 2022.

== Collaborations ==
CaDA Bricks has collaborated with other IP properties, such as the manga series Initial D. CaDA has also produced officially licensed car brick construction sets, in collaboration with leading car brands. These include Citroen, Hummer and also Suzuki.
