= Tori-Cada =

Coordinates: 6°35′N 2°12′E

- Arrondissement and town
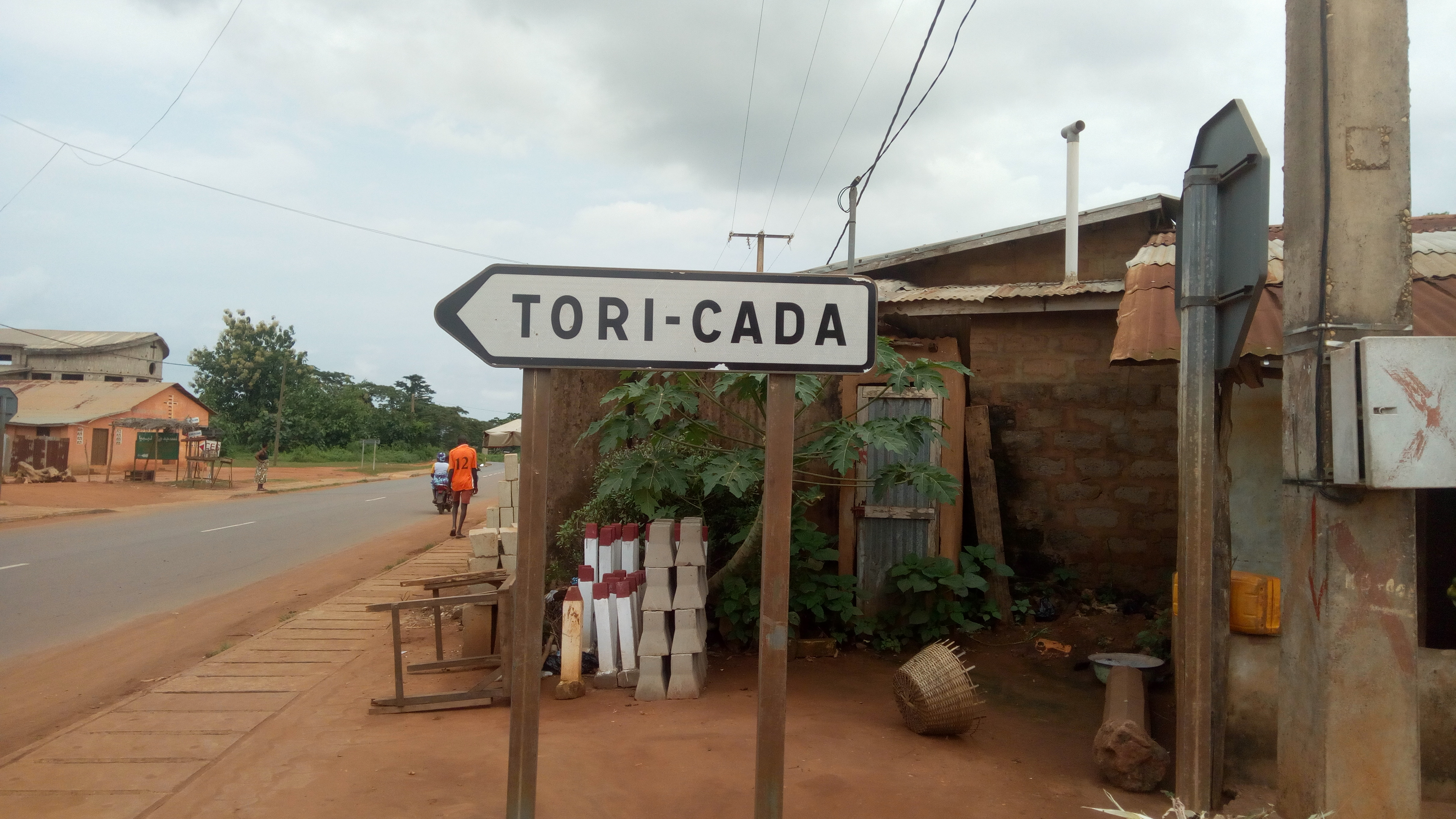
- A sign pointing to Tori-Cada
- Interactive map of Tori-Cada
- Country: Benin
- Department: Atlantique Department
- Commune: Tori-Bossito

Population (2002)
  - Total: 11,952
- Time zone: UTC+1 (WAT)

Tori-Cada is a town and arrondissement in the Atlantique Department of southern Benin. It is an administrative division under the jurisdiction of the commune of Tori-Bossito. According to the population census conducted by the Institut National de la Statistique Benin on February 15, 2002, the arrondissement had a total population of 11,952.
