= Tory Creek (Virginia) =

- Location within Virginia Location within the United States

Physical characteristics
- Source
  - coordinates: 36.7276364°N 80.4603434°W
- Mouth
  - coordinates: 36.7504143°N 80.5022910°W

Tory Creek is a stream in Carroll and Floyd counties, Virginia, in the United States.

Tories who camped along Tory Creek after the Revolutionary War caused the name to be selected.

== See also ==
- List of rivers of Virginia
