= Torry Hill Railway =

Miniature railway in Kent, England

Coordinates: 51.277665°N 0.742133°E

Torry Hill Miniature Railway
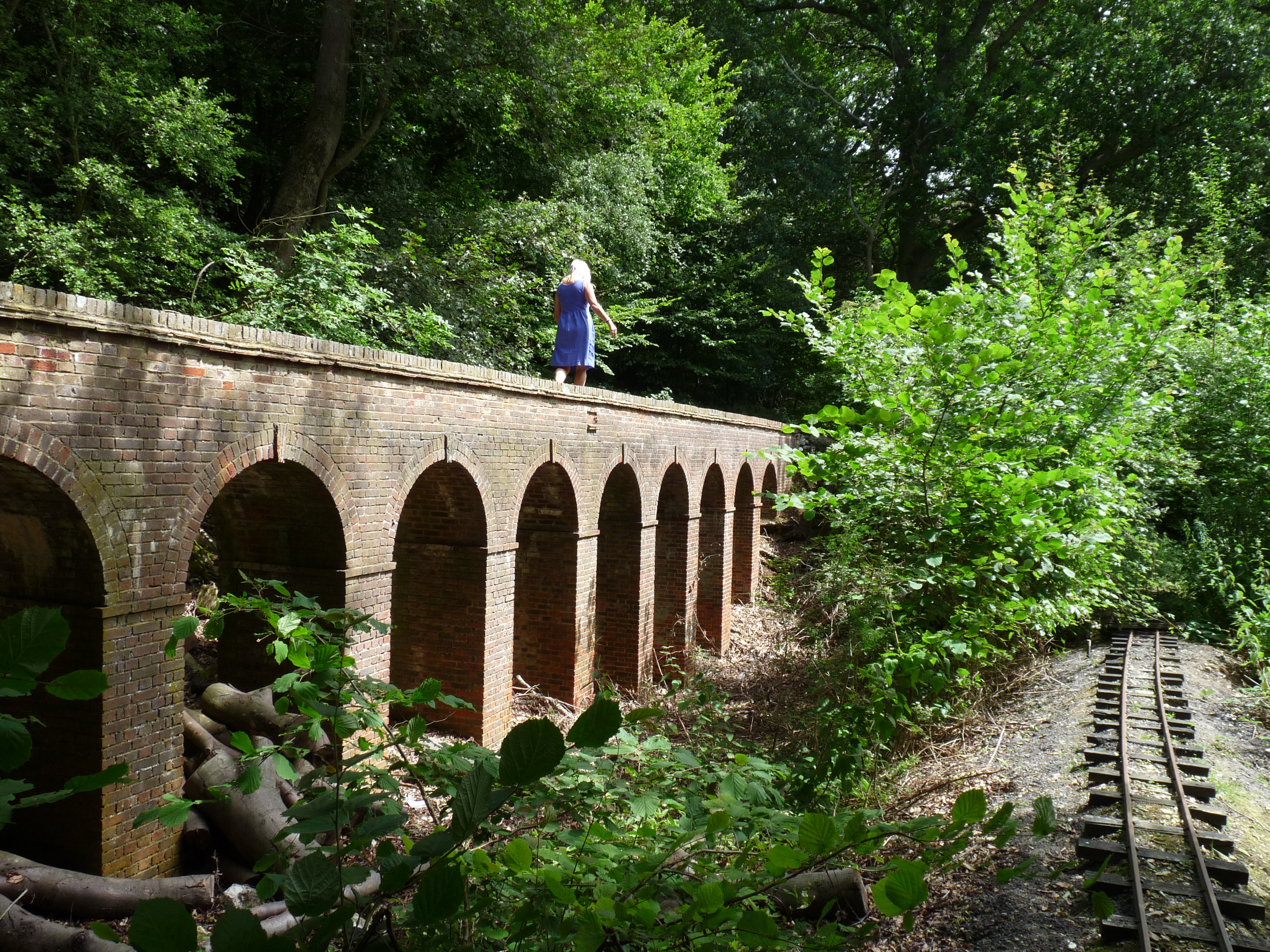
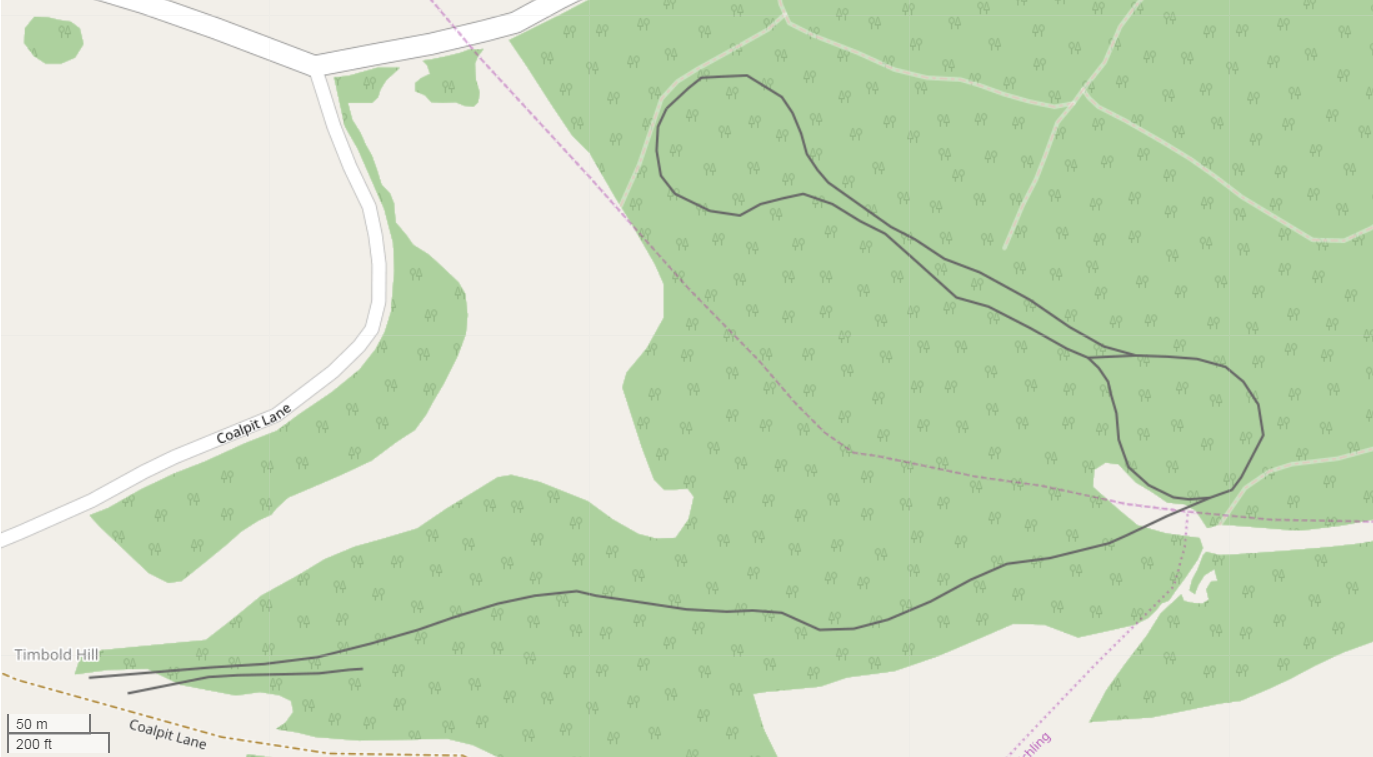
- Viaduct Map of the track

Technical
- Track gauge: 9 in (229 mm)

The Torry Hill Railway is a private miniature railway with the unusual gauge of 9 inches (229 mm) at Torry Hill near Frinsted in the Borough of Maidstone in Kent, England. It operates only occasionally.

== History ==
The Torry Hill Railway was built in the 1930, as many British narrow gauge estate railways. It is maintained and occasionally operated by a group of volunteers. There is still a turntable, a 100 ft (30 m) long tunnel and a viaduct that has been built from realistically scaled miniature bricks. It is owned by the heirs of Sir Robert Leigh-Pemberton, Baron Kingsdown.

The tracks of the Torry Hill Railway lie on private property, which is not accessible by public footpaths or any right of way.

== Photos ==
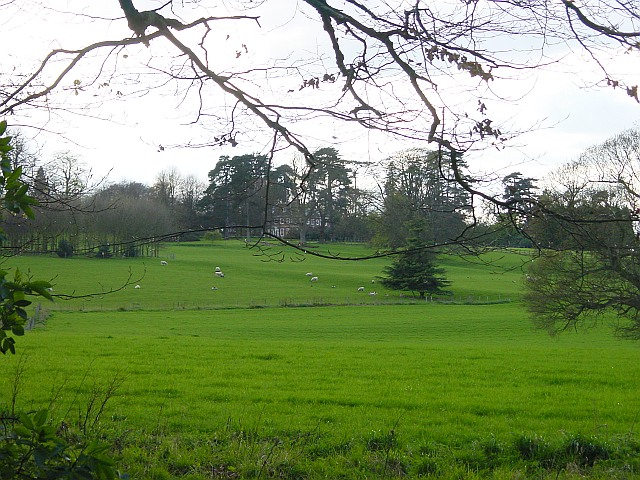
Torry Hill

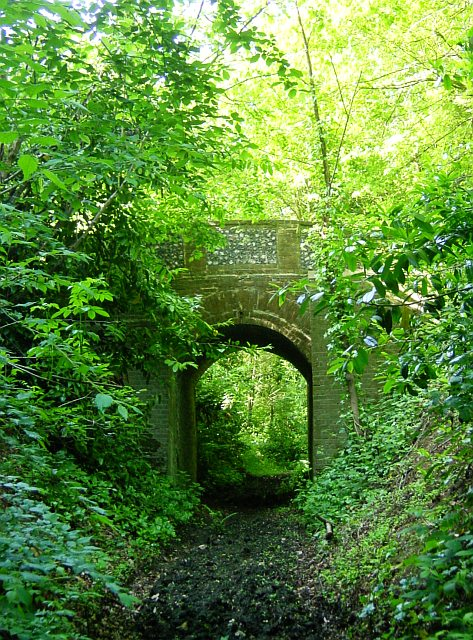
Bridge over a footpath

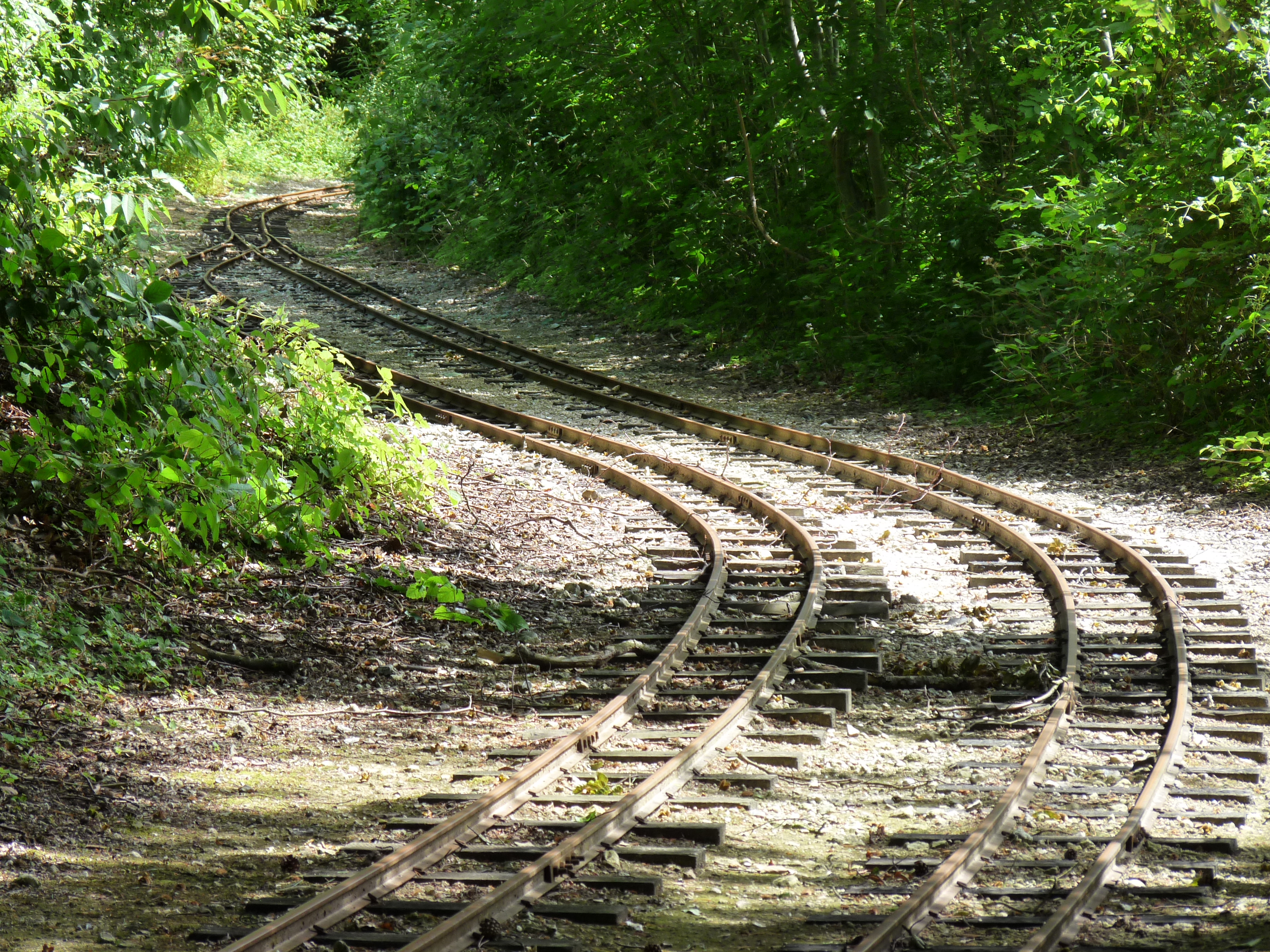
Dual track in the forest

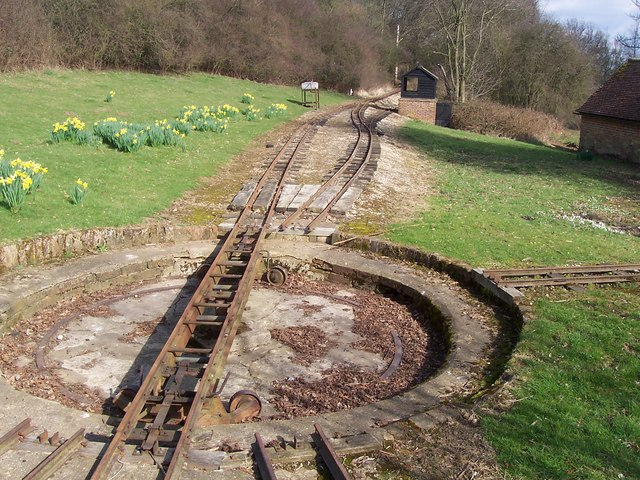
turntable

== Literature ==
- Robert Turcan: Sittingbourne Through Time. Revised Edition. Amberley Publishing Limited, 2015.
