= Toril =

Toril may refer to:

== Philippines ==
- Toril, a district of Davao City in the Philippines
- Toril, a barangay in Samal, Davao del Norte, Philippines
- Turil or Toril, a barangay or village in the municipality of Maribojoc, Bohol province in the Central Visayas region of the Philippines

== Spain ==
- Toril, Cáceres, a municipality in Extremadura, Spain
- Toril y Masegoso, a municipality in the province of Teruel, Aragon, Spain

== Other uses ==
- TorilMUD, a 1996 online game
- Alberto Toril (born 1973), Spanish footballer and coach
- Abeir-Toril, a fictional planet in the Dungeons & Dragons universe

== See also ==
- Torill, a Norwegian given name also written as Toril
