= Torhild Johnsen =

Norwegian politician (1934–2022)

Torhild Marie Helene Johnsen (14 August 1934 – 21 October 2022) was a Norwegian politician for the Christian Democratic Party.

== Life and career ==
Johnsen served as a deputy representative to the Norwegian Parliament from Østfold during the term 1981–1985.

On the local level Johnsen was the mayor of Halden municipality from 2001 to 2003.

Johnsen died on 21 October 2022, at the age of 88.

== Sources ==
- "Torhild Johnsen" (in Norwegian). Storting.
