= Torrie Groening =

Torrie Groening, born in 1961 in Port Alberni, British Columbia, is a photographer and artist based out of Vancouver, British Columbia, Canada. Her art practices include drawing, painting, printmaking, and installation art. Groening is an alumna of the Visual Arts department of The Banff Centre and attended Emily Carr College of Art & Design (now called Emily Carr University of Art and Design) where she studied printmaking.

== Education and career ==
In 1978 Torrie Groening attended The Banff Centre, in Banff, Alberta, followed by courses at Langara College in Vancouver, which lead her to completing her degree, graduating from the Emily Carr Institute of Art and Design in 1983. After graduating, Groening became a member of the Malaspina Printmakers Society of Vancouver and exhibited her work at the Dundarave Print workshop. In 1984, a watershed date in the artist's career, Groening's work was included at the Pressing Matters: Prints by BC Artists exhibition at the Surrey Art Gallery.

Groening worked as a printmaking instructor at Open Studio in Toronto, Ontario later becoming the Director of the Lithography section in 1986. During her time in Toronto Groening worked alongside Janet Cardiff, Harold Klunder, Don Holman, and Otis Tamasausken. In 1989 she went on to teach printmaking at the University of Guelf. That same year she returned to her home of British Columbia, back to Vancouver where she established a printmaking studio called Prior Editions Studios which she ran until 1999. In the 1990s, Groening took on teaching work at both the University of Victoria and Emily Carr Institute of Art and Design. Further along in her career Groening worked with artists including Molly Bobak, Carel Moiseiwitsch, Toni Onley, Gathie Falk, Takao Tanabe, Gordon Smith, Doug Biden, Joe Average, and Jack Shadbolt.

After the closure of her printmaking studio in 1999, Groening moved to San Francisco, California in the United States of America, where the artist joined the Achenbach Graphic Arts Council Board within the Fine Arts Museums of San Francisco and continued her printmaking practices.

== Exhibitions ==
Torrie Groening's CV documents numerous solo and group exhibitions. Her work has been shown at the Vancouver based Capture Photo Festival in 2015, 2017, 2018, and 2019. In partnership with Art Rental & Sales at the Vancouver Art Gallery, Groening exhibited Out of Studio at the Listel Hotel Vancouver in 2017. Her work is also in the permanent collections of such galleries and institutions as the Vancouver Art Gallery, the Morris and Helen Belkin Art Gallery, the Burnaby Art Gallery, the Surrey Art Gallery, and the Art Gallery of Hamilton.
