= Dominique Meyer =

French politician, economist, academic, and opera director

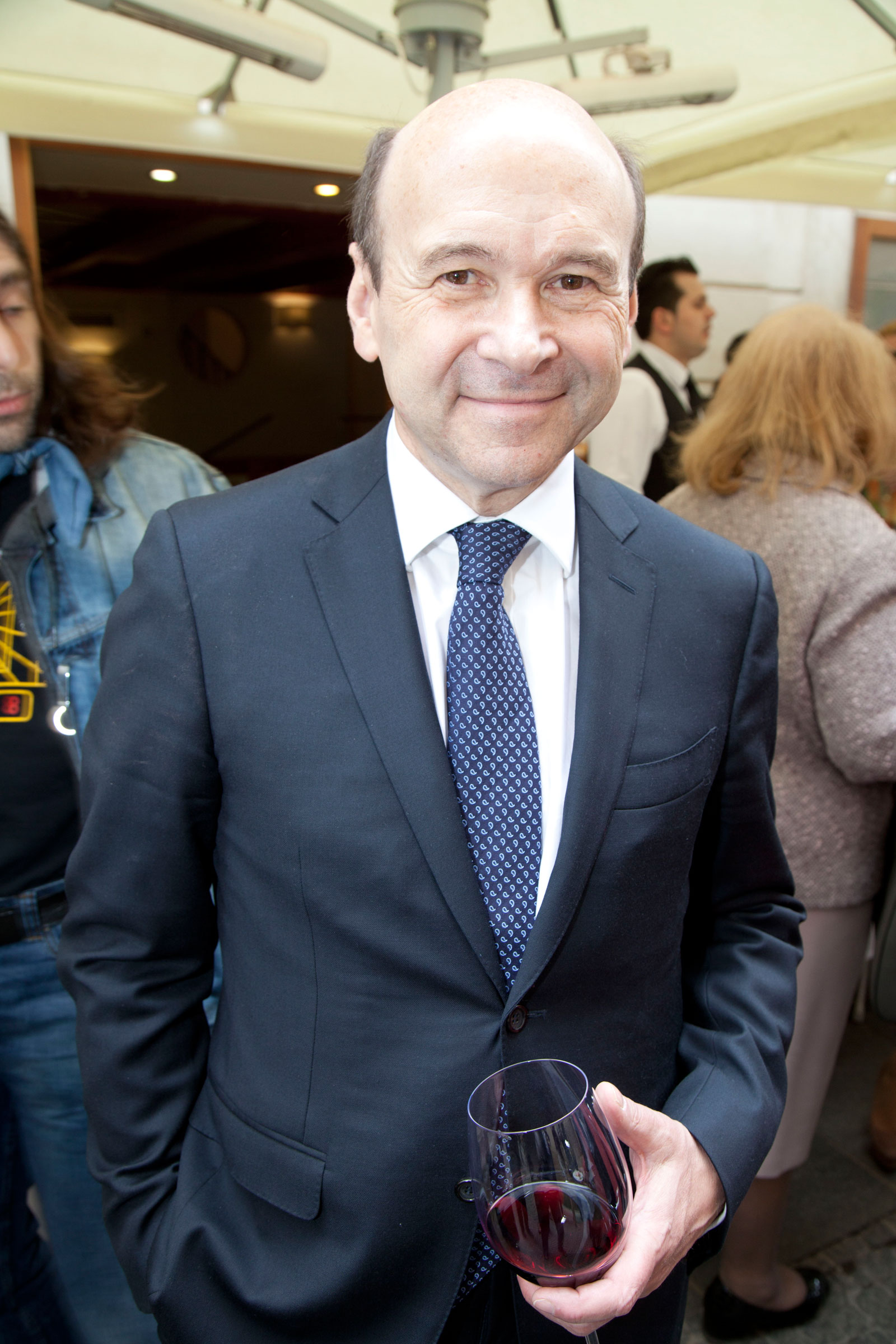

Dominique Meyer (born 1955, Alsace, France) is a French politician, economist, academic, and opera director. From 1989 to 1990 he was General Director of the Paris Opera and from 1994 to 1999 he was General Director of the Lausanne Opera. He also served as a board member for the Orchestre de Chambre de Lausanne from 1995 to 1999. From 1991 to 2007 he served as President of the Ballet Preljocaj, and from 1999 to 2010 he was General and Artistic Director of the Théâtre des Champs-Élysées. He was President of the French Youth Orchestra from 2001 to 2010. From 2010 to 2020, he served as the General Director of the Vienna State Opera. He currently serves on the board of directors for the European Academy of Music Theatre and the Conservatoire de Paris.

== Career ==
Born in Alsace, Meyer began his professional life at Paris Dauphine University where he worked as a researcher in economics at the Institute of Science and Research from 1979 to 1980. He concurrently served as an assistant professor in market economics at Paris 13 University from 1979 to 1982. From 1980 to 1988 he held the post of professor and historian of economics at New Sorbonne University, and from 1986 to 1988 he was professor of economics at Lumière University Lyon 2. Until 2010 he served as lecturer for the course "Master Professionel Administration de la musique et du spectacle vivant" at the University of Évry Val d'Essonne.

While working as an academic, Meyer also served as a commissioner of the French Ministry for the Economy and Finance under Minister Jacques Delors from 1980 to 1984 where he oversaw the departments of electronics and computer industries. He notably oversaw the development of the world's second (and France's first) CD factory during his tenure. He left that department to take a post in the French Ministry of Culture where he served as an advisor in the cabinet of Minister Jack Lang from 1984 to 1986.

Meyer served on the advisory board of the Paris Opera from 1986 to 1988, and was appointed General Director of the company in 1989. He left that post to become a director in the cabinet of the Ministry of Communications and Media under Minister Catherine Tasca. He then served as an advisor to Prime Ministers Édith Cresson and Pierre Bérégovoy from 1991 to 1993. From 1994 to 1999 he was General Director of the Lausanne Opera. He also served as a board member for the Orchestre de Chambre de Lausanne from 1995 to 1999. From 1991 to 2007 he served as President of the Ballet Preljocaj, and from 1999 to 2010 he was General and Artistic Director of the Théâtre des Champs-Élysées. He was President of the French Youth Orchestra from 2001 to 2010. From 2010 to 2020 he served as the Director of the Vienna State Opera.
