= Tori-Bossito =

- Commune and city
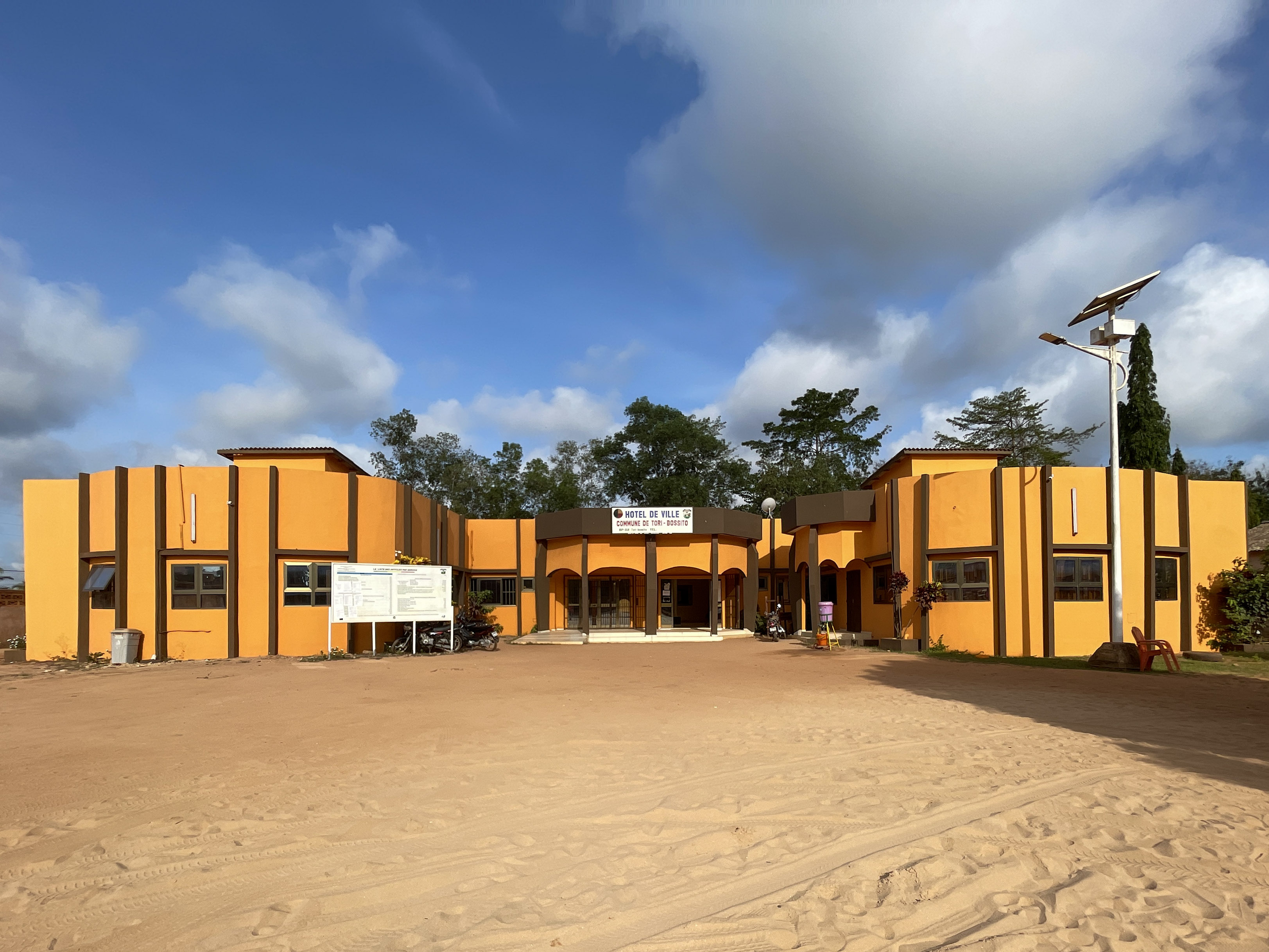

- Location in Benin
- Coordinates: 6°30′11″N 2°8′42″E
- Country: Benin
- Department: Atlantique Department

Area
  - Total: 102 sq mi (263 km^{2})

Population (2009)
  - Total: 44,569
- Time zone: UTC+1 (WAT)

Tori-Bossito [tɔ.ʁi.bɔ.si.to] is a town, arrondissement, and commune in the Atlantique Department of southern Benin. The commune covers an area of 263 square kilometres and as of 2002 had a population of 44,569 people.

Tori is home to a constituent monarchy.
