= Torre (name) =

Torre is an Italian and Spanish surname meaning "tower". Prominent individuals with this surname include:

== Surname ==
- Arath de la Torre (born 1975), Mexican actor
- Carlos María de la Torre (1873–1968), Cardinal of Ecuador
- Carlos Torre Repetto (1905–1978), chess grandmaster from Mexico
- Dara Torre, American politician
- Della Torre, an Italian noble family
- Diego Torre (born 1979), Mexican opera singer
- Diego de la Torre (born 1984), Mexican football player
- Eugenio Torre (born 1951), Filipino chess grandmaster
- Francisco de la Torre (fl 1483–1504), Spanish composer
- Frank Torre (1931–2014), American baseball player; brother of Joe Torre
- Henri Torre (1933–2025), French politician
- Joe Torre (born 1940), American baseball player, manager and executive
- Joel Torre (born 1961), Filipino actor
- Joseph Torre, who goes by the stage name MitiS, American musician and producer
- José Aponte de la Torre (1941–2007), Puerto Rican politician
- José Manuel de la Torre (born 1965), soccer player
- José María Torre (born 1977), Mexican actor
- Karl Wilhelm von Dalla Torre (1850–1928), Austrian entomologist
- Leopoldo Torre Nilsson (1924–1978), Argentine film director
- Lisandro de la Torre (1868–1939), Argentine politician
- Manuel de la Torre (born 1980), Mexican football player
- Marie Torre, American TV personality
- Matilde de la Torre (1884–1946), Spanish writer, socialist and politician
- Moira Dela Torre (born 1993), Filipina singer-songwriter
- Nicolas Torre (born 1970), Filipina police officer and 31st Chief of the Philippine National Police
- Oscar Torre (born 1969), Cuban-American actor
- Pablo Torre (born 1985), American sportswriter
- Pietro Torre (born 2002), Italian fencer
- Pio La Torre (1927–1982), Italian statesman
- Roma Torre (born 1958), American news personality
- Todd La Torre (born 1974), American Singer
- Víctor Raúl Haya de la Torre (1895–1979), Peruvian political leader

== Given name ==
- Torre Catalano American film producer, director and writer

== See also ==
- Torres (surname)
- Torrey (name)
- De la Torre
