= Torrey (name) =

Torrey is a unisex given name and a surname. Prominent individuals with this name include:

== Given name ==
=== Male ===
- Torrey Butler (born 1980), American basketball player
- Torrey C. Brown (1937–2014), American politician
- Torrey Carter (born 1980), American R&B singer
- Torrey Craig (born 1990), American basketball player
- Torrey Davis (born 1988), American football player
- Torrey Harris (born 1991), American politician
- Torrey Johnson (1909–2002), American evangelist and radio show owner
- Torrey Mitchell (born 1985), Canadian hockey player
- Torrey Mosvold (1910–1995), Norwegian shipowner
- Torrey Salter (born 1988), American singer
- Torrey Smith (born 1989), American football wide receiver
- Torrey E. Wales (born 1820), American politician
- Torrey Ward (1978–2015), American basketball coach
- Torrey Westrom (born 1973), Minnesota senator

=== Female ===
- Torrey DeVitto (born 1984), American actress, musician and former fashion model
- Torrey Folk (born 1973), American rower
- Torrey Peters (born 1981), American author

== Surname ==
- Bill Torrey (1934–2018), Canadian Hall-of-Fame National Hockey League general manager
- Bob Torrey (running back) (born 1957), American football running back
- Bradford Torrey (1843–1912), American ornithologist
- Brandon Torrey (born 1983), American football coach and former player
- Charles Cutler Torrey (1863–1956), American ancient historian and archaeologist
- Charles Turner Torrey (1813–1846), American abolitionist
- DeAndre Torrey, (born 1998), American football player
- Ebenezer Torrey (1801–1888), American lawyer, banker, and politician
- E. Fuller Torrey (born 1937), American psychiatrist and researcher
- Ella King Torrey (1957–2003), American scholar, academic administrator
- Fred Torrey (1884–1967), American sculptor
- George Arnold Torrey (1838–1911), American politician, and lawyer
- George Burroughs Torrey (1863–1942), American painter
- George Safford Torrey (1891–1977), American botanist and educator
- Gordon H. Torrey (1919–1995), American philatelist
- Havelock Torrey (1867–1949), Canadian politician
- Henry Augustus Pearson Torrey (1837–1902), American philosopher
- Jesse Torrey (1787–c. 1834), American abolitionist, writer and physician
- John Torrey (1796–1873), American botanist
- Joseph Torrey (academic) (1797–1867), American professor of philosophy and acting president of the University of Vermont
- Joseph W. Torrey (politician) (died 1844), Michigan Territory politician
- Joseph William Torrey (1828–1885), American merchant
- Justin Torrey (born 1983), American mixed martial artist
- Louise Taft (1827–1907), née Torrey, mother of US President William Howard Taft
- Marjorie Torrey (born 1899), American illustrator and writer
- Mary N. Torrey (born 1910), American statistician and quality control expert
- Philip H. Torrey (1884–1968), United States Marine Corps major general
- R. A. Torrey (1856–1928), American evangelist
- Raymond H. Torrey (1880–1938), American outdoorsman
- Return Torrey (1835–1893), American politician
- Robert Torrey (1878–1941), American college football player and coach, member of the College Football Hall of Fame
- Trisha Torrey (born 1951), American author

== See also ==
- Torey, given name and surname
- Torre (name)
