= Torri =

Torri may refer to:

== People ==
=== Last name ===
- Anna Maria Torri (fl. 1684 – c. 1708), Italian soprano
- Armido Torri (1938–2022), Italian rower
- Flaminio Torri (1620-1661), Italian Baroque painter
- Giuseppe Antonio Torri (1655 – c. 1713), Italian architect of the early 18th century
- Giuseppe Torri, also known as Pippo Torri, is an Italian politician
- Julio Torri (1889–1970), Mexican writer and teacher
- Omar Torri (born 1982), Italian professional football player
- Pietro Torri (1650-1737), Italian Baroque composer

=== First name ===
- Torri Edwards (born 1977), American sprinter
- Torri Higginson (born 1969), Canadian actress
- Torri Webster (born 1996), Canadian actress
- Torri Williams (born 1986), American football safety, currently free agent

== Places ==
=== Italy ===
- Torri del Benaco, an Italian municipality in the Province of Verona, Veneto about 130 km west of Venice, on the coast of Lake Garda
- Torri di Quartesolo, an Italian town in the province of Vicenza, Veneto
- Torri in Sabina, an Italian municipality in Latium, about 50 km north of Rome
- Torri, Sovicille, an Italian village in the Tuscan province of Siena
- Torri Superiore, an Italian village in Liguria
