= Anthony (surname) =

Anthony is an English surname. It derived from the Antonius root name. Notable people with the surname include:

- Alfred Webster Anthony (1865–1939), American naturalist
- Allen C. Anthony (1906/1907 - May 10, 1962) American actor and announcer
- Anthony Anthony, creator of the 16th century naval record called the Anthony Roll
- Andre Anthony (born 1996), American football player
- Barbara Cox Anthony (1922–2007), American businesswoman
- Bonita Anthony, American politician
- Byron Anthony (born 1984), Welsh footballer
- Carmelo Anthony (born 1984), American basketball player
- Casey Anthony (born 1986), Florida woman accused of murdering her young child (trial: 2011)
- Champ Anthony (born 2004), American football player
- Charles Anthony (disambiguation), multiple people
- Cole Anthony (born 2000), American basketball player
- Daijahn Anthony (born 2000), American football player
- Daniel Anthony (disambiguation), multiple people
- David Anthony (disambiguation), multiple people
- Derek Anthony (1947–2019), British rear admiral
- Dick Anthony (1939–2022), American forensic psychologist
- Doug Anthony (1929–2020), Australian politician
- Earl Anthony (1938–2001), American professional bowler
- Earle C. Anthony (1880–1961), American businessman
- Evelyn Anthony (1926–2018), British writer
- Florence Anthony, (1947–2010), American poet and educator
- Frank Anthony (1908–1993), Indian politician
- George T. Anthony (1824–1896), American politician
- Gerald Anthony (1951–2004), American actor
- Greg Anthony (born 1967), American basketball player and analyst
- James C. Anthony, American professor and psychiatric epidemiologist
- Jasmine Jessica Anthony (born 1996), American actress
- Joel Anthony (born 1982), Canadian basketball player
- John Gould Anthony (1804–1877), American naturalist and malacologist
- Julie Anthony (disambiguation), multiple people
- Kendall Anthony (born 1993), American basketball player in the Israeli National League
- Kenny Anthony (born 1951), Saint Lucian politician
- Lysette Anthony (born 1963), English actress
- Mark Anthony (disambiguation), multiple people
- Mary Anthony (1916–2014), American dancer and choreographer
- Matt Anthony (Canadian football) (1921–2000), Canadian football player
- Michael Anthony (disambiguation), multiple people
- Oliver Anthony, American country-folk singer-songwriter
- Patricia Anthony (1947–2013), American author
- Piers Anthony (born 1934), English-American writer
- Ray Anthony (born 1922), American bandleader, trumpeter, songwriter and actor
- Roman Anthony (born 2004), American baseball player
- Rufin Anthony (1940–2016), Pakistani Catholic bishop
- Ryan Anthony (1969–2020), American trumpet player
- Sean Anthony (disambiguation), multiple people
- Simon Anthony (disambiguation), multiple people
- Steveroy Anthony (born 1971), Antigua and Barbudan football player
- Susan B. Anthony (1820–1906), American activist
- Tony Anthony (disambiguation), multiple people
- Victoria Anthony (born 1991), American wrestler
- Vincent Anthony Jr. (born 2004), American football player
- Vinny Anthony II (born 2003), American football player
- Wilfred E. Anthony, American architect

== See also ==
- Anthony (disambiguation)
- Anthoney
- Anthoni, name
