= Anthonie =

Dutch masculine given name

Anthonie is a Dutch and masculine given name transliterated from Antonius in use in the Netherlands, Greenland, Suriname, Republic of Karelia, South Africa, Namibia, Belgium and Indonesia. The same spelling is a Norwegian feminine given name that is an alternate name to Antonie in use in Norway. The spellings Antonie and Anthonij were basically interchangeable in Dutch until the 19th century. Notable people with the name include:

- Anthonie Andriessen (1746–1813), Dutch landscape and genre painter
- Anthonie Beerstraaten (1646–aft.1664), Dutch landscape and genre painter
- Anthonie Blocklandt van Montfoort (1533–1583), Dutch painter
- Anthonie van Borssom (1631–1677), Dutch landscape painter
- Anthonie Jansz. van der Croos (1606–1662), Dutch painter
- Anthonie Crussens (c. 1635 – 1665), Flemish draughtsman and printmaker
- Anthonie van Dale (1638–1708), Dutch Mennonite preacher, physician and writer
- Anthonie van Diemen (1593–1645), Governor-General of the Dutch East Indies
- Anthonie Duyck (1560–1629), Grand Pensionary of Holland from 1621 to 1629
- Anthonie Ferreira (born 1955), South African cricketer
- Anthonie Gronum (born 1985), South African rugby player
- Anthonie Hals (1621–1691), Dutch portrait and genre painter
- Anthonie Heinsius (1641–1720), Grand Pensionary of Holland from 1689 to 1720
- Anthonie van der Heim (1693–1746), Grand Pensionary of Holland from 1737 to 1746
- Anthonie Johannes Theodorus Janse (1877–1970), Dutch-born South African entomologist
- Anthonie Knapp, American football player
- Anthonie Leemans (1631–1673), Dutch still life painter
- Anthonie de Lorme (1610–1673), Dutch church interior painter
- Anthonie Rouwenhorst Mulder (1848–1901), Dutch engineer and foreign advisor in Japan
- Anthonie Cornelis Oudemans (1858–1943), Dutch zoologist
- Anthonie Palamedesz. (1602–1673), Dutch genre and portrait painter
- Anthonie II Schetz (1564–1641), Flemish military commander in Spanish service
- Anthonie Wilhelmus Verhoef (born 1946), Dutch painter, ceramist and art lecturer
- Anthonie Verstraelen (1593–1641), Dutch winter landscape painter
- Anthonie Waldorp (1803–1866), Dutch landscape painter

== See also ==
- Anthoni, name
- Anthony (disambiguation)
- Anthonij
- Anthonio (disambiguation)
- Anton (disambiguation)
- Antonia (disambiguation)
- Antonie (given name)
- Antoine
- Antonio
- Antonius
- Antony (disambiguation)
- Tony (disambiguation)
