= Antony (name) =

Antony is a Danish, English, Finnish, German, Norwegian and Swedish given name that is a form of Anthony. As a surname it is derived from the Antonius root name. People with this name include the following:

== Given name ==
- Mark Antony (83–30 BC), Roman politician and general
- Anthony the Great (c. 251–356), also known as Antony, Egyptian saint
- Antony the Younger (785–865), Byzantine soldier, monk and Eastern Orthodox saint
- Anthony of Sourozh (Bloom, 1914–2003) of Sourozh, Russian Orthodox bishop
- Antony (Khrapovitsky) (1863–1936) of Kiev, Russian Orthodox bishop
- Antony (footballer, born 2000) (Antony Matheus dos Santos), Brazilian footballer
- Antony (footballer, born 2001) (Antony Alves Santos), Brazilian footballer
- Antony Acland (1930–2021), British diplomat and Provost of Eton College
- Antony Armstrong-Jones, 1st Earl of Snowdon (1930–2017), English photographer and filmmaker, husband of Princess Margaret
- Antony de Ávila (born 1962), Colombian footballer
- Antony Beevor (born 1946), English military historian
- Antony Blinken (born 1962), American government administrator and secretary of state of the United States
- Antony Caceres (born 2000), Canadian soccer player
- Antony Clark (born 1956), South African educationalist
- Antony Duff (1920–2000), British diplomat and Director General of MI5
- Antony Duff (philosopher) (born 1945), British philosopher
- Antony Flew (1923–2010), English philosopher
- Antony Gormley (born 1950), British sculptor
- Antony Green (born 1960), Australian psephologist and commentator
- Antony Hämäläinen (born 1980), Finnish musician, singer and composer
- Antony Hewish (1924–2021), British radio astronomer, Nobel Prize for Physics
- Antony Jameson (born 1934), British aerospace engineer
- Antony Jay (1930–2016), English writer, broadcaster and director
- Antony Johnston (born 1972), British writer of comics, video games and novels
- Antony Lopez Peralta (born 1981), French footballer
- Tony Newton, Baron Newton of Braintree (1937–2012), British politician
- Antony Padiyara (1921–2000), Indian Roman Catholic archbishop and cardinal
- Antony Page (fl. 1980s–2020s), dean of the Florida International University School of Law
- Antony Pappusamy (born 1949), Indian Roman Catholic archbishop
- Antony Price (1945–2025), English fashion designer
- Antony Raju (born 1954), Indian politician
- Antony Sher (1949–2021), English actor
- Antony Starr (born 1975), New Zealand television actor
- Antony C. Sutton (1925–2002), British and American economist, historian and writer
- Antony Valentini (born 1965), British theoretical physicist
- Tony Whitlam (born 1944), Australian lawyer, judge, politician and son of former Australian Prime Minister Gough Whitlam

== Surname ==
- A. K. Antony (born 1940), Indian politician, former Defence Minister of India and three-time Chief Minister of the state of Kerala
- Anto Antony (born 1956), Indian politician
- Johny Antony (fl. 1991–present), Indian film director
- Milton Antony (1789–1839), American medical doctor, gynecologist and educator
- P. J. Antony (1925–1979), Indian stage and film actor
- Steve Antony, British children's author and illustrator

== See also ==
- Anthony (disambiguation)
- Antona (name)
- Antone
- Antoni, a given name and surname
- Antonie (disambiguation)
- Antono (name)
