= Antonios =

Antonios or Antónios (Αντώνιος) is a masculine given name used in Greece that is a variant of Antonis, as well as a surname. It is assumed that the origin lies in Etruscan.

Notable people with this name include the following:

== Given name ==
- Abune Antonios (1927–2022), Eritrean Oriental Orthodox archbishop
- Antonios Antoniadis (born 20th-century), Greek physician
- Antonios Antonopoulos (1805–1887), Greek politician
- Antonios Aronis (born 1957), Greek water polo player
- Antonios Asimakopoulos (born 1976), Greek basketball player
- Antonios Eparchos (1491–1571), Greek humanist, soldier and poet
- Antonios Fokaidis (born 1989), Greek swimmer
- Antonios Georgantas (1799–1884), Greek Major General
- Antonios Georgoulis (born 1928), Greek wrestler
- Antonios Giannoulas (born 1976), Greek boxer
- Antonios Gioulbas (born 1986), Greek swimmer
- Antonios Gryllos (1917–1993), Greek wrestler
- Antonios Kalamogdartis (1810–1856), Greek politician
- Antonios Karyofyllis (1904–1989), Greek athlete
- Antonios Katinaris (1931–1999), Greek musician
- Antonios Keramopoulos (1870–1960), Greek archaeologist
- Antonios Komizopoulos (fl. 19th-century), Greek merchant
- Antonios Kounadis (born 1937), Greek discus athlete
- Antonios Kriezis (1796–1865), Greek military officer
- Antonios Mangos (1910 – 1940/1941), Greek middle-distance athlete
- Antonios Mastoras (born 1991), Greek high jump athlete
- Antonios Mavromichalis (1792–1873), Greek revolutionary, military officer and politician
- Antonios Miaoulis (1800–1836), Greek politician
- Antonios Mikos, Greek-American biomedical engineer
- Antonios Miliarakis (1841–1905), Greek geographer and historian
- Antonios Sajih Mokbel, known as Tony Mokbel (born 1965), Australian criminal
- Antonios Naguib (born 1935), Egyptian cardinals
- Antonios Nikopolidis (born 1971), Greek footballer
- Antonios Papadakis (1810–1878), Greek merchant
- Antonios Papadopoulos (born 1999), German footballer
- Antonios Papadopoulos (wrestler) (born 1964), Greek wrestler
- Antonios Papaioannou, Greek gymnast
- Antonios Pepanos (1866–1918), Greek swimmer
- Antonios Trakatellis (born 1931), Greek politician and biochemist
- Antonios Tsakiropoulos (born 1969), Greek volleyball player
- Antonios Varthalitis (1924–2007), Greek Roman Catholic Archbishop
- Antonios Vlontakis (born 1975), Greek water polo player
- Antonios Grigorios Voutsinos (1891–1968), Greek Roman Catholic archbishops
- Antonios Vouzas (born 1993), Greek footballer
- Antonios Zavaliangos, American material scientist and engineer
- Antonios Zois (1869–1941), Greek chieftain

== Middle name ==
- Markos Antonios Katsaitis (1717–1787), Greek scholar, geographer and lawyer

== See also ==
- Andonios Liveralis
- Antonio, given name
- Antonis, name
