= Antonić =

Antonic or Antonić is a Slavic surname according to Slavic naming customs. Notable people with this name include the following:

- Borislav Antonić (born 1964), Serbian politician
- Dejan Antonić (born 1969), Serbian footballer
- Goran Antonić (born 1990), Serbian footballer
- Jovica Antonić (born 1966), Serbian basketballer
- Slobodan Antonić (born 1959), Serbian political scientist, sociologist and university professor
- Stefan Antonić (born 2001), Indonesian footballer of partial Serbian descent
- Vasilije Antonić (1860–1929), Serbian army officer, diplomat and politician
- Voja Antonić (born 1952) Serbian inventor, journalist and writer

== See also ==
- Anton (given name)
- Antoni
- Antonia (name)
- Antonie (given name)
- Antonie (surname)
- Antonik
- Antonin (name)
- Antonio
- Antonis
- Antoniu
- Gary Antonick
