= Antonik =

Antonik Slavic surname according to Slavic naming customs. The name is derived from the given name Anton. Notable people with this name include the following:

- Arkadius Antonik, of German band Suidakra
- Kamil Antonik (born 1998), Polish footballer
- Marian Antonik (born 1963). Polish social and political activist, historian, teacher, scout instructor
- Nathan Antonik, Australian former professional rugby league footballer
- Vladimir Antonik (born 1953), Russian actor and voice actor

== See also ==
- Antoni
- Antonia (name)
- Antonić
- Antonie (given name)
- Antonie (surname)
- Antonin (name)
- Antonio
- Antonis
- Antoniu
- Antoniuk (name)
- Gary Antonick
