= Antonis =

- Gender: Male
- Name day: 17 January

Origin
- Origin: Antonius
- Region of origin: prob. Etruria

Other names
- Related names: Antonios, Andonis, Anthony, Antonio, Anton, Andon, Antoine

Antonis (Greek alphabet: Αντώνης) is a variant of Antonios being used in Greece and Cyprus, which in turn is a form of Antonius, the name of a Roman gens. It is assumed that the origin lies in Etruscan.

Antonis is also a Dutch masculine given name that is a diminutive of Anthonius that is used in Netherlands, Belgium, South Africa, Namibia, Indonesia and Suriname. It is sometimes a surname and is transliterated as Antonios and Andonis. Antonis is a cognate of the English language name Anthony.

People bearing the name Antonis or Antónis include:

== Given name ==
- Antonis Antoniadis (born 1946), Greek footballer
- Antonis Antoniadis (born 1946), Greek naval officer
- Antonis Aresti (born 1983), Cypriot track and field paralympian athlete
- Antonis Benakis (1873–1954), Greek art collector and museum founder
- Antonis Bourselis (born 1994), Greek footballer
- Antonis Constantinides (born 1974), Cypriot basketball coach
- Antonis Christeas (1937–2011), Greek basketball player
- Antonis Daglis (1974–1997), Greek serial killer
- Antonis Dedakis (born 1995), Greek footballer
- Antonis Diamantidis (1892–1945), Greek rebetiko musician
- Antonis Drossoyannis (1922–2006), Greek Army general and politician
- Antonis Fostieris (born 1953), Greek poet
- Antonis Fotiadis (1899–19??), Greek footballer
- Antonis Fotsis (born 1981), Greek basketball player
- Antonis Georgallides (born 1982), Cypriot footballer
- Antonis Georgiades, Cypriot politician
- Antonis Georgiadis (1933–2020), Greek footballer
- Antonis Iliadis (born 1993), Greek footballer
- Antonis Kablionis (born 1991), Greek footballer
- Antonis Kafetzopoulos (born 1951), Greek actor
- Antonis Kanakis (born 1969), Greek television host and an actor
- Antonis Kapnidis (born 1992), Greek footballer
- Antonis Katsantonis (c. 1775–1808), Greek klepht
- Antonis Katsis (born 1989), Cypriot footballer
- Antonis Koniaris (born 1997), Greek basketball player
- Antonis Kotsakas (born 1947), Greek politician
- Antonis Ladakis (born 1982), Greek footballer
- Antonis Makris (born 1981), Cypriot footballer
- Antonis Manikas (born 1959), Greek footballer and manager
- Antonis Manitakis (born 1944), Greek politician and educator
- Antonis Mantzaris (born 1986), Greek basketball player
- Antonis Martasidis (born 1992), Greek-Cypriot weightlifter
- Antonis Michaloglou (born 1988), Greek basketball player
- Antonis Migiakis (1911–1999), Greek footballer
- Antonis Minou (born 1958), Greek footballer
- Antonis Natsouras (born 1979), Greek footballer
- Antonis Nikolaidis (born 1967), British-Cypriot sport shooter
- Antonis Oikonomou (1785–1821), Greek naval captain
- Antonis Panagi (born 1983), Cypriot footballer
- Antonis Papadakis (1893–1980), Greek Cretan lyra musician
- Antonis Papasavvas (born 1995), Greek footballer
- Antonis Paschalides (born 1952), Greek-Cypriot politician and lawyer
- Antonis Petropoulos (born 1986), Greek footballer
- Antonis Ranos (born 1993), Greek footballer
- Antonis Remos (born 1970), Greek singer
- Antonis Rikka (born 1986), French-Greek footballer
- Antonis Roupakiotis, Greek lawyer and politician
- Antonis Samarakis (1919–2003), Greek writer
- Antonis Samaras (born 1951), Greek politician. former Prime Minister of Greece
- Antonis Siatounis (born 2002), Greek footballer
- Antonis Tritsis (1937–1992), Greek politician
- Antonis Tsiaras (born 1993), Greek footballer
- Antonis Tsotras (born 1990), Greek sport sailor
- Antonis Vardis (1948–2014), Greek composer and singer
- Antonis Volanis (born 1948), Greek automobile and industrial designer
- Antonis Vratsanos (1919–2008), Greek communist saboteur
- Antonis Xylouris (born 1937), Greek composer, singer, Cretan lyra performer

== Surname ==
- Carlos De Antonis, Argentine opera singer
- Terry Antonis (born 1993), Australian footballer

== See also ==
- Andonis
- Antonic
- Anthonis
- Antonijs
- Antonios
- Antonik
- Antoniu
