= Charles Rochussen =

Dutch painter (1814–1894)

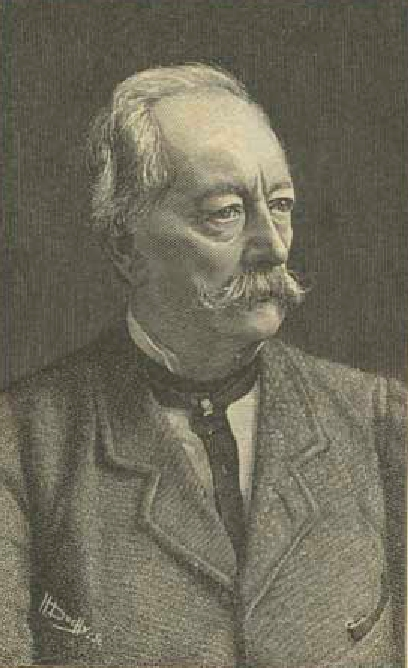
- Portrait of Rochussen by Johannes Baer
- Born: 1 August 1814; Kralingen, Netherlands
- Died: 22 September 1894 (aged 80); Rotterdam, Netherlands
- Movement: Impressionism

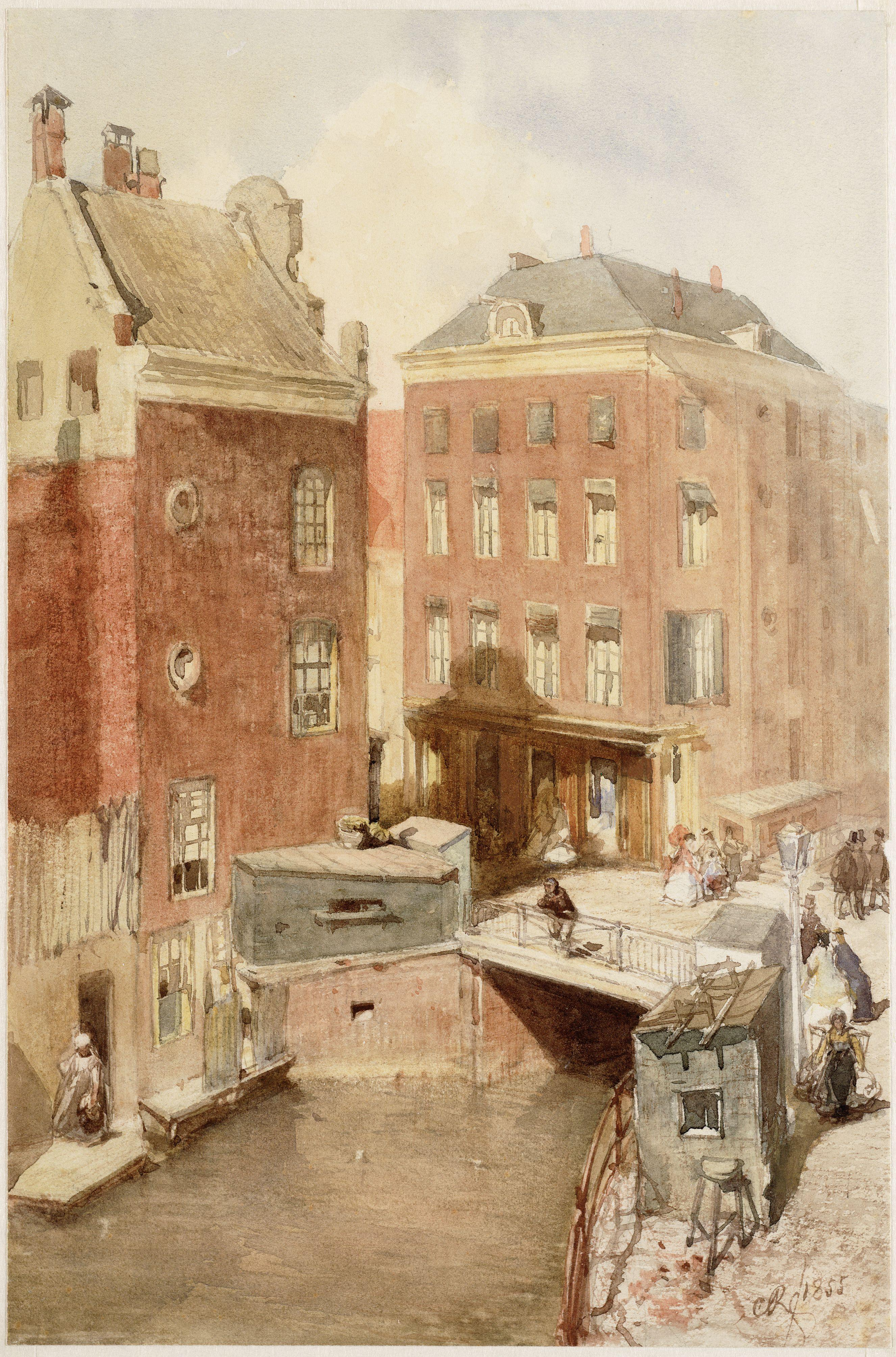
The Osjessluis in Amsterdam, a watercolor of Rochussen from 1855

Charles Rochussen (1 August 1814 in Kralingen – 22 September 1894 in Rotterdam) was a Dutch illustrator and printmaker.

Rochussen was the second son of the wealthy businessman and art collector Hendrik Rochussen (1779–1852), who was himself an amateur draftsman of some distinction and owned an extensive art and history library.

His brother Henri Rochussen (1812–1889) became a painter. While still a child, Charles showed a talent for drawing; between 1831 and 1834 he produced watercolor studies of birds. However, it was decided that he would pursue a career in business.

He worked for a few years in an office before resolving at the age of 22 to turn to painting. In 1837, he enrolled at the academy in The Hague, where he was taught by Wijnand Nuijen (1813–1839) and, after Nuyen's death, by Anthonie Waldorp (1803–1866).

During his Hague period, which lasted until 1843 (or, according to some sources, 1846), he painted landscapes and beach and village views. From 1849 to 1869, he lived in Amsterdam and thereafter in Rotterdam. He started painting looser, more along the lines of the upcoming Impressionism movement.
