= Antonie =

Antonie may refer to:

- Antonie (given name)
- Antonie (surname)
- Antonie, Lord of Monaco (died 1427)
- Antonie, Masovian Voivodeship, Poland, a village
- Antonie, Silesian Voivodeship, Poland, a village

== See also ==
- Antoni, a given name and surname
- Antony (disambiguation)
