= Hermann Duft and Hans Wilhelm Bassenauer =

German serial killers executed in 1969

- Mugshot of Bassenauer (left) and Duft at the time of their arrest, from Macedonia newspaper, 17 April 1969
- Born: Hermann Duft; 1938; Frankfurt, Nazi Germany; Hans Bassenauer; 1938; Darmstadt, Nazi Germany
- Died: Hermann Duft; 15 December 1969 (aged 31); Corfu, Greece; Hans Bassenauer; 15 December 1969 (aged 31); Aegina, Greece
- Cause of death: Execution by firing squad
- Status: Executed
- Convictions: Murder (6 counts); Robbery; Attempted murder
- Penalty: Death

Details
- Victims: 6
- Span of crimes: 6 March 1969 – 12 April 1969
- Country: Greece

Hermann Duft and Hans Wilhelm Bassenauer were a pair of German spree killers who murdered six people in Greece, within a short period in 1969. They were captured, tried, sentenced to death and executed by the Greek authorities.

== Background ==
Duft was born in Harheim near Frankfurt and Bassenauer in Darmstadt, Germany, both in 1938. They were both plumbers. Duft was single, while Bassenauer was married, with three children. Duft had briefly served in the Foreign Legion during the war in Algeria.

== Crimes ==
Duft and Bassenauer arrived in Greece by car on 17 February 1969. Within the next few weeks, posing as tourists, they murdered six people, using a Winchester rifle and a knife. The reason for most of their murders was robbery. On the 5 March, they killed the night watchmen of a gas station near Thebes, a soldier who was present and heavily injured another one. On 13 March, they murdered a Greek-American stockbroker in Voula, on 7 April a taxi driver and on 9 April a gas station attendant near Athens. Finally, on 12 April, they murdered, on the road from Athens to Patras, a Greek who was living in Germany and vacationing in his homeland. They abandoned their car and took the victim's to return to Athens.

The dictatorial regime in Greece at the time forbade newspapers to publish news about this series of murders until the two perpetrators were captured.

== Capture ==
The police were alerted, on 16 April, by a man who saw "small specks of blood" on a car with German license plates parked outside his house, which was, in fact, the car of the pair's last victim. Duft and Bassenauer were apprehended when they showed up to pick up the car, questioned and then arrested by the police. They confessed to their crimes and were put on trial, accused of murder, robbery, and related charges.

== Trial and punishment ==
The trial of Duft and Bassenauer was held shortly thereafter at the Appeals Court. They were found guilty and sentenced to death for each one of the murders. Their appeal was rejected by the Areopagus Supreme Court, as was their request to the Council of Pardons to reduce their sentence to life imprisonment. They were executed by firing squad on 15 December 1969, Bassenauer in Corfu and Duft in Aegina, in whose prisons they were respectively being held.

Bassenauer's widow subsequently stated, "my husband got a just punishment", but objected to the execution taking place near Christmas time. An article in a German magazine observed that "in the end, another German citizen has been executed as a murderer".

== See also ==
- List of serial killers by country
- Antonis Daglis, the "Athens Ripper"
