= Antonie (given name) =

- Gender: Masculine (Dutch); Feminine (Czech, German)
- Language: Dutch, Romanian

Other names
- Related names: Anthony, Antonia

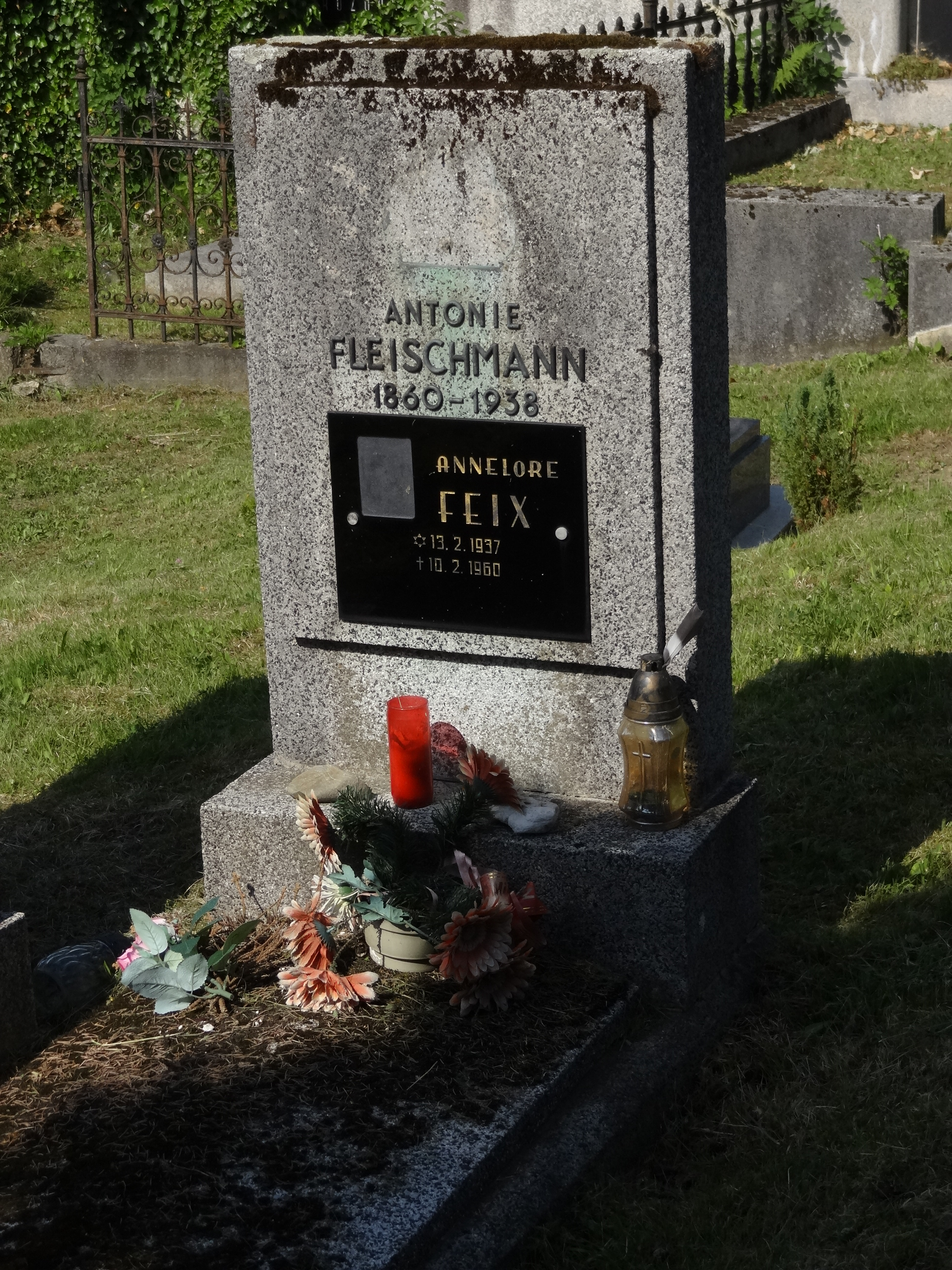
Antonie

Antonie is a given name with several origins and uses.

In the Dutch language, it is a masculine name derived from Antonius. It is used in areas where Dutch and Afrikaans are spoken.

In Czech, Danish, German, Norwegian, and Swedish, it is a feminine name cognate to Antonia.

In Romanian, it is a masculine name.

Notable persons with the name include:

== Masculine name ==
- Antonie, Lord of Monaco (died 1427)
- Antonie Augustus Bruijn (1842–1890), Dutch navy officer and naturalist
- Antonie Claassen (born 1984), South African rugby player
- Antonie Dixon (1968–2009), New Zealand criminal
- Antonie de Gee (1872–1940), Dutch sports shooter
- Antonie Gerrits (1885–1969), Dutch cyclist
- Antonie Marinus Harthoorn (1923–2012), Dutch-born South African veterinarian and environmentalist
- Antonie Iorgovan (1948–2007), Romanian jurist, professor and politician
- Antonie Kamerling (1966–2010), Dutch actor and musician
- Antonie van Leeuwenhoek (1632–1723), Dutch scientist
- Antonie Aris van de Loosdrecht (1885–1917), Dutch Protestant missionary on Sulawesi
- Antonie Misset (1901–1974), Dutch wrestler
- Antonie Frederik Jan Floris Jacob van Omphal (1788–1863), Dutch lieutenant-general
- Antonie Pannekoek (1873–1960), Dutch astronomer, Marxist theorist, and social revolutionary
- Antonie Sminck Pitloo (1790–1837), Dutch landscape painter
- Antonie Plămădeală (1926–2005), Romanian bishop
- Antonie Vodă din Popești (f.1669–1672), Ruler of Wallachia
- Antonie Viljoen (1858–1918), Afrikaner liberal politician
- Antonie Waterloo (1609–1690), Dutch landscape painter
- Antonie Frederik Zürcher (1825–1876), Dutch painter, draughtsman, etcher and art teacher

== Feminine name ==
- Antonie Adamberger (1790–1867), Austrian stage actress
- Antonie Barth (1871–1956), Bavarian actress and wife of Ludwig Wilhelm, Duke in Bavaria
- Antonie Brentano (1780–1869), Austrian philanthropist, art collector, and arts patron
- Antonie Hegerlíková (1923–2012), Czech actress
- Antonie Jaeckel (1876–1960), German actress
- Antonie Langendorf (1894–1969), German political activist and politician
- Antonie Mielke (1856–1907), German operatic soprano
- Antonie Nedošinská (1885–1950), Czech film actress
- Antonie Rädler (1899–1991), German mystic and neo-revelationist
- Antonie Stemmler (1892–1976), German teacher, nurse and member of the fascist resistance
- Antonie Strassmann (1901–1952), German stage actress and aviator

== See also ==
- Anthonie, Dutch given name practically interchangeable with Antonie
- Antonee
- Antonic
- Antonije
- Antonik
- Antonin (name)
- Antonine (name)
- Antoniu
- Antony (disambiguation)
