= Anthony Daniels (disambiguation) =

Anthony Daniels (born 1946) is an English actor.

Anthony Daniels may also refer to:

- Anthony Malcolm Daniels (born 1949), pen name Theodore Dalrymple, British psychiatrist and writer
- Anthony Daniels (politician) (born 1982), member of the Alabama House of Representatives
- Robert Anthony Daniels (born 1957), sometimes referred to as R. Anthony Daniels or Anthony Daniels, Canadian Catholic archbishop and bishop

== See also ==
- Tony Daniels (born 1963), Canadian voice actor
- Tony Daniels (baseball) (1923–2005), American baseball player
- Daniel Anthony (disambiguation)
