= Anthoni =

Anthoni is a Swedish, Danish, Finnish and Norwegian form of the given name and surname "Antoni" that is used in Finland, Denmark, Sweden, Norway, Republic of Karelia, Estonia and Greenland.

Notable people with the name include the following:

== Given first name ==
- Anthoni van Noordt (c. 1619 – 1675), Dutch composer
- Anthoni Schoonjans (1655–1726), Flemish painter

== Middle name ==
- Charles Brooke, Rajah of Sarawak (born Charles Anthoni Johnson Brooke; 1829–1917), Sarawak royalty

== Surname ==
- Arno Anthoni (1900–1961), Finnish lawyer and holocaust perpetrator
- Anna Berentine Anthoni (1884–1951), Norwegian trade unionist and politician

== See also ==
- Anthon (given name)
- Anthon (surname)
- Anthonie
- Anthonij
- Anthonis
- Anthonio (disambiguation)
- Anthony (given name)
- Anthony (surname)
- Antoni
