= Scott Anthony =

Scott Anthony may refer to:

- Scott Anthony, ring name for Scott Levy (born 1964), professional wrestler
- Scott Anthony, major in the Third Colorado Cavalry

== See also ==
- Scott Antony, actor in Dead Cert
- Anthony (surname)
