= Anthon =

Anthon may refer to:

- Anthon (given name)
- Anthon (surname)
- Anthon, Iowa, US
- Anthon, Isère, a commune of the Isère département, in France

== See also ==
- Anthon B Nilsen, Norwegian investment company
- Anthon Berg, Danish chocolatier
- Anthon Transcript, a Mormon document
