= Patriarch Antony I =

Patriarch Antony I or Patriarch Anthony I may refer to:

- Antony I of Constantinople, Archbishop of Constantinople and Ecumenical Patriarch from 821 to 837
- Antony I, Serbian Patriarch, Archbishop of Peć and Serbian Patriarch from 1571 to 1574
- Antony I, Eritrean Patriarch, Archbishop of Asmara and Eritrean Patriarch from 2004 to 2007

== See also ==
- Patriarch (disambiguation)
- Antony (disambiguation)
