= Anthonij =

Anthonij is a given name. Notable people with that name include the following

- Anthonij Ewoud Jan Bertling (1860 – 1945), Dutch politician
- Anthonij Guépin (1897 – 1964), Dutch sailor
- Anthonij Rudolf Mauve, known as Anton Mauve (1838 – 1888), Dutch realist painter

== See also ==
- Anthoni, name
- Anthonie, given name
- Anthonio (disambiguation)
