= Antoni =

Antoni is a Catalan, Polish, and Slovene given name and a surname used in the eastern part of Spain, Poland and Slovenia. As a Catalan given name it is a variant of the male names Anton and Antonio. As a Polish given name it is a variant of the female names Antonia and Antonina. As a Slovene name it is a variant of the male names Anton, Antonij and Antonijo and the female name Antonija. As a surname it is derived from the Antonius root name. It may refer to:

== Given name ==
- Antoni Brzeżańczyk, Polish football player and manager
- Antoni Gaudi, Catalan architect
- Antoni Gutiérrez Díaz (1929–2006), Catalan physician and politician
- Antoni Kenar, Polish sculptor
- Antoni Lima, Catalan footballer
- Antoni Łomnicki, Polish mathematician
- Antoni Melchior Fijałkowski, Polish bishop
- Antoni Niemczak, Polish long-distance runner
- Antoni Pietkiewicz (born 1948) is a Polish engineer, businessperson and politician
- Józef Antoni Poniatowski, Polish prince and Marshal of France
- Antoni Popiel, Polish sculptor
- Antoni Porowski, Polish-Canadian chef, actor, and television personality
- Antoni Radziwiłł, Polish politician
- Antoni Słonimski, Polish poet and writer
- Antoni Wit, Polish conductor
- Antoni Zygmund, Polish mathematician

== Surname ==
- Brian Antoni (born 1958), American author
- Carmen-Maja Antoni (born 1945), German actress
- E.J. Antoni, American economist
- Janine Antoni (born 1964), Bahamian artist
- Jennipher Antoni (born 1976), German actress
- Lorenc Antoni (1909 – 1991), Kosovo Albanian composer
- Mateo Antoni (born 2003), Uruguayan footballer
- Mark De Gli Antoni (born 1962), American composer
- Robert Antoni (born 1958), West Indian writer
- Robert "Stewkey" Antoni (born 1947), American musician
- Valdete Antoni (born 1953), Albanian poet
- Voldemar Antoni (1886 – 1974), Ukrainian anarchist

== See also ==
- Anthoni, name
- Anthony (disambiguation)
- Antonic
- Antonik
- Antonin (name)
- Antoniu
- Antono (name)
- Antony (disambiguation)
- Anttoni Honka
