= Anthonis =

Anthonis is a Dutch masculine given name and a surname that is popular in the Provinces of the Netherlands, Belgium, Suriname, South Africa, Namibia, and Indonesia. Notable people with this name include the following:

== Given name ==
- Anthonis Mor van Dashorst, also known as Antonis Mor (c. 1517 – 1577), Dutch painter
- Anthonis van Obbergen (1543 – 1611), Flemish architect

== Surname ==
- Lode Anthonis (1922 – 1992), Belgian cyclist
- P. R. Anthonis (1911 – 2009), Sri Lankan surgeon

== See also ==
- Anthoni
- Stefan Anthonisz
- Antonis
