= Anthoney =

Anthoney is a given name and a surname, which is derived from the Antonius root name. Notable people with this name include the following:

== Given name ==
- Anthoney Hill (born 1971), American gridiron football player

== Surname ==
- Charles Anthoney (1902–1982), English footballer
- Ernest Anthoney (1879–1961), Australian politician in South

== See also ==
- Anthony (given name)
- Anthony (surname)
