= Anthony David =

Anthony David may refer to:

- Anthony David (neuropsychiatrist), professor of cognitive neuropsychiatry at the Institute of Psychiatry, King's College London
- Anthony David (singer) (born 1971), American R&B singer-songwriter
- Tony David (born 1967), Australian darts player

== See also ==
- Tony David (baseball), American college baseball coach
- David Anthony (disambiguation)
