= Antonie (surname) =

Antonie is a surname. Notable people with this surname include the following:

- Colin Antonie (born 1952), former Australian rules footballer
- Peter Antonie (born 1958), Australian former rower
- William Lee Antonie (1764–1815), English politician and Member of Parliament

== See also ==
- Antonie (disambiguation)
- Antonie (given name)
