= Simon Anthony =

Simon Anthony may refer to:

- Simon Anthony, presenter of YouTube channel Cracking the Cryptic
- Simon Callaghan, full name Simon Anthony Callaghan (born 1983), English-American racehorse trainer
- Simon Hart, full name Simon Anthony Hart (born 1963), English politician
- Simon Kimmins, full name Simon Edward Anthony Kimmins (1930–2025), English former cricketer
- Simon Segars, full name Simon Anthony Segars (born 1967), English board executive
- Simon Ward, full name Simon Anthony Fox Ward (1941–2012), English actor

== See also ==
- Anthony Laden, full name Anthony Simon Laden, American philosopher
- Anthony Banua-Simon, American documentary film director
- Simeon Anthony Pereira (1927–2006), former archbishop of Karachi
