= Anhonee =

Anhonee may refer to:

- Anhonee (1952 film), a 1952 Hindi film starring Nargis and Raj Kapoor
- Anhonee (1973 film), a 1973 Hindi film directed by Ravi Tandon

== See also ==
- Antonee
