= Antonen =

Surname list

Antonen is a Finnish surname. Notable people with the surname include:

- Joose Antonen (born 1995), Finnish ice hockey player
- Juuso Antonen (born 1988), Finnish ice hockey player

== See also ==
- Antonin (name)
- Antenen
- Antone
- Antonee
