= Sicherman dice =

Pair of non-standard six-sided dice

A pair of Sicherman dice. Opposite faces sum to 5 on the left die, and 9 on the right.

Sicherman dice /ˈsɪkərmən/ are a pair of 6-sided dice with non-standard numbers—one with the sides 1, 2, 2, 3, 3, 4 and the other with the sides 1, 3, 4, 5, 6, 8. They are notable as the only pair of 6-sided dice that are not normal dice, bear only positive integers, and have the same probability distribution for the sum as normal dice. They were invented in 1978 by George Sicherman of Buffalo, New York.

== Mathematics ==
Comparison of sum tables of normal (N) and Sicherman (S) dice. If zero is allowed, normal dice have one variant (N') and Sicherman dice have two (S' and S"). Each table has 1 two, 2 threes, 3 fours etc.

A standard exercise in elementary combinatorics is to calculate the number of ways of rolling any given value with a pair of fair six-sided dice (by taking the sum of the two rolls). The table shows the number of such ways of rolling a given value $n$:

Number of ways to roll a given number
n	2	3	4	5	6	7	8	9	10	11	12
Number of ways	1	2	3	4	5	6	5	4	3	2	1

Crazy dice is a mathematical exercise in elementary combinatorics, involving a re-labeling of the faces of a pair of six-sided dice to reproduce the same frequency of sums as the standard labeling. The Sicherman dice are crazy dice that are re-labeled with only positive integers. (If the integers need not be positive, to get the same probability distribution, the number on each face of one die can be decreased by k and that of the other die increased by k, for any natural number k, giving infinitely many solutions.)

The table below lists all possible totals of dice rolls with standard dice and Sicherman dice. One Sicherman die is colored for clarity: 1–2–2–3–3–4, and the other is all black, 1–3–4–5–6–8.

Possible totals of dice rolls with standard dice and Sicherman dice
	2	3	4	5	6	7	8	9	10	11	12
Standard dice	1+1	1+2; 2+1	1+3; 2+2; 3+1	1+4; 2+3; 3+2; 4+1	1+5; 2+4; 3+3; 4+2; 5+1	1+6; 2+5; 3+4; 4+3; 5+2; 6+1	2+6; 3+5; 4+4; 5+3; 6+2	3+6; 4+5; 5+4; 6+3	4+6; 5+5; 6+4	5+6; 6+5	6+6
Sicherman dice	1+1	2+1; 2+1	1+3; 3+1; 3+1	1+4; 2+3; 2+3; 4+1	1+5; 2+4; 2+4; 3+3; 3+3	1+6; 2+5; 2+5; 3+4; 3+4; 4+3	2+6; 2+6; 3+5; 3+5; 4+4	1+8; 3+6; 3+6; 4+5	2+8; 2+8; 4+6	3+8; 3+8	4+8

Double rolls are highlighted

Properties other than sum need not mimic regular dice; for example, the probability of rolling doubles is 1/6 with regular dice (1+1, 2+2, 3+3, 4+4, 5+5 and 6+6 out of 36 possible combinations), but 1/9 with Sicherman dice (1+1, 3+3, 3+3 and 4+4).

== History ==
The Sicherman dice were discovered by George Sicherman of Buffalo, New York and were originally reported by Martin Gardner in a 1978 article in Scientific American.

The numbers can be arranged so that all pairs of numbers on opposing sides sum to equal numbers, 5 for the first and 9 for the second.

Later, in a letter to Sicherman, Gardner mentioned that a magician he knew had anticipated Sicherman's discovery. For generalizations of the Sicherman dice to more than two dice and noncubical dice, see Broline (1979), Gallian and Rusin (1979), Brunson and Swift (1997/1998), and Fowler and Swift (1999).

== Mathematical justification ==
Let a canonical n-sided die be an n-hedron whose faces are marked with the integers [1,n] such that the probability of throwing each number is 1/n. Consider the canonical cubical (six-sided) die. The generating function for the throws of such a die is $x + x^2 + x^3 + x^4 + x^5 + x^6$. The product of this polynomial with itself yields the generating function for the throws of a pair of dice: $x^2 + 2 x^3 + 3 x^4 + 4 x^5 + 5 x^6 + 6 x^7 + 5 x^8 + 4 x^9 + 3 x^{10} + 2 x^{11} +x^{12}$.

We can analyze this polynomial using either cyclotomic polynomials, or elementary factoring.

Option 1: cyclotomic polynomials:

We know that:$x^n - 1 = \prod_{d\,\mid\,n} \Phi_d(x).$ where d ranges over the divisors of n and $\Phi_d(x)$ is the d-th cyclotomic polynomial, and

$$\frac{x^n -1}{x-1} = \sum_{i=0}^{n-1} x^i = 1 + x + \cdots + x^{n-1}$$.

We therefore derive the generating function of a single n-sided canonical die as being

$$x + x^2 + \cdots + x^n = \frac{x}{x-1} \prod_{d\,\mid\,n} \Phi_d(x)$$

$\Phi_1(x) = x - 1$ and is canceled. Thus the factorization of the generating function of a six-sided canonical die is

$$x\,\Phi_2(x)\,\Phi_3(x)\,\Phi_6(x) = x\;(x+1)\;(x^2 + x + 1)\;(x^2 - x +1)$$

Option 2: Elementary factoring:

$x + x^2 + x^3 + x^4 + x^5 + x^6 = x\frac{(x^6-1)}{x-1}$.

$x^6-1 = (x^3)^2 - 1 = (x^3-1)(x^3+1) = (x-1)(x^2+x+1)(x+1)(x^2-x+1)$.

Thus, $x + x^2 + x^3 + x^4 + x^5 + x^6 = x\frac{x^6-1}{x-1} = x(x+1)(x^2-x+1)(x^2+x+1).$

The generating function for the throws of two dice is the product of two copies of each of these factors: $(x(x+1)(x^2-x+1)(x^2+x+1))^2$. How can we partition them to form two legal dice whose pips are not arranged traditionally? Here legal means that the coefficients are non-negative and sum to six, so that each die has six sides and every face has at least one spot. That is, the generating function of each die must be a polynomial $p(x)$ with all positive exponents and no constant term (representing the die face values), and with positive coefficients (representing the number of faces showing each value) that sum to 6. So, $p(0) = 0$ and $p(1) = 6$.

Plugging in $x=1$ in the factors (to sum the coefficients) gives: $x+1 = 1+1=2$, $x^2+x+1 = 1+1+1=3$ and $x^2-x+1 = 1-1+1=1$. To make both products of factors equal to 6, each $x+1 = 2$ factor must be paired with $x^2+x+1 = 3$. The remaining pair of terms (both $x^2-x+1$) must either be separated (which gives the symmetrical solution, representing traditional dice), or be combined, representing Sicherman dice:

$$x\;(x + 1)\;(x^2 + x + 1) = x + 2x^2 + 2x^3 + x^4$$

and

$$x\;(x + 1)\;(x^2 + x + 1)\;(x^2 - x + 1)^2 = x + x^3 + x^4 + x^5 + x^6 + x^8$$

This gives us the distribution of pips on the faces of a pair of Sicherman dice as being {1,2,2,3,3,4} and {1,3,4,5,6,8}, as above.

This technique can be extended for dice with an arbitrary number of sides.

== See also ==
- Two-cube calendar
