= Antenen =

Antenen is a Swiss surname. Notable people with the surname include:

- Charles Antenen (1929–2000), Swiss footballer
- Georges Antenen (1903–1979), Swiss cyclist
- Meta Antenen (born 1949), Swiss pentathlete

== See also ==
- Antonen
