= Antoniu =

Antoniu is a given name and a surname. Notable people with this name include the following:

== Given name ==
- Antoniu Buci (born 1990), Romanian weightlifter
- Antoniu Vasile (born 1942), Romanian boxer

== Surname ==
- Costache Antoniu (1900–1979), Romanian actor
- Kristaq Antoniu, also known as Cristache Antoniu, (1907 – 1979), Romanian singer and actor

== See also ==
- Antoni
- Antonia
- Antonic
- Antonie
- Antonik
- Antonin
- Antonio
- Antonis
- Antonius
