= Antonee =

Antonee is a given name. Notable people with this name include the following:

- Antonee Burke-Gilroy (born 1997), English-born-Australian footballer
- Antonee Robinson (born 1997), American footballer

== See also ==
- Anhonee (disambiguation)
- Antone
- Antonie (given name)
- Antonen
