= Antonios Miliarakis =

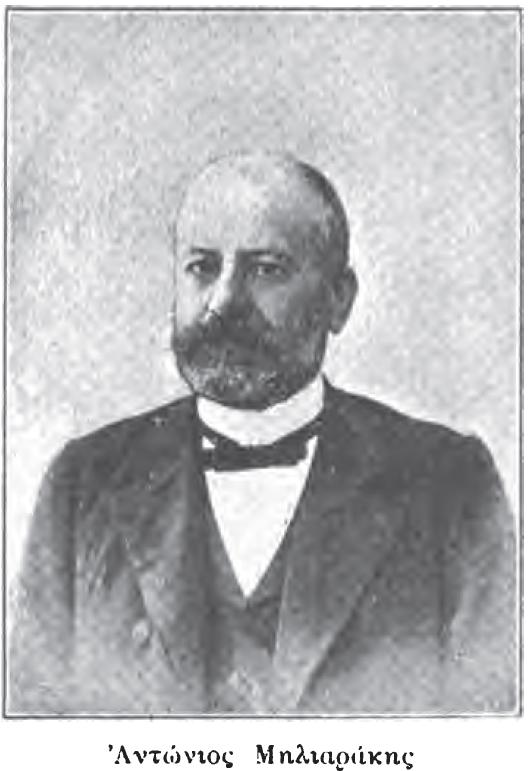
Antonios Miliarakis

Antonios Miliarakis (7 April 1841 – 8 April 1905) was a Greek geographer, academic and historian of the 19th century. He was distinguished for his studies in history and geography.

== Biographical information ==
He was born in Athens on 7 April 1841. He studied jurisprudence at the University of Athens and graduated in 1864. He worked as historian, geographer and professor of jurisprudence at the University of Athens whilst he was working as stenographer in Hellenic Parliament (since 1862), until his death.

The period from 1867 to 1868, Miliarakis served as secretary of the “Central Committee”, which was directing the Cretan Revolt that was in progress while in 1879 he participated in the trilateral commission that was sent from Greece to Preveza (then under Ottoman rule) to negotiate the determination of the new borders between the two states.

In 1882, he was one of the founding members of the Historical and Ethnological Society of Greece, in which he was curator and later secretary. His research work on historical and geographical issues was of great importance.

He died on April 8, 1905, in Athens where he was buried.

== Works ==
Miliarakis wrote a large number of history and geography books which are distinguished for the scientific methodology and the emphasis on historical, ethnological, demographic, cultural and folklore elements.

He was awarded by the “Society for the advancement of Hellenic studies” (“Σύλλογος προς προαγωγήν των ελληνικών σπουδών”) of Paris for three of his works; “Κυκλαδικά” (“Kykladika”) (1874), “Νεοελληνική γεωγραφική φιλολογία, ήτοι, κατάλογος των από του 1800-1889 γεωγραφηθέντων υπό Ελλήνων” (“Neohellenic geographical philology, catalogue of the geographical literature since 1800 until 1889 by Greeks”, 1889) and the “Ιστορία του βασιλείου της Νικαίας και του Δεσποτάτου της Ηπείρου” (“History of the Kingdom of Nicaea and the Despotate of Epirus”).

Antonios Miliarakis also wrote the following: «Υπομνήματα περιγραφικά των Κυκλάδων νήσων κατά μέρος» (“Descriptive memoranda of the Cyclades islands”) (1880, 1901), «Ολίγαι λέξεις περί της καταγωγής του Σκενδέρμπεη» (“A few words about the origin of Skanderbeg”) (1876) where he tried to refute the arguments of German historians about the Slavic origin of Skanderbeg, “Γεωγραφία Πολιτική Νέα και Αρχαία του Νομού Κεφαλληνίας” (“New and Ancient Political Geography of Kefallinia Prefecture”), etc.

== Sources ==
- Αικατερίνη Δερμιτζάκη (2013). The National and Historical Museum of the Historical and Ethnological Society of Greece: founding, collecting policy and other actions (1882-1926) (in Greek). Athens: Εθνικό και Καποδιστριακό Πανεπιστήμιο Αθηνών.
