= Anthonio =

Anthonio may refer to:

- A derivative of the given name Antonio
- "Anthonio" (song), by Annie
- Anthonio Hurdt, Dutch East India Company officer in Indonesia
- Fort Anthonio, a historical building in Tamsui
- Antonio Roque Gobbo, writer

== See also ==
- Anthoni, name
- Anthonij, given name
- Antonio, given name
