= Anthony Banua-Simon =

American documentary film director and editor

- Born: U.S.
- Occupation(s): Director, editor
- Years active: 2004–present

Anthony Banua-Simon is an American documentary film director and editor.

== Career ==
Anthony attended Evergreen State College and is currently a member of the Spectacle Theater. He directed a short documentary Third Shift, which won best documentary short at the Brooklyn Film Festival in 2014. In 2020, he directed his debut feature documentary Cane Fire, which premiered at the Hot Docs Canadian International Documentary Festival.

In 2021, Anthony was named in Filmmaker's "25 New Faces of Independent Film" and listed in DOC NYC's "40 Under 40" list for 2022.

== Selected filmography ==
Year	Title	Contribution	Note
2020	Cane Fire	Director and editor	Documentary
2018	Pure Flix and Chill: The David A.R. White Story	Director and editor	Documentary short
2014	Third Shift	Director and editor	Documentary short
2004	A Local Future	Director and editor	Short film

== Awards and nominations ==
Year	Result	Award	Category	Work	Ref.
2021	Won	Philadelphia Asian American Film Festival	Vijay Mohan Social Change Award	Cane Fire	
2021	Won	Los Angeles Asian Pacific Film Festival	Best Documentary Feature	Cane Fire	
2021	Won	DisOrient Film Festival	Jason D. Mak Award For Social Justice	Cane Fire	
2020	Won	Indie Memphis Film Festival	Best Documentary Feature	Cane Fire	
2014	Won	Brooklyn Film Festival	Best Documentary Short	Third Shift	
