= Anthonij Ewoud Jan Bertling =

Dutch politician

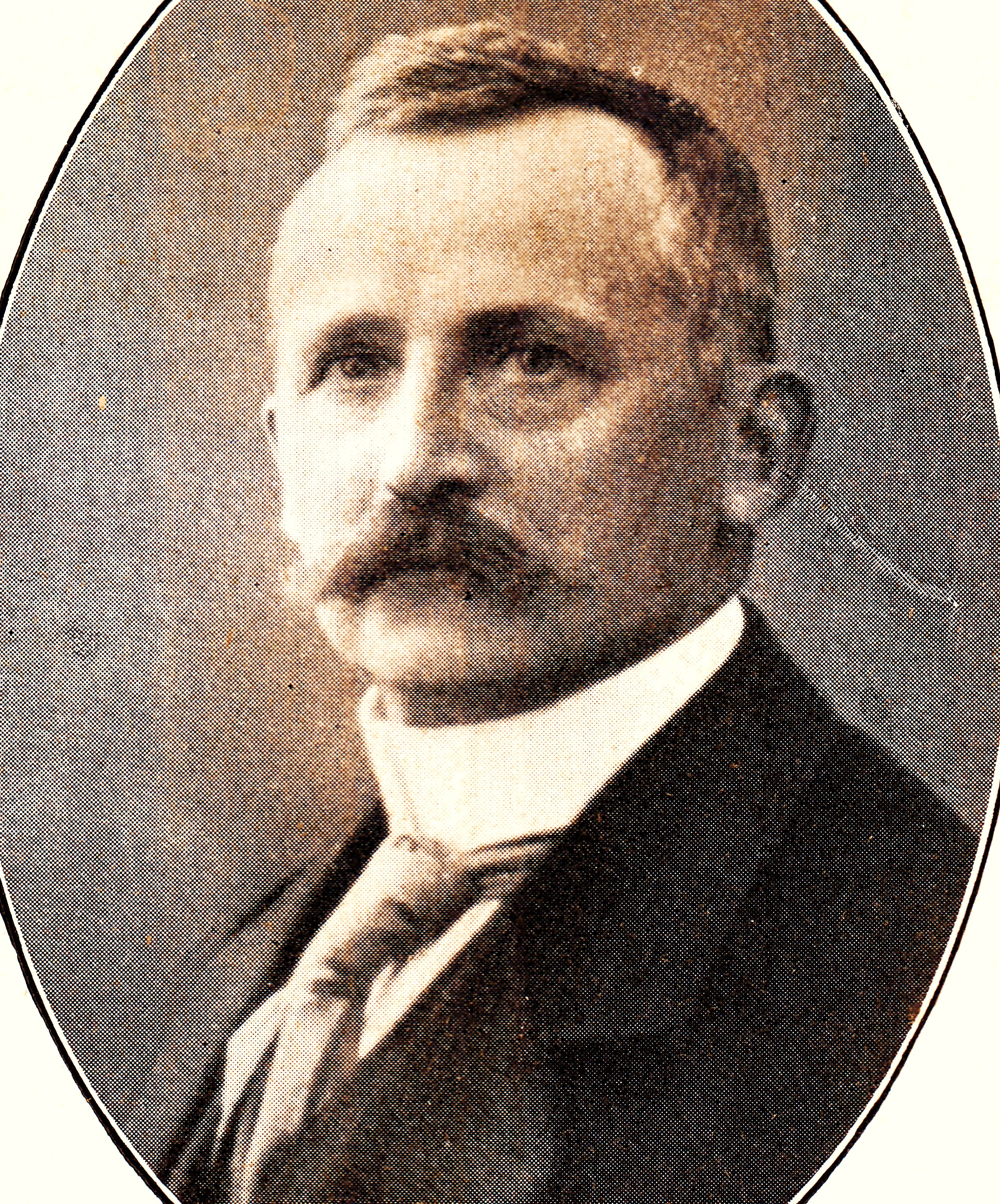
Anthonij Ewoud Jan Bertling.

Anthonij Ewoud Jan Bertling (13 December 1860, Assen – 2 February 1945, Hilversum) was a Dutch politician.

== Links ==
- Profile
