= Michael Anthony =

Michael Anthony may refer to:

- Michael Anthony (actor), American actor and musician
- Michael Anthony (author) (1930–2023), Caribbean author and historian
- Michael Anthony (boxer) (born 1957), boxer from Guyana
- Michael Anthony (musician) (born 1954), former bassist for the rock band Van Halen
- Michael C. Anthony, American stage hypnotist
- Michael A. Anthony (born 1950), member of the South Carolina House of Representatives
- Michael Anthony, a recurring fictional character in the American television series The Millionaire
- Mike Anthony (singer), British lovers rock singer
- Michael Anthony (chef) (born 1968), American chef
