= Nathan Antonik =

Australian rugby league footballer

Personal information
- Full name: Nathan Antonik
- Born: 29 September 1975 (age 50) Nambour, Queensland, Australia

Playing information
- Position: Hooker, Halfback
Club
Years	Team	Pld	T	G	FG	P
1996–97	South Queensland	20	0	1	0	2
2000–01	Keighley	25	13	1	0	54
	Total	45	13	2	0	56
- Source: As of 22 November 2023

Nathan Antonik is an Australian former professional rugby league footballer who played in the 1990s and 2000s. He played for South Queensland in the ARL competition and for Keighley in England. He is of Russian heritage.

== Playing career ==
Antonik played his junior rugby league with the Runaway Bay Seagulls. Antonik made his first grade debut for South Queensland in round 20 of the 1996 ARL season against St. George. In the 1997 ARL season, Antonik played 19 games alternating between halfback and hooker as the South Queensland side finished with the Wooden Spoon for a second consecutive year. Following the liquidation of the club, Antonik was without a team but quickly signed for St. George however he did not make any first grade appearances for the club. In 2000, Antonik moved to England and played two seasons with second division side Keighley.
