= Antonios Zavaliangos =

American material scientist and engineer

Antonios Zavaliangos is an American material scientist and engineer, and currently the A. W. Grosvenor professor at Drexel University. He is also a published author.

Zavaliangos is also the Director of the CMSE Graduate Assistance in Areas of National Need, Director of GAANN-Pharma, and Co-Director of the Drexel Research Experiences in Advanced Materials NSF REU Site.

As of 9/9/2026 Zavaliangos has an h-index of 41 and his publications have been cited 7274 times according to Google Scholar and his is on the World's Top 2% Scientists based on both career and single Year (2025) data
