= Markos Antonios Katsaitis =

Markos Antonios Katsaitis (Μάρκος-Αντώνιος Κατσάϊτις)
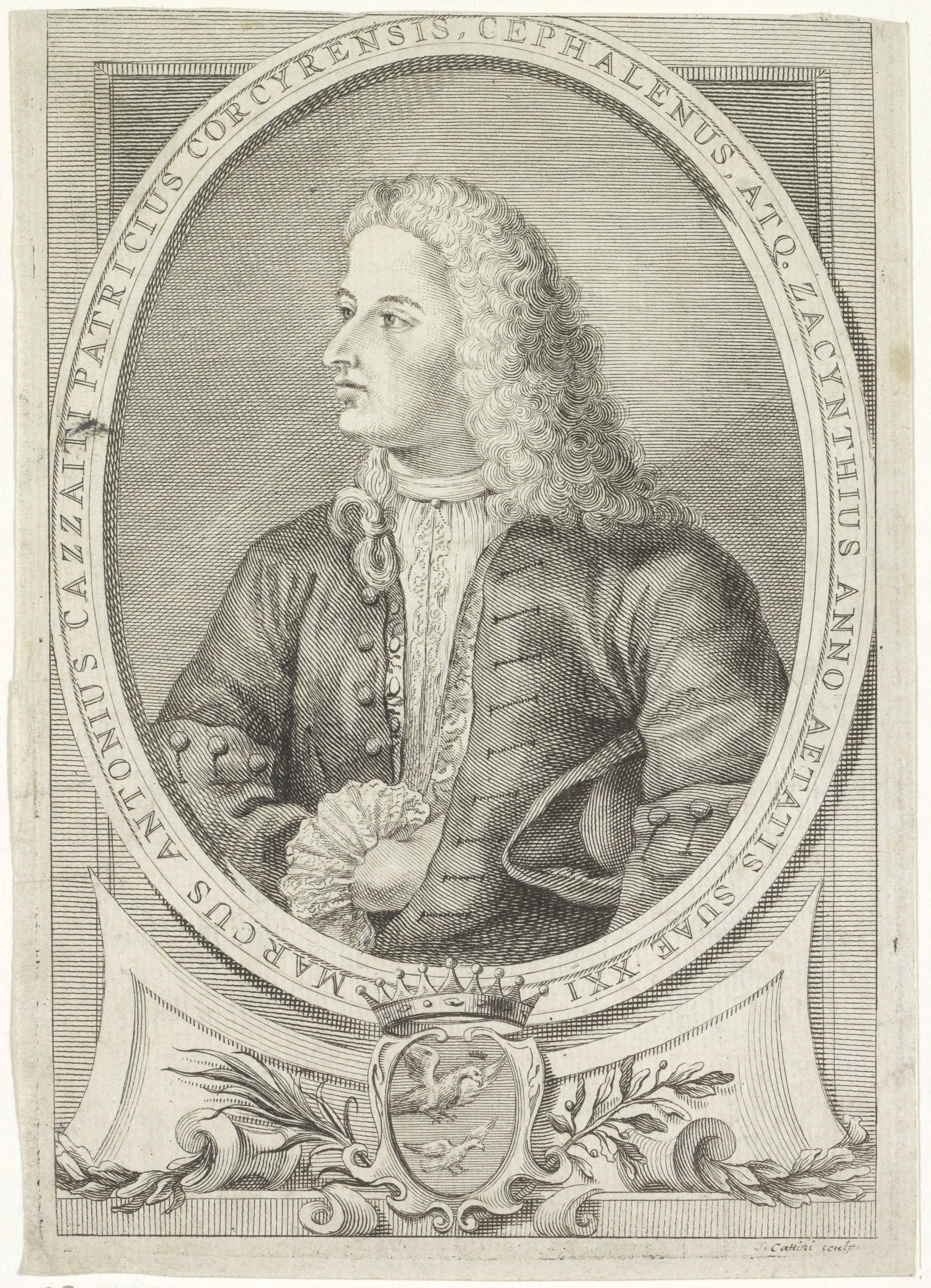
- A portrait of Markos Antonios Katsaitis
- Born: Markos Antonios Katsaitis (Μάρκος-Αντώνιος Κατσάϊτις); 1717; Corfu, Republic of Venice
- Died: 1787 (aged 69–70); Athens, Ottoman Greece
- Occupations: Scholar, lawyer, geographer
- Writing career
- Genres: Greek literature, Law and Geography

Markos Antonios Katsaitis (Greek: Μάρκος-Αντώνιος Κατσάϊτις, Italian: Marco Antonio Cazzaiti, Latin: Marcus Antonius Cazzaiti, French: Marc-Antoine Cazzaiti, 1717 – 1787) was an 18th-century Greek scholar, geographer and lawyer.

== Biography ==
Markos Antonios Katsaitis was a Greek who was born on the Ionian island of Corfu in 1717 to a noble family. In his early adolescence he moved to Constantinople where he lived for several years. He became associated with the Phanariotes, a Greek elite based in the Fanar district of Constantinople. Katsaitis travelled to Moldavia and Wallachia from Constantinople in 1742 to meet and secure an audience with the prince of Wallachia Constantine Mavrocordatos (1711–1769). He traveled to Wallachia with the entourage of the Wallachian rulers son Constantin Cantemir. During his travel through the Balkans, Katsaitis documented his travels in a detailed diary. When he finally reached Wallachia he met Mavrokordatos who accepted Katsaitis, the young nobleman into his Court.

== See also ==
- Byzantine scholars in Renaissance
