= Antonis Vratsanos =

- Born: 1919; Larissa
- Died: November 25, 2008; Athens

Antonis Vratsanos (Aggeloulis) (Greek: Αντώνης Βρατσάνος (Αγγελούλης), 1919 in Larissa – November 25, 2008 in Athens), was a saboteur of the Greek People's Liberation Army (ELAS), the military branch of the National Liberation Front (EAM) during the Axis Occupation of Greece, and of the Democratic Army of Greece during the Greek Civil War.

Born in Larissa in 1919, he fought in the Greco-Italian War as a Reserve 2nd Lieutenant of Engineers. With the onset of the Occupation, he joined the EAM-ELAS, rising to become commander of the Olympus Engineers Battalion, with which he was engaged in numerous sabotage acts against the railway network used by the occupation forces.

During the subsequent civil war of 1946–49, he led a saboteur brigade of the communist Democratic Army of Greece. Following the communists' defeat, he went to exile in Tashkent and Romania.

On February 28, 2007, he was awarded by the President of the Hellenic Republic, Karolos Papoulias, the "Grand Commander of the Order of Honor" for his actions in the Greek Resistance in the years 1941–44.
