= Antonie Stemmler =

German teacher, nurse and antifascist resistance member

- Born: 6 November 1892; Hilterfingen, Switzerland
- Died: 8 May 1976 (aged 83); Kleinmachnow, East Germany
- Other names: Antonia Altenmuler, Toni Stemmler
- Occupations: teacher, nurse
- Years active: 1916–1965
- Spouse: Ernst Goldstein
- Awards: Clara Zetkin Medal (1966); Patriotic Order of Merit (1967); Florence Nightingale Medal (1967)

Antonie Stemmler (also Toni Stemmler, 6 November 1892 – 8 May 1976) was a German teacher, nurse and member of the antifascist resistance. In 1967 she received the Florence Nightingale Medal to honor her work in Nazi concentration camps during World War II and her nursing activities during the Spanish Civil War. In later life she was the only woman ever to chair the Zauch-Belziger District Council and when administrative reform dissolved the council, she became the first chair of the Council of the District of Potsdam. She received both the Clara Zetkin Medal and the Patriotic Order of Merit from East Germany.

== Early life ==
Antonie Stemmler was born on 6 November 1892 in Hilterfingen, Switzerland. When she was two years old, her family returned to Potsdam, Germany, her father's homeland. After completing her secondary education, she attended a normal school to attain certification as a teacher.

== Career ==
In 1916, Stemmler began teaching at a primary school in Berlin-Moabit and simultaneously worked in the archive of the Association of German Mechanical Engineering Institutions. Between 1929 and 1931, she was employed as a secretary at the publishing house run by Rudolf Mosse. She worked in the foreign correspondence department and became aware of international politics. Joining the communist party in 1932, she began co-editing the journal Roter Westen (Red West), but was arrested after Hitler's rise to power in 1933. After a short confinement in prison, she emigrated to Prague, Czechoslovakia, where she began working at the Arbeiterverlag (Workers' Publishing House), editing anti-fascist material. In January 1936, she was arrested a second time and lost her right to reside as an asylee in Czechoslovakia. Stemmler moved to Paris and found employment at the publisher United, where she worked until 1937.

That year in July, Stemmler moved to Spain with her husband, Ernst Goldstein. She began working as a nurse in the International Brigades of the Spanish Civil War at the medical center set up in Murcia. Goldstein engaged in the combat units of the brigades and was killed during the conflict. She worked near the front at field hospitals in Barcelona, Magoria, and Murcia until the war ended in March 1939. Making her way back to France, after crossing the border, she was interned with other German refugees from Spain in the Gurs internment camp near Pau. In 1941, Stemmler was handed over to the Gestapo and transported to Ravensbrück concentration camp, where as a prisoner, she served as a nurse and saved the lives of two Czech prisoners. She remained until her transfer in 1943 to the camp at Auschwitz. Without regard for her own safety, Stemmler used her medical training to treat patients who were suffering from illness or had been subjected to medical experimentation by the Nazis. She was evacuated in 1945 as part of a death march from the camp and was eventually liberated in April by the Red Army.

Stemmler began working at the Eberswalde Upper District Office in the Soviet occupation zone in August 1945. After two years, she began working at Landessender Potsdam editing women's content for the radio. Simultaneously, she served as a trustee for the sawmill in Biesenthal. In 1950, Stemmler began working at the Municipal Communication Archive in Schwielowsee and at the end of that year was asked by the Socialist Unity Party of Germany (German: Sozialistische Einheitspartei Deutschlands, SED) to take over the chair of the Zauch-Belzig District Council. She accepted the appointment and was officially elected unanimously as the district administrator on 28 December 1950. Stemmler was the only woman ever to hold the chair on the council, as in 1952 an administrative reorganization dissolved the Zauch-Belziger District Council, replacing it with the Council of the District of Potsdam, for which she served as the inaugural chair. During her terms, she was known for her strict adherence to the party ideology. After a heart attack in 1953, she resigned the post as council chair.

Though Stemmler retired from politics, she remained active in the East German Red Cross and worked as a secretary of the East German Writers' Association in Berlin until 1961. In November 1961, she was elected to serve a four year post on the town council of Kleinmachnow. Early in February 1962, she agreed to act as interim mayor for two months because Otto Bachmann, the elected mayor was ill. Her term as acting mayor was extended and she held the post until March 1963. Stemmler was honored with the Clara Zetkin Medal in 1966 and the following year received the silver Patriotic Order of Merit from East Germany. In 1967, at a ceremony held at the Zwinger Palace in Dresden, she was honored with the Florence Nightingale Medal for her service as a volunteer military nurse.

== Death and legacy ==
Stemmler died on 8 May 1976 in Kleinmachnow, East Germany. She was buried in the New Memorial Cemetery of Potsdam. In the 1970s, a combined nursery and kindergarten in Potsdam-West was named in her honor, recognizing her efforts in anti-fascist activities directed at youth. The facility operated until 2007, when the building required rehabilitation. In 1989, the Toni Stemmler Retirement Home was opened in Bad Belzig by the Health Department of the District Council. At the time, residential care for the elderly was a relatively new concept. The home was refurbished and brought up to modern standards in 2004, housing 80 residents.
