= Borislav Antonić =

Serbian politician

Borislav Antonić (Serbian Cyrillic: Борислав Антонић; born 23 February 1964) is a politician in Serbia. He was the mayor of Bač from 2017 to 2020 and has served in the Assembly of Vojvodina since 2020. Antonić is a member of the Serbian Progressive Party.

== Private career ==
Antonić was born in Bač, Vojvodina, in what was then the Socialist Republic of Serbia in the Socialist Federal Republic of Yugoslavia. He is a legal technician.

== Politician ==
=== Municipal politics ===
Antonić entered political life as a member of the far-right Serbian Radical Party. He received the second position on the party's electoral list for Bač in the 2012 Serbian local elections and was elected when the list won two mandates. He was also given the fortieth position on the party's list concurrent 2012 Vojvodina provincial election; the party won only five seats, and he was not returned. At some time after the 2012 election, he left the Radicals and joined the Progressive Party. He was selected as president (i.e., speaker) of the local assembly following a change in government in May 2014.

Antonić was given the second position on the Progressive Party's list for Bač in the 2016 local elections and was re-elected when the list won a plurality victory with eleven out of twenty-five mandates. He was initially selected for another term as assembly president following the election, and fellow party member Dragan Stašević was chosen as mayor. On 10 October 2017, Stašević resigned and Antonić was selected as mayor in his place. He remained in office for three years and did not seek re-election at the municipal level in 2020.

=== Assembly of Vojvodina ===
Antonić received the forty-eighth position on the Progressive Party's Aleksandar Vučić — For Our Children list in the 2020 provincial election and was elected when the list won a majority victory with seventy-six out of 120 mandates. In October 2020, he was selected as president of the committee for establishing the equal authenticity of provincial legislation in the languages in official use. He is also a member of the committee on national equality.
