= Colin Antonie =

Australian rules footballer

Personal information
- Full name: Colin Lawrence Antonie
- Born: 26 March 1952
- Died: 6 March 2017 (aged 64)
- Original team: Cheltenham
- Height: 188 cm (6 ft 2 in)
- Weight: 80 kg (176 lb)
- Position: Defence

Playing career^{1}
Years	Club	Games (Goals)
1969–71	St Kilda	17 (7)
- ^{1} Playing statistics correct to the end of 1971.

Colin Lawrence Antonie (26 March 1952 – 6 March 2017) was an Australian rules footballer who played with St Kilda in the Victorian Football League (VFL).
