= Antonie Strassmann =

German stage actress and aviator

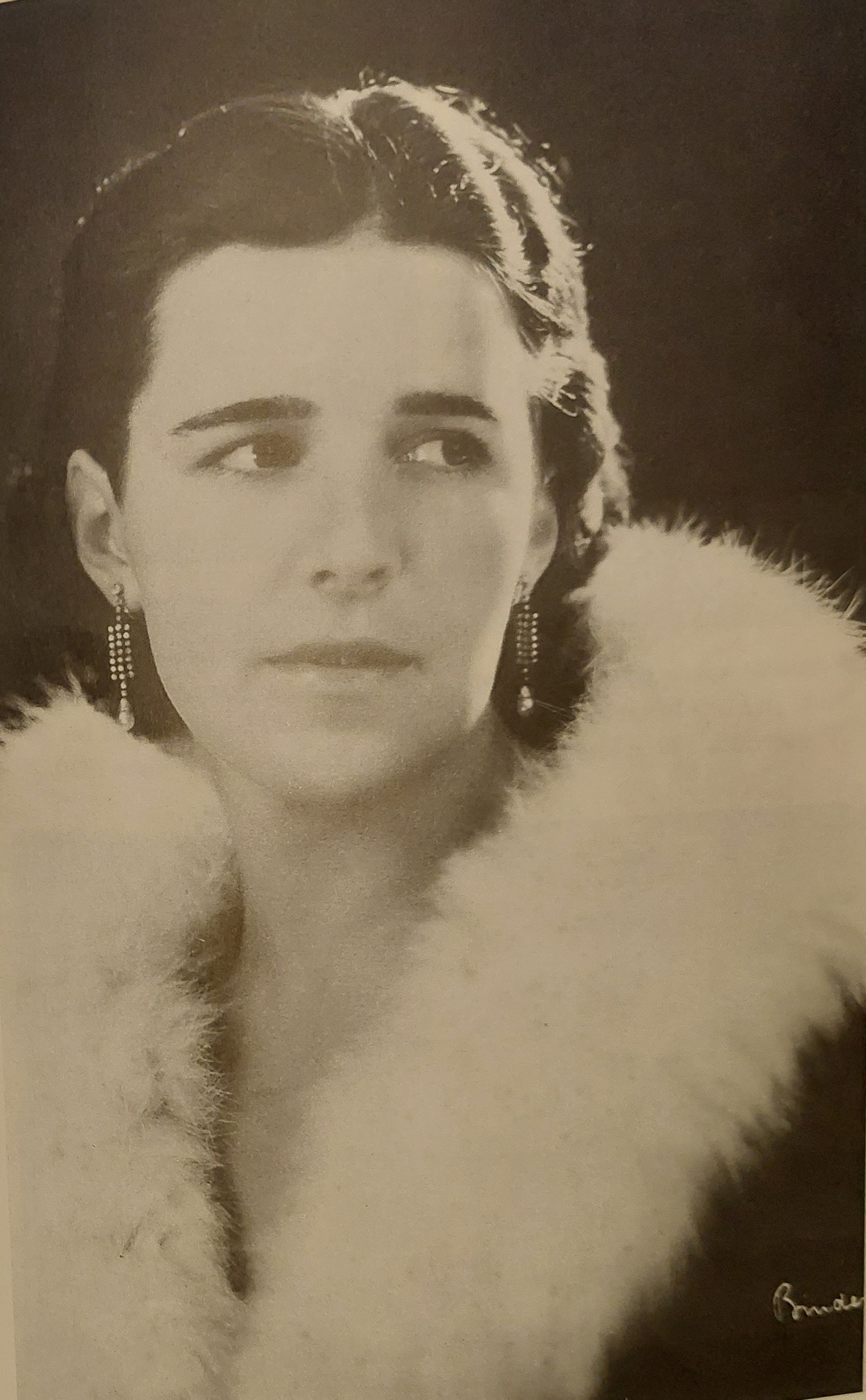
- Born: 1901; Berlin
- Died: January 1952; New York City
- Occupations: actress; aviator; manager

Antonie Strassmann (1901–1952) was a German stage actress and aviator. She emigrated to the United States and worked as an aviation consultant prior to World War II.

== Early years ==
Strassmann was born in Berlin, Germany, in 1901 to Paul and Hedwig Strassmann, Christians of Jewish descent. At the age of 16 she decided to become an actress, although her parents did not approve, stating that acting was an "undignified" career. In the 1920s she performed on stage both in Germany and overseas, including the role of Puck in A Midsummer Night's Dream, and in productions of Die Fledermaus and Moreto's opera Donna Diana. In 1920, Strassmann won the role of Judith in the play Judith und Holofernes, performing opposite Paul Wegener in the city of Magdeburg. The following year, she was offered a contract with the State Theatre of Stuttgart. In 1928, Strassmann joined Wegener's troupe and toured Eastern Europe with them for two years. However, from 1930 the Great Depression was having an effect on the entertainment industry, and Strassmann retired from acting due to a lack of work.

Strassmann was also an accomplished athlete, excelling in running, swimming, boxing and cycling.

== Career ==
Strassmann first experienced flight on hot air balloon trips with her brother and cousin in 1925, and then on flying trips with a friend in 1926. In September 1927, Strassman began flying lessons at the Boornemann school in Staaken, earning her pilot license in 1928, and then moved on to learn aerobatic flying at Würzburg. However, she realised that earning an income from aviation would be difficult as women were barred from working as commercial pilots, and money from exhibition flying was insufficient for a stable income. Instead, in 1930, she made a proposal to the German Foreign Office to organise and manage a year-long touring exhibition of model and full-sized German aircraft in the United States. Her aims were to advertise German business and encourage positive German-U.S. relations. She developed agreements with the Model Airplane League of America and the Gimbel Company, and planned an itinerary to visit 12 cities. The proposal was accepted and the exhibition began in spring 1930. Strassmann and her friend, pilot Koenig-von Warthausen, delivered lectures on German aviation and performed aerobatic flights, participated in air shows, visited aviation companies and gave interviews to the press. At the National Air Races in Chicago in 1930, she was invited to test 28 types of airplanes. The German Foreign Office declared the tour an absolute success, and on her return to Germany Strassmann was considered a major expert on the field of aviation, and invited to educate German industrialists and politicians, including Ernst Heinkel, Claude Dornier, Hugo Junkers, and Hugo Eckener.

In May 1932 Strassmann became the first woman to successfully cross the Atlantic Ocean aboard an aircraft, travelling on a Dornier Do X flying boat. In autumn 1932, Strassmann piloted her last big flight. She left Germany on board a Zeppelin, with a dismantled Klemm sports plane in the cargo hold, and travelled to Pernambuco in Brazil. From there, she completed a marketing tour through South America for the Klemm sports aircraft company, with stops and flight performances in Recife, Bahia, Rio de Janeiro, São Paulo, and Buenos Aires. Also in 1932, Strassmann emigrated to the United States, stating that she loved the stimulation and opportunities of the country. She studied business administration in New York and began to work as a business consultant for German aviation companies such as Junkers, Bavarian Aircraft Company, Heinkel, Stinnes, Hapag, Focke-Wulf, Klemm and Lufthansa, negotiating sales contracts on their behalf with U.S. companies such as Bendix, Budd, Glenn L. Martin, General Tire and Goodyear.

With the outbreak of World War II, Strassmann's work as an aviation consultant ended. She moved to Westchester County, New York, and worked for the American Red Cross as a driver and a first-aid instructor. Later she took a job with the Delahanty Institute training new workers in interpreting blueprints and operating metalworking equipment. In 1943 an old friend offered her a management position running a sales office for the hearing aid division of Zenith Radio Corporation in New York City.

Strassmann died of cancer in January 1952 in New York City.

== Personal life ==
Strassmann was married to a German curtain manufacturer, Willy Joseph, from January 1923 until their divorce in 1925. She was then involved with a former Crown Prince, Wilhelm von Hohenzollern, for a year, and later had a relationship with the Austrian actor Rudolf Forster followed by the exhibition pilot Ernst Udet. In the 1930s Strassmann had a relationship with Robert L. Hague, senior vice president of Standard Oil Company, until his death in 1939.
