= Anthonie Waldorp =

Dutch painter

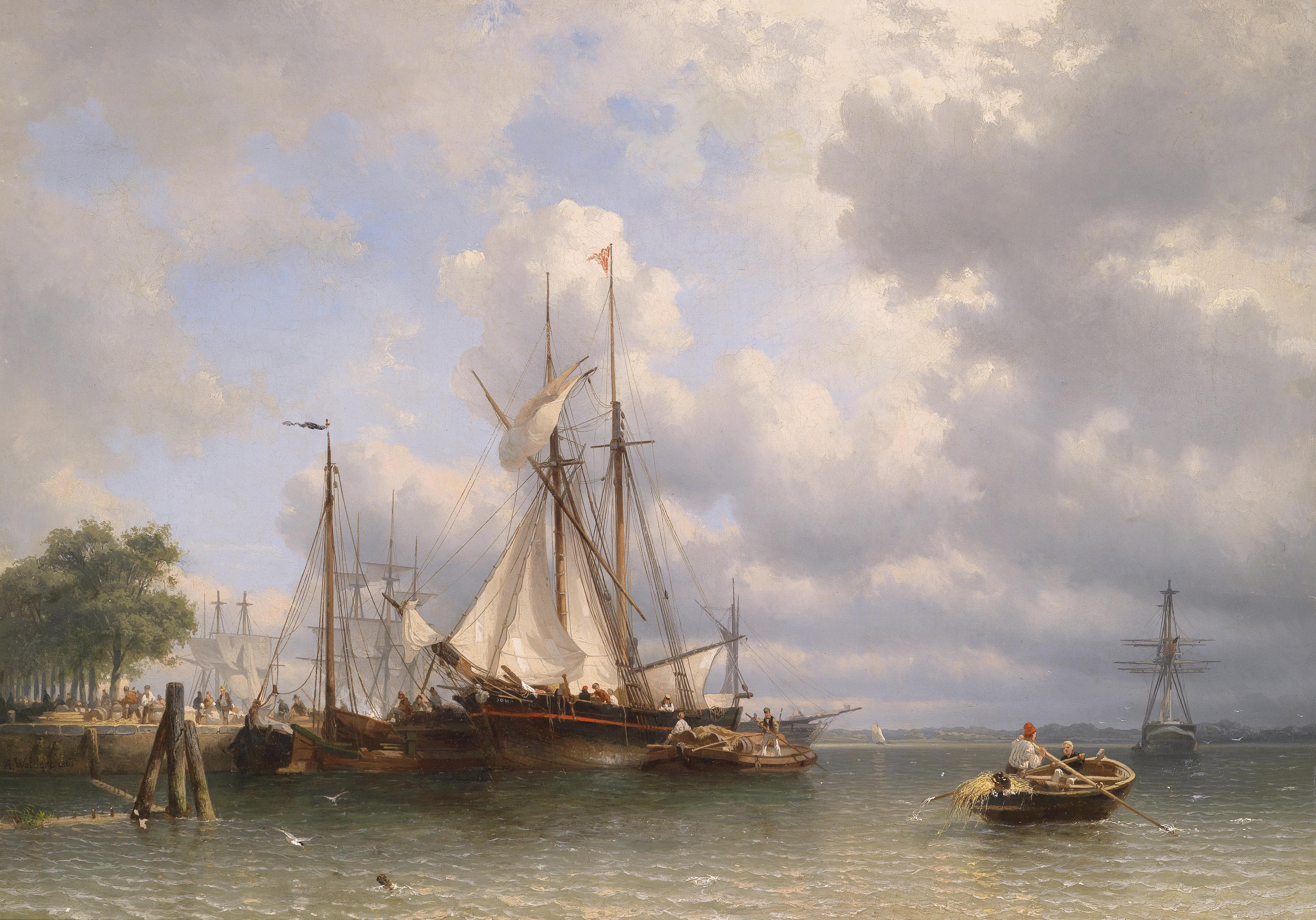
Anthonie Waldorp, Sailing ships in the harbor, 1862, Oil on canvas.

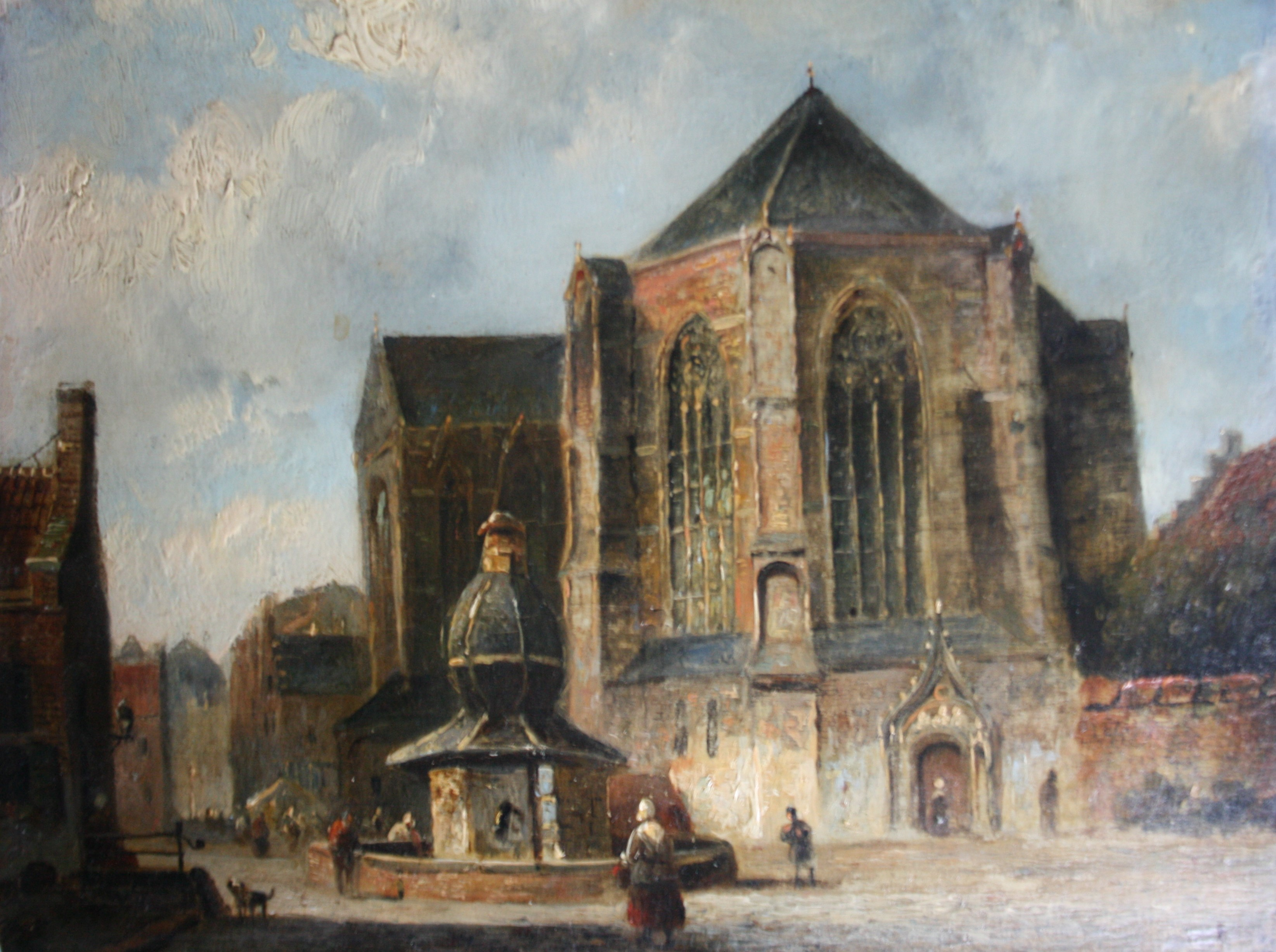
View of a town

Anthonie Waldorp, or Antoine de Saaijer Waldorp (The Hague, 28 March 1803 – Amsterdam, 12 October 1866) was a Dutch painter and a forerunner of the Hague School.

== Life and work ==
Anthonie Waldorp was the son of Abel de Saaijer Waldorp and Jacomina Goddé, and the grandson of Jan Gerard Waldor, who was superintendent of the National Art Gallery. On February 25, 1824, he married Johanna Sophia Waldorp van Hove. At the wedding in The Hague there was a clerical error in the marital attachments, mistakenly registering Anthonie as Anthonie Waldorp instead of Saaijer Waldorp.

Shortly after his 23rd birthday, Anthonie decides to follow a career as a painter and became one of the precursors of the Hague School. Anthonie took an apprenticeship with the well-known stage scenery painter Joannes Breckenheimer, Jr. (1772–1856) in The Hague, who was also the tutor of the well-known painter Andreas Schelfhout.

Anthonie started painting stage sceneries like his grandfather. Later he focused on domestic and church interiors and portraits (people in 17th-century costumes). Finally he specialized in landscapes, river and seascapes (paintings, drawings and water colors). It proved to be a wise decision as it led to international recognition. He also did some lithographic work. In 1833, together with Wijnand Nuyen, he traveled through France, Belgium and Germany and became the tutor of C.P. 't Hoen, J.C. Hofman, C. Rochussen and Jan Hendrik Weissenbruch. Many of his paintings were bought by German, Dutch and French kings.

Until 1857 he lived in The Hague, after which he settled in Amsterdam, where he joined the Royal Academy. He received several awards: in 1845 Waldorp was appointed Knight of the Order of Leopold by the Belgian king, Knight in the Order of the Dutch Lion in 1847 by King William II and Knight in the Order of the Oak Crown in 1849 by William.

In The Hague and Amsterdam there are streets named after Anthonie Waldorp.

== Sources ==
- Dutch Wikipedia Article
- The Waldorp Project

== Works ==
- Works at artrenewal.org
- Works at Christies
