= Antone =

Antone is both a surname and a masculine given name. Notable people with the name include:

Surname:

- Annie Antone (born 1955), American basket weaver
- Bruce Antone (born 1960), American politician
- Clifford Antone (1949–2006), American blues musician
- Steve Antone (1921–2014), American politician

Given name:

- Antone "Tony" Costa (1944–1974), American serial killer
- Antone Davis (born 1967), American football player
- Antone Smith (born 1985), American football player
- Antone Williamson (born 1973), American baseball player

== See also ==
- Antona (name)
- Antono (name)
- Antone, Oregon, former community in Wheeler County, Oregon, United States
- Antonee
- Antonen
