= Anna Berentine Anthoni =

Norwegian trade unionist and politician

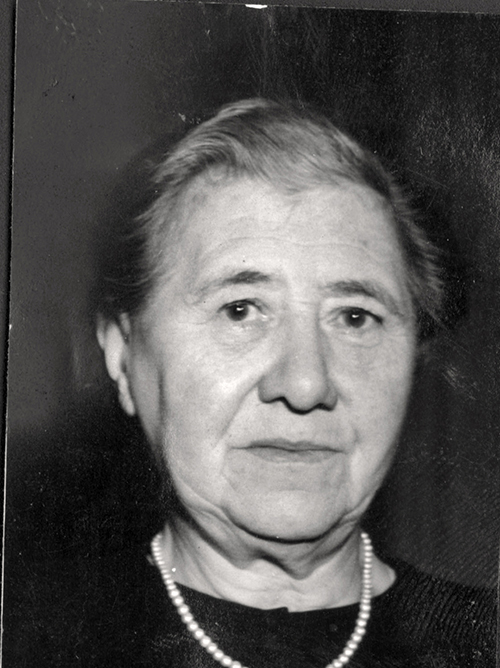
Image of Anna Anthoni

Anna Berentine Anthoni (18 May 1884 – 4 March 1951) was a Norwegian trade unionist and politician for the Labour Party.

She was born in Bergen, and had her first job at a curtain factory from 1901 to 1905. From 1906 to 1910 she was a captain in the Salvation Army. She then spent several years in the city Horten, where she managed a retirement home from 1919 to 1925. She then returned to Bergen, worked two years in the textile industry before becoming fully involved in the trade union Norsk Tekstilarbeiderforbund. The trade union would become a part of Bekledningsarbeiderforbundet in 1969 and the United Federation of Trade Unions in 1988.

She was a member of the executive committee of Bergen city council from 1934 to 1951. She was also a deputy representative to the Parliament of Norway, representing the constituency Bergen, during the terms 1937–1945 and 1950–1953. In 1950 she gained a regular seat in parliament, since Nils Langhelle had become a member of Gerhardsen's Second Cabinet. She held this position until her death on 4 March 1951.
