= Tony Anthony (disambiguation) =

Tony Anthony (born 1960) is an American wrestler.

Tony Anthony may also refer to:

- Tony Anthony (actor) (born 1937), American actor and director
- Tony Anthony (evangelist) (born 1971), British evangelist

== See also ==
- Anthony Anthony
