= Julie Anthony =

Julie Anthony may refer to:

- Julie Anthony (singer) (born 1949), Australian soprano
- Julie Anthony (tennis) (born 1948), American tennis player
