= David Anthony =

David Anthony may refer to:

- David Anthony (wheelchair rugby) (born 1981), British wheelchair rugby athlete
- David Anthony (politician) (born 1955), member of the Michigan House of Representatives
- David Brynmor Anthony (1886–1966), teacher and academic administrator
- David W. Anthony (fl. 1987–), American anthropologist

== See also ==
- Anthony David (disambiguation)
