= Gary Antonick =

American journalist and recreational mathematician

Gary Antonick (/ˈæntənɪk/ AN-tə-nik; born February 11, 1963) is an American journalist and recreational mathematician who for many years wrote a puzzle-based column called "Numberplay" for the New York Times.

== Education and career ==
Antonick has a BS in Engineering from the University of Michigan and an MBA from Harvard Business School. In 2019, he taught a course at Stanford University, titled Math in the Wild: Using Mathematical Thinking to Solve Messy Real-World Problems, alongside Keith Devlin.

== Numberplay ==
From December 2009 to October 2016 Antonick wrote the puzzle themed "Numberplay" column for The New York Times. The puzzles generally involved math or logic problems. They came from many sources, and many were descended from columns by the celebrated Scientific American columnist Martin Gardner. He often wrote about Gardner and considered him to be the leading popularizer of recreational mathematics. Conferences called Gathering 4 Gardner are held every two years to celebrate Gardner's legacy, and Antonick has twice spoken at these events. He also supports the Julia Robinson Mathematics Festival.

Among the many classic problems of recreational mathematics featured in "Numberplay" are The Prisoner's Dilemma, The Two Child Problem, The Monty Hall Problem, The Monkey and the Coconuts, The Two-cube Calendar, and The Zebra Puzzle. Sometimes "Numberplay" was used to celebrate other mathematicians such as Paul Erdős, or simply to report a breakthrough in mathematics or game theory.

"Numberplay" columns led to five sequences originated by Antonick being listed in the On-Line Encyclopedia of Integer Sequences (OEIS)

== English Channel Swim ==
On August 8, 1988, Antonick swam the English Channel, starting from Dover, England, and finishing in France 8 hours and 46 minutes later.
