= Antonis Fotiadis =

Greek footballer

Antonis Fotiadis (Greek: Αντώνης Φωτιάδης; born 1899, date of death unknown) was a Greek football player who played for the clubs Apollon in Smyrna, and later for Panionios in Athens, following the Greco-Turkish war between 1919 and 1922. He played for the national team in the 1920 Olympic Games in Antwerp.
