= Charles Anthony =

Charles Anthony may refer to:

- Charles Anthony (American football) (born 1952), American football player
- Charles Anthony (tenor) (1929–2012), opera singer
- Charles Lucas Anthony (1960–1983), one of the commanders of the LTTE rebel group in Sri Lanka
- Charles Anthony, Prince of Hohenzollern (1811–1885), Prime Minister of Prussia
- Charles Anthony (politician) (1798–1862), American politician, businessman, and Mason
