= Sean Anthony =

Sean Anthony may refer to:

- Sean Anthony (basketball) (born 1986), Filipino-Canadian basketball player
- Sean Anthony (rapper) (born 1982), American rapper
- Sean Anthony (historian) (born 1979), American historian of early Islam
