= Anthon (surname) =

Anthon is a surname. It derived from the Antonius root name. Notable people with the surname include:

- Charles Anthon (1797–1867), American classical scholar
- Georg David Anthon (1714 – 1781), Danish architect
- John Anthon (1784–1863), American jurist
- Kelly Anthon (born 1974), American politician
- Marion Graves Anthon Fish (1853–1915), American socialite
- Marx Anthon (died 1537), Max executed in Zurich for homosexuality

== See also ==
- Anthon (given name)
- Anthoni, name
- Antoon
