= Antony Duff (philosopher) =

British philosopher

Antony Duff FRSE FBA
- Born: 1945 (age 80–81)

Education
- Education: Oxford University

Philosophical work
- Era: 21st-century philosophy
- Region: Western philosophy
- Institutions: University of Stirling, University of Minnesota
- Main interests: philosophy of law, punishment

Antony Duff also known as R. A. Duff FRSE FBA (born 1945) is a British philosopher and Professor Emeritus at the University of Stirling. He is known for his works on philosophy of law.

== Books ==
- Criminalization: The Political Morality of the Criminal Law (Oxford University Press, 2014) (edited with Lindsay Farmer, S.E. Marshall, Massimo Renzo and Victor Tadros)
- The Constitution of the Criminal Law (Oxford University Press, 2013) (edited with Lindsay Farmer, S.E. Marshall, Massimo Renzo and Victor Tadros)
- The Structures of the Criminal Law (Oxford University Press, 2012) (edited with Lindsay Farmer, S.E. Marshall, Massimo Renzo and Victor Tadros)
- Philosophical Foundations of Criminal Law (Oxford University Press, 2011) (edited with Stuart P. Green)
- The Boundaries of the Criminal Law (Oxford University Press, 2010) (edited with Lindsay Farmer, S.E. Marshall, Massimo Renzo and Victor Tadros)
- Answering for Crime: Responsibility and Liability in the Criminal Law (Hart Publishing, 2007)
- The Trial on Trial: Volume Three: Towards a Normative Theory of the Criminal Trial (Hart Publishing, 2007) (with Lindsay Farmer,Sandra Marshall and Victor Tadros)
- Privacy and the Criminal Law (Intersentia, 2006) (edited with Erik Claes and Serge Gutwirth)
- The Trial on Trial: Volume Two: Judgment and Calling to Account (Hart Publishing, 2006) (edited with Lindsay Farmer, Sandra Marshall and Victor Tadros)
- Defining Crimes: Essays on the Special Part of the Criminal Law (Oxford University Press, 2005) (edited with Stuart P. Green)
- The Trial on Trial: Volume One: Truth and Due Process (Hart Publishing, 2004) (edited with Lindsay Farmer, Sandra Marshall and Victor Tadros)
- Punishing Juveniles: Principle and Critique (Hart Publishing, 2002) (edited with Ido Weijers)
- Punishment, Communication, and Community (Oxford University Press, 2001)
- Philosophy and the Criminal Law: Principle and Critique (Cambridge University Press, 1998) (editor)
- Criminal Attempts (Clarendon Press, 1996)
- A Reader on Punishment (Oxford University Press, 1994) (edited with David Garland)
- Penal Theory and Practice: Tradition and Innovation in Criminal Justice (Manchester University Press, 1994) (edited with Sandra Marshall, Rebecca Emerson Dobash and Russell P. Dobash)
- Punishment (Dartmouth, 1993) (editor)
- Intention, Agency, and Criminal Liability: Philosophy of Action and the Criminal Law (Blackwell, 1990)
- Trials and Punishments (Cambridge University Press, 1986)
- Philosophy and the Criminal Law (Franz Steiner, 1984) (edited with N.E. Simmonds)
