= James C. Anthony =

American epidemiologist

James C. (Jim) Anthony has been professor in the Department of Epidemiology at Michigan State University's Medical School since October 2003, with service as department chairman until 2009. From 1972 to 2003, he was on the faculties of the University of Minnesota College of Pharmacy and the Johns Hopkins University School of Hygiene and Public Health (now known as 'the Bloomberg School of Public Health'). He continues to serve as an adjunct professor at Johns Hopkins and is associated with their Department of Mental Health.

His college-level education in liberal arts and sciences started in 1967 at Carleton College, Northfield, MN, where he earned his bachelor's degree in 1971. From 1973 to 1977 he studied pharmacy sciences, child & adolescent development and epidemiology in the Graduate School of the University of Minnesota, where he earned the Master of Science (1975) and Doctor of Philosophy degrees (1977). He then received a National Institute of Mental Health postdoctoral research fellowship award to study psychopathology, psychiatric epidemiology and biostatistics with Professors Ernest M. Gruenberg and Morton Kramer at Johns Hopkins. His faculty and professional appointments have been: instructor (UMinn, 1972–1977); postdoctoral research fellow (JHU, 1977–78); assistant professor (JHU, 1978–1984); associate professor (JHU, 1985–1989); Professor with Tenure (JHU, 1990–2003); professor with tenure (MSU, 2003–present). In 2006 he was appointed as 'Professor Honorario' at Universidad Peruana Cayetano Heredia (UPCH) in Lima, Peru in recognition of his leadershiop of the NIH-funded JHU-MSU-UPCH collaborations in epidemiology research training with a focus on hazards of alcohol, tobacco, and other drug use, and related psychiatric conditions such as the mood disturbances. A more complete curriculum vitae and summary of his discoveries, accomplishments, honors, and awards can be found in the External links section.
