= Anthony (disambiguation) =

Anthony is a common male given name.

Anthony may also refer to:

== Awards ==
- Anthony Awards, literary awards
- Tony Awards, theatre awards

== Locations ==
=== United Kingdom ===
- Antony, Cornwall (usage varies)

=== United States ===
- Anthony, Florida
- Anthony, Indiana
- Anthony, Kansas
- Anthony, New Jersey
- Anthony, New Mexico, neighboring Anthony, Texas
- Anthony, Texas, neighboring Anthony, New Mexico

== People ==
- Anthony (surname)

=== Saints and clerics ===
- St. Anthony the Great, of Egypt, 4th-century founder of Christian monasticism
- St. Anthony the Hermit (Antony of Lerins), 5th-century hermit of Italy and Gaul
- St. Anthony of Kiev, founder of Russian monasticism
- St. Anthony of Padua, considered the greatest miracle worker of the thirteenth century, also known as Anthony of Lisbon
- St. Antoninus of Florence, archbishop of Florence

=== Monarchs ===
- Anthony I of Portugal, (known commonly as António, Prior of Crato, 1531–1595), disputed King of Portugal and the Algarves
- Antoine of Navarre (also known as Anthony of Navarre, 1518–1562), King of Navarre and Duke of Bourbon
- Antoine, Duke of Lorraine (1489–1544)
- Anton of Saxony (also known as Anthony of Saxony, 1755–1836)), King of Saxony

=== Other ===
- Anthony (film editor) (born 1973), Indian film editor
- Anthony (footballer) (born 2005), Brazilian footballer
- Anthony (writer) (born 1984), Chinese author

=== Fictional characters ===
- Anthony (comics), Indian comic book character
- Anthony (Encantadia), fictional character in Encantadia
- Anthony (The Father), a dementia patient in the movie The Father

== See also ==
- Anthony (film), a 2026 Sri Lankan film
- Antoine
- Antony (disambiguation)
- Anton (disambiguation)
- Antonia (disambiguation)
- Antonio
- Antonius
- Saint Anthony (disambiguation)
- Tony (disambiguation)
- Anthony Peak
