= Daniel Anthony =

Daniel Anthony may refer to:

- Dan Anthony, American recording artist, songwriter and musician
- Daniel Anthony (actor) (born 1987), British actor
- Daniel Read Anthony, Jr. (1870–1931), American Republican politician
- Daniel Read Anthony (1824–1904), American publisher and abolitionist; father to Daniel Read Anthony, Jr
