= Wijnand Nuijen =

Dutch painter and printmaker (1813–1839)

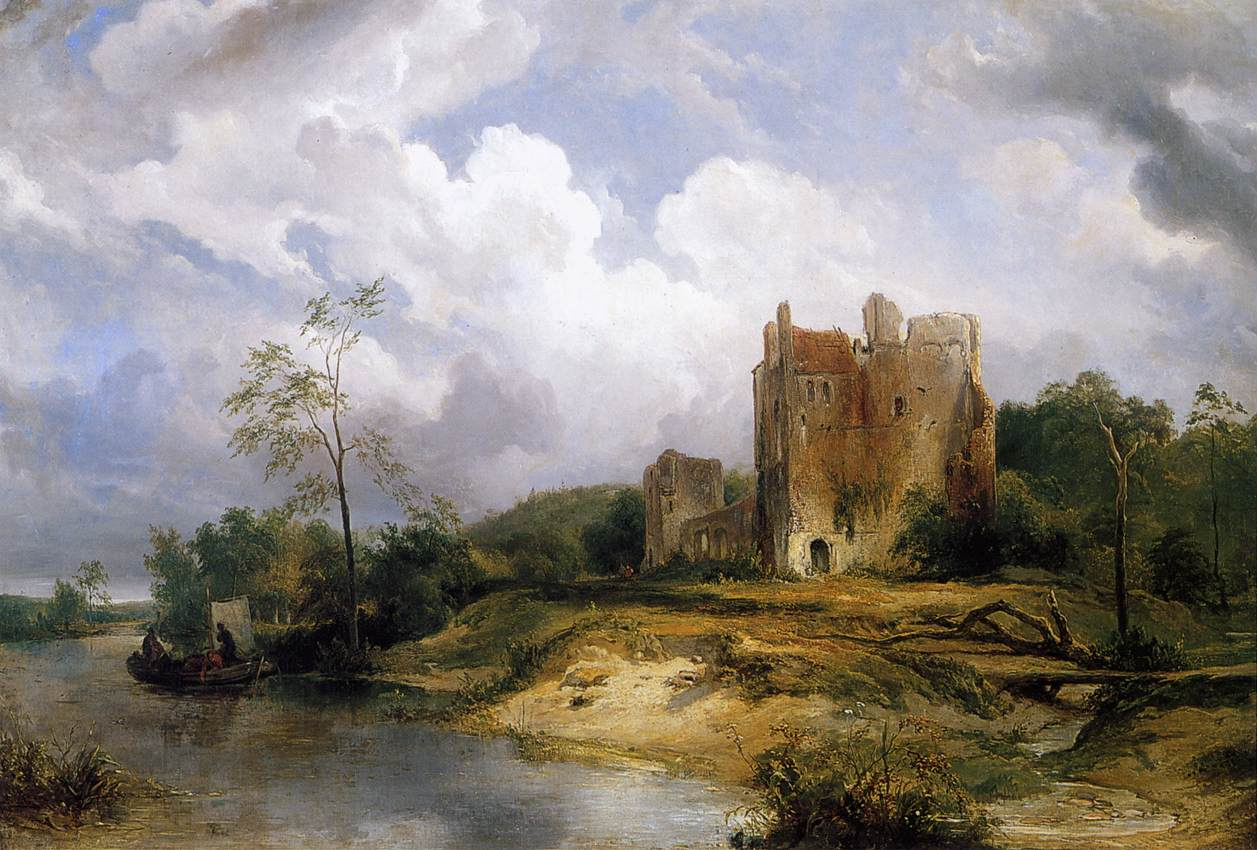
W. Nuijen, 1838: River Landscape with Ruins, oil on canvas, 99 x 141.5 cm, Rijksmuseum

Wijnand Jan Josephus Nuijen (4 March 1813 – 2 June 1839) was a Dutch painter and printmaker who specialised in landscapes, and was greatly influenced by the French Romantics.

== Biography ==
Born in The Hague (Den Haag) to a baker father who recognised his son's talent, Nuijen was apprenticed at age twelve to Andreas Schelfhout, a local artist. Between 1825 and 1829 he studied at the Den Haag Tekenacademie, under Bartholomeus Johannes van Hove. In his short lifespan Nuijen became a prolific painter of rural and marine landscapes, spending much time on the Normandy and northern French coasts. Here he fell under the spell of painters who were working in France, such as Richard Parkes Bonington (1802–1828) and Eugène Isabey (1803–1886), both of whom painted picturesque villages, Normandy harbours and seascapes, with a spontaneity Nuijen admired and adopted. His preoccupation with ruins is typically Romantic and his use of colour and texture is reminiscent of the watercolours of Turner.

The Felix Meritis society of Amsterdam awarded him a medal in 1829 for his watercolour of a forest landscape. On completion of his tuition he travelled to Belgium, France and Germany, at times with his painting companion Antonie Waldorp [1803–1866]. Nuijen became a member of the Koninklijke Akademie in Amsterdam in 1836, and just before his death he married the daughter of Schelfhout, his former tutor. Nuijen died in The Hague on 2 June 1839.

Nuijen was unusual among Dutch painters of the period, his theatricality and liberal style contrasting with the near photographic depiction that was then the norm. King William II greatly admired Nuijen's work, and when he bought the "Shipwreck" in 1843 he already owned five other Nuijen paintings.

== Paintings ==
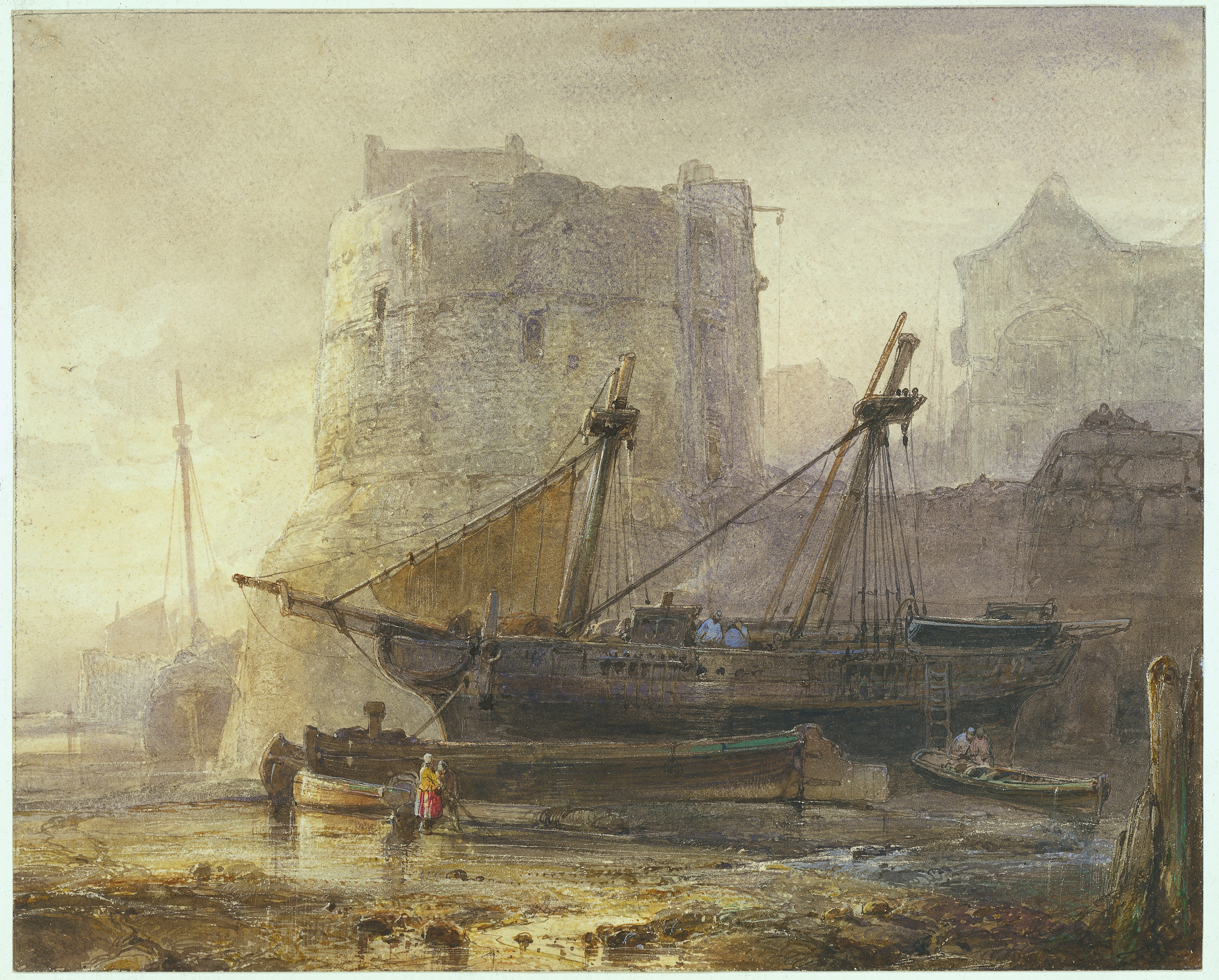
W. Nuijen, Ships in a French Harbor at Low Tide, 1836, black chalk and watercolor on paper, 31.2 x 38.6 cm Rijksmuseum

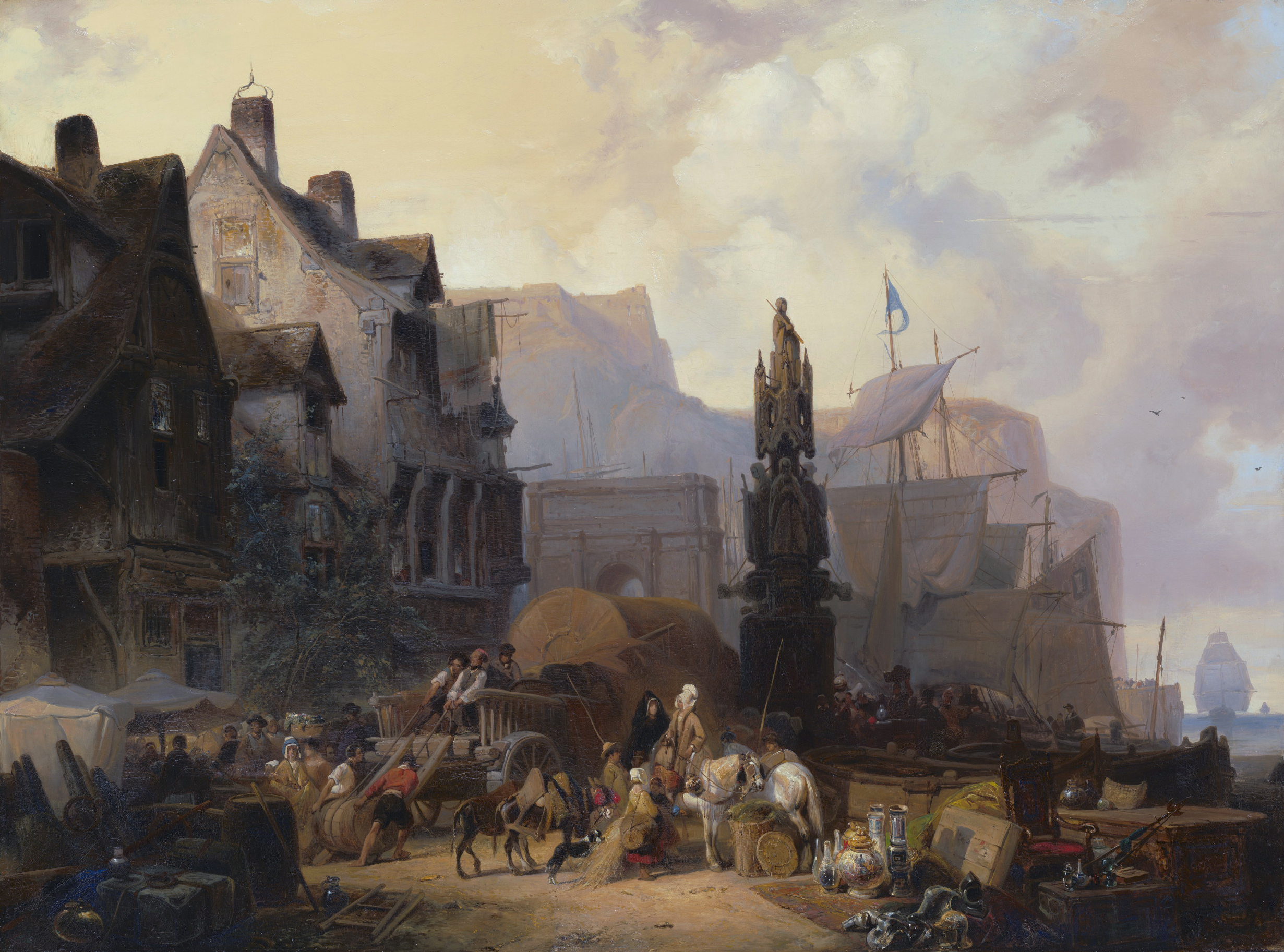
W, Nuijen, A busy port in Normandy, 1836, oil on canvas, 81 x 110 cm, Teylers Museum

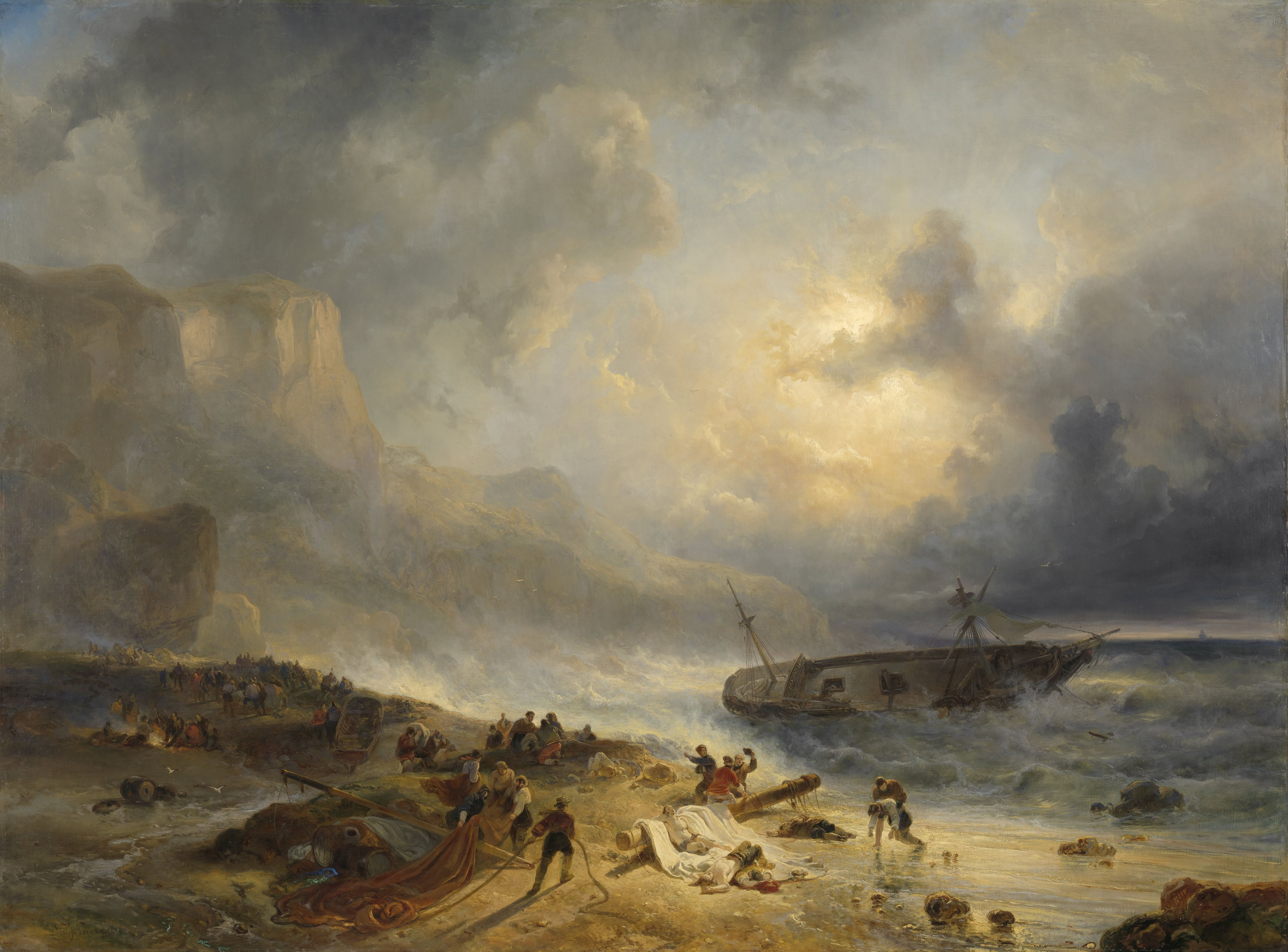
W, Nuijen,Shipwreck on a Rocky Coast, 1837, oil on canvas, 154 x 206 cm, Rijksmuseum

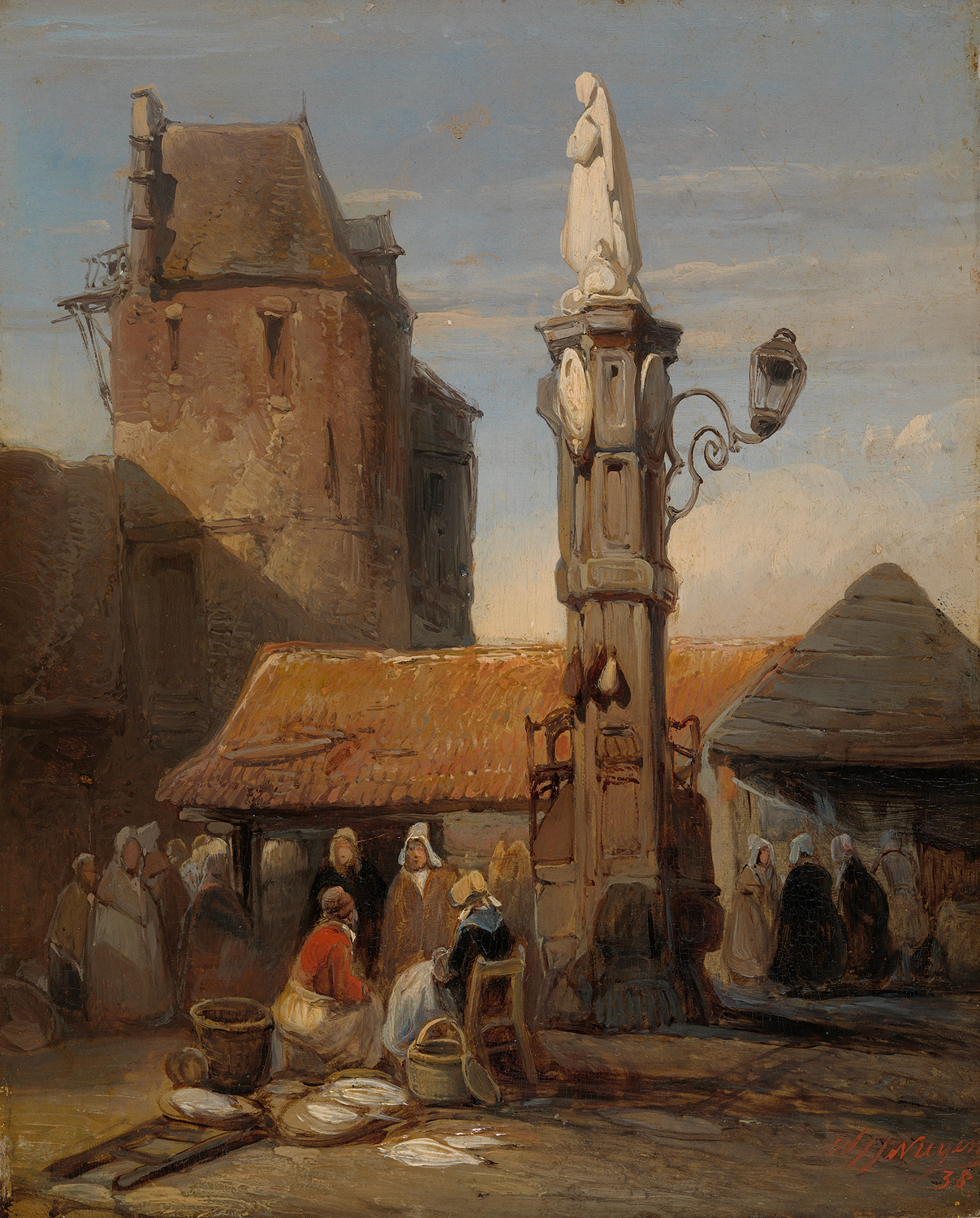
W. Nuijen, 1838: A Fish-market, oil on canvas, 19.2 x 15.5 cm, Amsterdam Museum

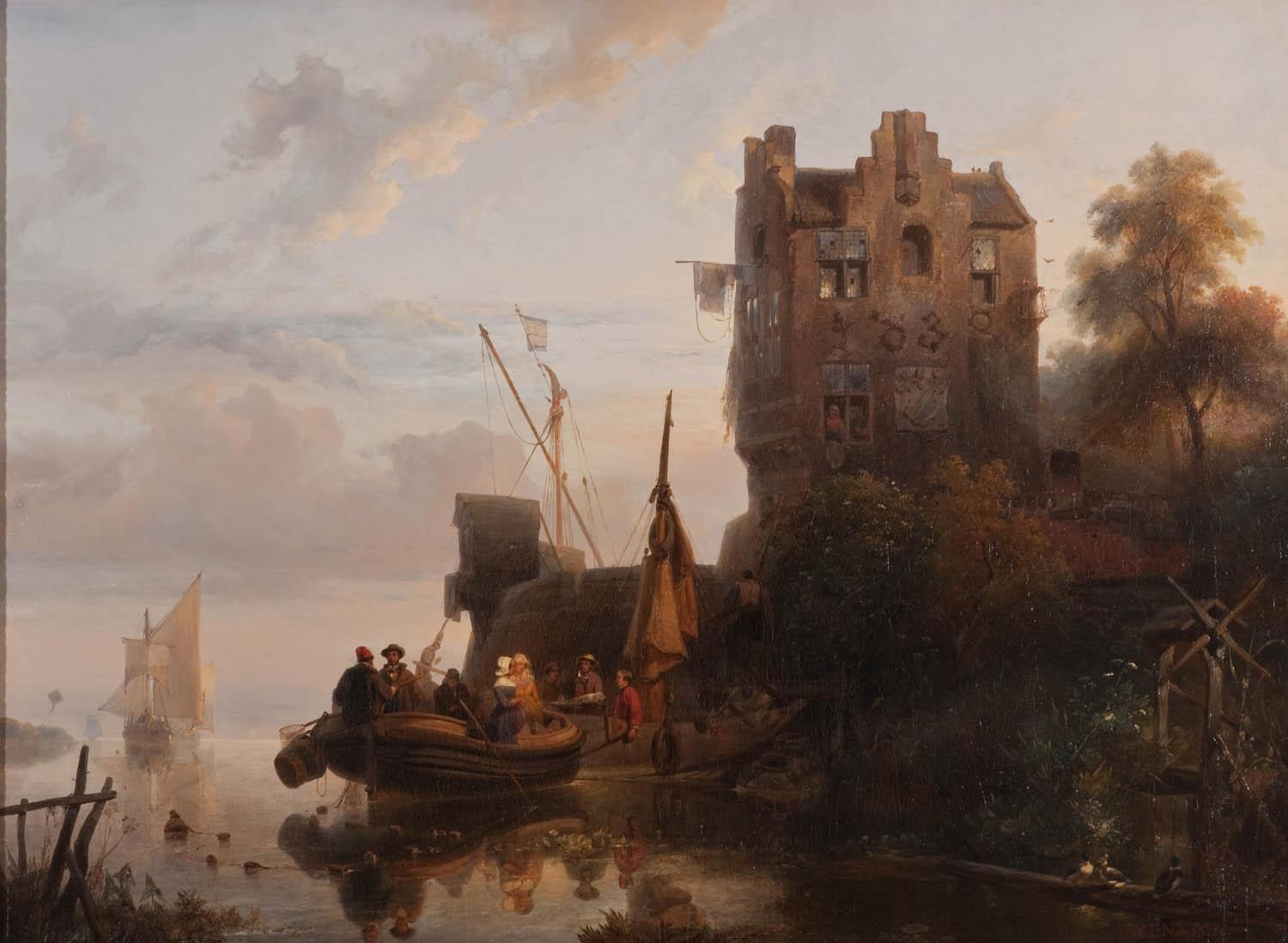
W, Nuijen, Out Boating, 1839, oil on canvas, 77 x 104 cm, private collection
