= Antonis Daglis =

Greek serial killer

- Born: 1974; Nikaia, Attica, Greece
- Died: 2 August 1997 (aged 22–23); Korydallos Prison, Korydallos, Greece
- Other name: The Athens Ripper
- Penalty: Life imprisonment plus 25 years

Details
- Victims: 3 murders 6 attempted murders
- Span of crimes: 1992–1995
- Country: Greece
- State: Attica

Antonis Daglis (Greek: Αντώνης Δαγκλής; 1974 – 2 August 1997) was a Greek serial killer who was convicted of the murders of three women and attempted murder of six others in Athens on 23 January 1997. Referred to as the Athens Ripper he was sentenced to thirteen terms of life imprisonment, plus 25 years.

== Crimes ==
Daglis, a truck driver, preyed upon Athens prostitutes between 1992 and 1995. He had been a repeat juvenile offender since the age of 14. He had a prior record for a 1988 charge of seducing a minor, and in 1989 he was arrested for attacking a group of men at the Zappeion in Athens with a knife.

Daglis was initially suspected of two murders after he was arrested for the rape and abduction of an English woman named Ann Hamson. After his arrest, Daglis confessed to the rape, strangulation and dismemberment of two women and the attempted murder of a further six, and having robbed all eight women. He later admitted to dismembering the bodies of two women, Eleni Panagiotopoulou, 29, and Athina Lazarou, 26, with a hacksaw and disposing of them around Athens. Daglis subsequently confessed to the previously unsolved murder of a prostitute whose dismembered body was found in a dumpster in 1992.

During his trial, Daglis told the court, "I hated all prostitutes and continue to hate them. I went to meet them for sex but suddenly other pictures came into my head. I heard voices which ordered me to kill. Once I thought about strangling my fiancée, but I restrained myself." He revealed that he hated prostitutes because his mother had been one.

On 2 August 1997, Daglis was found hanging dead in his cell, along with his cellmate G. Makridis, in an apparent suicide pact.

== See also ==
- List of serial killers by country
