= Antony =

Antony may refer to:

- Antony (name), a masculine name

== Films ==
- Antony (2018 film), an Indian Tamil-language action drama film
- Antony (2023 film), an Indian Malayalam-language action drama film

== People ==
- Antony (footballer, born 2000) (Antony Matheus dos Santos), Brazilian footballer who plays for Real Betis
- Antony (the former name of Anohni), the leader of the rock band Antony and the Johnsons
- Antony (footballer, born 2001) (Antony Alves Santos), Brazilian footballer who plays for Portland Timbers
- Mark Antony, Roman politician and general

== Places and structures ==
- Antony, Cornwall, a village in Cornwall, United Kingdom
  - Antony House, Cornwall, England
- Arrondissement of Antony, in the Hauts-de-Seine département of France
  - Antony, Hauts-de-Seine, a commune in Antony, Hauts-de-Seine département of France
- Antony station, a train station on the RER B line in Paris
