= Antoinette =

- Gender: Female
- Language: French

Origin
- Meaning: praise or highly praiseworthy

Other names
- See also: Antoine, Antonietta, Antony, Tony, Antonius, Antonella, Antonia

Antoinette is a given name, that is a diminutive feminine form of Antoine and Antonia (from Latin Antonius).

People with the name include:

== Nobles ==
- Antoinette de Maignelais, Baroness of Villequier by marriage (1434–1474), mistress of Charles VII of France and later of Francis II, Duke of Brittany
- Antoinette d'Aubeterre (1532–1580), French noblewoman
- Antoinette of Bourbon (1494–1583), French noblewoman of the House of Bourbon
- Antoinette d'Orléans-Longueville (1572–1618), French noblewoman
- Princess Antoinette of Brunswick-Wolfenbüttel (1696–1762), Duchess of Brunswick-Wolfenbüttel
- Princess Antoinette of Saxe-Coburg-Saalfeld (1779–1824), German princess
- Antoinette de Mérode (1828–1864), Princess of Monaco
- Princess Antoinette of Saxe-Altenburg (1838–1908), Duchess consort of Anhalt
- Princess Antoinette, Baroness of Massy (1920–2011), Monégasque princess

== Artists and entertainers ==
- Antoinette Asselineau (1811–1889), French painter
- Antoinette Azolakov (born 1944), American author
- Antoinette de Beaucaire (1840–1865), Occitan language poet
- Antoinette Becker (1920–1998), French-German author
- Antoinette Béfort (1788–1868), French history painter
- Antoinette Beumer (born 1962), Dutch film director
- Antoinette Bower (born 1932), German-born British actress
- Aontinette Byron (born 1961 or 1962), Australian actress
- Antoinette Cellier (1913–1981), English actress
- Antoinette Henriette Clémence Robert (1797–1872), French writer
- Antoinette Clinton (born 1985), American beatboxer, singer, and musician known as Butterscotch
- Antoinette Concello (1910–1984), American trapeze artist
- Antoinette Crowe-Legacy, American actress
- Antoinette de Saliès (1639–1730), French writer and feminist
- Antoinette Donnelly (1887–1964), American newspaper advice columnist and author
- Antoinette du Ligier de la Garde Deshoulières (1638–1694), French poet
- Antoinette Garnes (about 1887–1938), American soprano
- Antoinette Halloran, Australian operatic soprano
- D. Antoinette Handy (1930–2002), American musician and scholar
- Antoinette Hertsenberg (born 1964), Dutch television presenter
- Antoinette Jadaone (born 1984), Filipino film and television director
- Antoinette Delali Kemavor, Ghanaian Beauty Queen/ model
- Antoinette Kirkwood (1930–2014), English composer
- Antoinette Konan (born 1960), Ivorian singer
- Antoinette Lattouf (born 1983), Australian-Lebanese journalist
- Antoinette Louw (born 1975), South African actress
- Antoinette Lovell Patterson (born 1970), American rapper Antoinette (rapper)
- Antoinette Lubaki (1895-?), watercolourist, Congo's first known named female artist
- Antoinette Martignoni (1918–2018), American artist
- Antoinette McKenna (1952–2012), Irish singer and harpist
- Antoinette Miggiani (born 1937), Maltese soprano
- Antoinette Montague, American jazz and blues singer
- Antoinette Najeeb (1930–2022), Syrian actress
- Antoinette Hendrika Nijhoff-Wind (1897–1971), Dutch writer
- Antoinette Nwandu, American playwright
- Antoinette Ockerse (1762 – 1828), Dutch poet
- Antoinette Perry (1888–1946), American actress and director for whom the Tony Awards are named after
- Antoinette Pienaar (born 1961), South African actress, singer, and author
- Antoinette Quarré (1813-1847), French poet
- Antoinette Roberson, American songwriter
- Antoinette Robertson, American actress
- Antoinette Sasse (1897–1986), French painter
- Antoinette Sibley (born 1939), British ballerina
- Antoinette Sterling (1850–1904), Anglo-American vocalist
- Antoinette Szumowska (1868–1938), Polish pianist
- Antoinette Taus (born 1980), Filipino-American actress
- Antoinette-Thérèse Des Houlières (1659–1718), French poet
- Antoinette Van Hoesen Wakeman (1847–1921), American journalist
- Antoinette van Hoytema (1875-1967), Dutch artist

== Athletes ==
- Antoinette Borg (born 1988), Maltese basketball player
- Antoinette Gasongo (born 1994 or 1996), Burundian judoka
- Antoinette Gauthier (born 1955), Haitian sprinter
- Antoinette Guedia Mouafo (born 1995), Cameroonian swimmer
- Antoinette de Jong (born 1995), Dutch speed skater
- Antoinette Kuiters (born 1939), South African gymnast
- Antoinette Lucas (born 1968), American field hockey player
- Antoinette Meyer (1920–2010), Swiss alpine skier
- Antoinette Nana Djimou (born 1985), Cameroonian-French heptathlete and pentathlete
- Antoinette Rijpma-de Jong (born 1995), Dutch speed skater
- Antoinette Uys (born 1976), South African badminton player

== Politicians ==
- Antoinette Batumubwira (born 1956), Burundian politician
- Antoinette Perry (born 1953 or 1954), 29th lieutenant governor of Prince Edward Island
- Antoinette Dinga Dzondo (born 1955), Congolese politician
- Antoinette Guhl (born 1970), French politician
- Antoinette Kinney (1862–1945), American politician and community leader
- Antoinette Laan-Geselschap (born 1965), Dutch politician
- Antoinette Montaigne, French/Central African politician and lawyer
- Antoinette Sandbach (born 1969), Welsh politician
- Antoinette D. Sanford, Guamanian businesswoman and politician
- Antoinette Spaak (1928–2020), Belgian politician
- Antoinette Vassallo, Maltese public official and former politician
- Antoinette Waroh (1901–1991), Indonesian politician

== Intellectuals ==
- Antoinette Burton (born 1961), American historian
- Antoinette Candia-Bailey (1974–2024), American academic administrator
- Antoinette Downing (1904–2001), American architect
- Antoinette Fouque (1936–2014), French psychoanalyst
- Antoinette Galvin, Space physicist
- Antoinette Konikow (1869–1946), American physician, feminist, and radical political activist
- Antoinette Maniatty (born 1965), American mechanical engineer
- Antoinette Pirie (1905–1991), British biochemist, ophthalmologist, and educator
- Antoinette Sayeh (born 1958), Liberian economist
- Antoinette Schoar, American economist
- Antoinette Taylor, American physicist
- Antoinette Tordesillas, Australian mathematician
- Antoinette de Vaucouleurs (1921–1987), French-American astronomer

== Others ==
- Antoinette Brunyer (1734–1801), French courtier
- Antoinette Bonner (1892–1920), Romanian American jewel thief
- Antoinette Bourignon (1616–1680), French-Flemish mystic and adventurer
- Antoinette Bouzonnet-Stella (c. 1641–1676), French engraver
- Antoinette Brown Blackwell (1825–1921), first woman to be ordained as a mainstream Protestant minister in the United States
- Antoinette Butte (1898–1986), French Protestant
- Antoinette Cazal (1862–1902), French brasserie server, anarchist and illegalist
- Antoinette Chahine (born 1971 or 1972), Lebanese activist
- Antoinette Gabrielle Charpentier (c. 1762–1793), French wife of the Georges Jacques Danton
- Antoinette Gérard (1909–1958), French poet and resistance fighter
- Antoinette Dakin Leach (1859–1922), American lawyer
- Antoinette Duclaire (1987–2021), Haitian feminist and political activist
- Antoinette Fage (1824–1883), French catholic nun
- Antoinette Feuerwerker (1912–2003), French Resistance member and jurist
- Antoinette Flegenheim (1863–1943), Prussian-American Survivor of the sinking of the Titanic
- Antoinette Frank (born 1971), American convicted murderer
- Antoinette Funk (1873–1942), American lawyer and women's rights activist
- Antoinette Arnold Hawley (1842–1919), American temperance activist and leader
- Antoinette Nording (1814–1887), Swedish perfume entrepreneur
- Antoinette Ouédraogo, Burkinabé lawyer and women's rights and environmental activist
- Antoinette Robain (born 1956), French architect
- Antoinette Pinchot Bradlee (1924–2011), American socialite
- Antoinette Scieri (1890–1968), French nurse and convicted murderer
- Antoinette Scott (born 1970), American nurse and soldier
- Antoinette Sedillo Lopez (born 1957), American attorney, politician, and retired law professor
- Antoinette Tsono (died 2015), Gabonese nurse and politician
- Antoinette Tubman (1914–2011), First Lady of Liberia
- Antoinette Van Leer Polk (1847–1919), American plantation owner

== Last Name ==
- Bernard Antoinette (1914–2008), French footballer and manager
- Jean-Étienne Antoinette (born 1966), French Guianan politician
- Uwamahoro Antoinette (born 1975), Rwandan actress

== See also ==
- Other feminine given names formed from "Antonius":
  - Antionette
  - Antonella
  - Antonette
  - Antonia (disambiguation)
  - Antonietta (disambiguation)
- Marie Antoinette (disambiguation)
