= Antoinette (disambiguation) =

Antoinette is a female given name.

Antoinette may also refer to:

- Antoinette (barque), a Canadian ship wrecked in 1895
- Antoinette (film), a 1932 French film
- Antoinette (manufacturer), a French engine manufacturer
  - various aircraft manufactured by the above
- Bernard Antoinette (1914–2008), French footballer
- Jean-Étienne Antoinette (born 1966), French Guianan politician
- Tropical Storm Antoinette, a 1996 Indian Ocean tropical cyclone

== See also ==
- Antionette (disambiguation)
- Antoinette Perry Award for Excellence in Broadway Theatre, better known as the Tony Awards
- Antonella (disambiguation)
- Antonette (disambiguation)
- Antonia (disambiguation)
- Antonietta (disambiguation)
- Marie Antoinette (disambiguation)
