= Marie Antoinette (given name) =

Marie Antoinette or Marie-Antoinette is a feminine French compound given name from the root names Miriam and Antonius. Notable people referred to by this name include the following:

- Marie Antoinette, whose birthname was Maria Antonia Josepha Johanna, (1755–1793), last Queen of France before the French Revolution
- Duchess Marie Antoinette of Mecklenburg-Schwerin, (1884–1944), second daughter of Duke Paul Frederick of Mecklenburg and Princess Marie of Windisch-Graetz
- Marie-Antoinette de Geuser (1889–1918), French Carmelites
- Marie-Antoinette Demagnez (1869–1925), French sculptor
- Marie-Antoinette Duchesne (after 1713–1793), French publisher and bookseller
- Marie-Antoinette Guy-Stéphan, known as Marie Guy-Stéphan (1818–1873), French dancer
- Marie-Antoinette Katoto (born 1998), French professional footballer
- Marie Antoinette Sarangaya Leviste, known as Toni Leviste (born 1973), Filipina equestrian
- Marie-Antoinette Lix (1839–1909), French governess
- Marie Antoinette Marcotte (1867–1929), French painter
- Marie Antoinette Murat (1793–1847), member of the Houses of Murat and Hohenzollern-Sigmaringen, and Princess consort of Hohenzollern-Sigmaringe
- Marie Antoinette Petersén (Maria Antonia Petersén) (1771–1855), Swedish violinist and singer
- Marie-Antoinette Rose, Seychellois politician
- Marie-Antoinette Tonnelat (1912–1980), French theoretical physicist
- Marie Antoinette Wright, birth name of Free Marie (born 1968) American rapper and television personality
- Princess Marie Antoinette of Schwarzburg (1898–1984), eldest child of Sizzo, Prince of Schwarzburg

== See also ==
- Marie Antoinette (disambiguation)
- Maria Antonia (disambiguation)
- María Antonieta
- María Antonietta
- Maria Antonina
