= ANJ =

ANJ may refer to:

== Aviation ==
- Sault Ste. Marie Municipal Airport, FAA LID code
- Zanaga Airport, Republic of the Congo, IATA code

== Media and entertainment ==
- AN-J (A Natural Jade), a disbanded Japanese female singing group with three members

== Organizations ==
- ANJ Group, an American company
- ANJ, Autorité Nationale des Jeux, France's National Gaming Authority
