= Quarré =

Quarré may refer to:

== People ==
- Antoinette Quarré (1813-1847), French poet
- Jean Quarré (1919–1942), French printer and communist activist

== Other ==
- Quarré-les-Tombes, a commune in the Bourgogne-Franche-Comté region of north-central France
