= Ninetta =

Ninetta is a diminutive form of Antonia, Antonietta and Antonetta in use in Italy and other countries. Notable people with this name include the following:

- Ninetta May Runnals (1885–1980), American academic
- Nineta Barbulescu (born 1968), Romanian career diplomat
- Ninetta Bartoli (1896–1978), first woman mayor in Italy
- Ninetta Vad (born 1989), Hungarian canoer
- Netta Eames, born Ninetta Wiley (1852–1944), American writer

== See also ==
- Nietta Zocchi
- Nineta Barbulescu
- Ninette (disambiguation)
- Ninetto Davoli
