= Antonette =

Antonette is a given name. Notable people with this name include the following

== Given name ==
- Antonette Ruth Sabel (1894 – 1974), American music educator, composer, and arts administrator
- Antonette Wemyss Gorman (born 1972 or 1973), Jamaican military officer
- Antonette Wilken (born 1961), Zimbabwean diver
- Antonette M. Zeiss, American clinical psychologist

== Middle name ==
- Kalilah Antonette Enríquez, given name of Kalilah Enríquez (born 1983), Belizean journalist and poet.
- Henriette Marie Antonette Luplau, given name of Marie Luplau (1848 – 1925), Danish artist
- Helena Antonette Gerrietsen, given name of Lenie Gerrietsen (born 1930), Dutch gymnast

== See also ==
- Antonetta
- Antionette
- Antoinette
- Tonette (given name)
