= Toinette =

Toinette is a French given name in use in French speaking countries as a short form of Antoinette. Notable people with this name include the following:

== Middle name ==
- Kay Toinette Oslin, known as K. T. Oslin, (1942–2020), American singer
- Marie-Lizza Toinette Danila, known as Lizza Danila (born 1982), Filipino swimmer

== Fictional characters ==
- Toinette, 1991 Cesar-Award-winning film Tous les Matins du Monde based on 1991 novel All the World's Mornings
- Toinette, 1930 Oscar nominated film The Big Pond

== See also ==
- Tonette (given name)
- Tionette Stoddard
