= Antionette =

Antionette is an alternate form of the French and Latin feminine given name Antoinette. It was among the top 2000 female baby names in the US from the late 19th century through the late 20th century. Notable people with this name include the following:

- Antionette Carroll, American activist and entrepreneur
- Antionette Oyedupe Payne, full name of Toni Payne (born 1995), American-born Nigerian footballer
- Simone Antionette Johnson, known as Monie Love (born 1970), British rapper, actress and radio personality

== See also ==
- Antoinette
- Antonette
- Tionette Stoddard
