= Georges Moyen =

Congolese doctor and academic

Georges Moyen is a Congolese doctor and academic who served in the government of Congo-Brazzaville as Minister of Health from 2009 to 2012 and Minister of Higher Education from 2012 to 2016.

== Life and career ==
Moyen studied medicine at Cheikh Anta Diop University in Dakar, Senegal. He is a pediatrician by profession, and he was the Rector of the Marien Ngouabi University in Brazzaville from 2003 to 2009. He was appointed to the government as Minister of Health and Population on 15 September 2009. Moyen took office on 24 September, succeeding Émilienne Raoul.

On World AIDS Day, 1 December 2009, Moyen said that the percentage of the population infected with HIV had fallen by 0.9% to 3.2% over the preceding six years. He also said that it was important to recognize that "our common enemy is HIV/AIDS, not people living with the virus", and that it was necessary to work with infected people instead of stigmatizing them.

Following a deadly 2010 outbreak of polio—a disease that had not been recorded in Congo-Brazzaville for the previous 10 years—Moyen oversaw a mass vaccination campaign, performed in stages in September 2010 and December 2010. Additionally, Moyen launched a nationwide measles vaccination campaign on 20 December 2010 for children between the ages of nine months and five years. As the polio vaccination campaign continued, Moyen said on 25 January 2011 that there would be a coordinated vaccination campaign with two neighboring countries, Congo-Kinshasa and Gabon, in February 2011. He also said that 220 people had died, and 542 cases of the disease had been recorded, since the outbreak began in October 2010.

Moyen launched a campaign to raise awareness about sickle cell disease in the Pool Department on 8 May 2012.

Moyen was moved to the post of Minister of Higher Education on 25 September 2012. During Moyen's stint as Minister of Higher Education, plans moved forward for the establishment of a new university, Denis Sassou Nguesso University; it would be Congo-Brazzaville's second public university, after Marien Ngouabi University. Speaking in November 2013, Moyen said that a single public university was insufficient, and he discussed the government's plans for "devolution of higher education, the gradual establishment of institutions of higher education across the country".

Speaking on 30 June 2014, Moyen stressed that the preservation of peace was the key principle guiding Sassou Nguesso's policies, leading to his "constant involvement in the search for dialogue in international relations and in the pursuit of national unity".

After Sassou Nguesso's victory in the March 2016 presidential election, he appointed Bruno Itoua to replace Moyen as Minister of Higher Education on 30 April 2016.
