= List of universities in the Republic of the Congo =

This is a list of universities and colleges in the Republic of the Congo.

== Public Universities ==
- Higher Institute of Technology of Central Africa, Brazzaville
- Marien Ngouabi University, Brazzaville
- Denis Sassou Nguesso University, Dolisie
