= Sault Ste. Marie Municipal Airport =

Airport in Michigan, United States

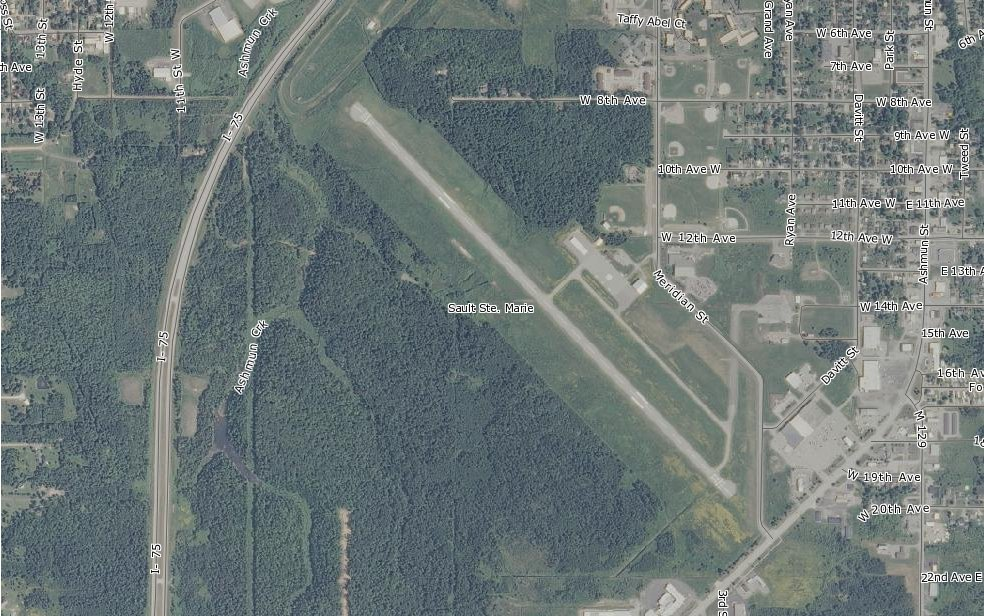
- IATA: SSM; ICAO: KANJ; FAA LID: ANJ

Summary
- Airport type: Public
- Owner: City of Sault Saint Marie
- Operator: Soo Air - FBO
- Serves: Sault Ste. Marie, Michigan
- Location: 2144 Meridian St., Sault Ste. Marie, MI 49783
- Time zone: UTC−05:00 (-5)
  - Summer (DST): UTC−04:00 (-4)
- Elevation AMSL: 716 ft / 218 m
- Coordinates: 46°28′45″N 84°22′06″W

Map
- Location of airport in Michigan SSM/KANJ/ANJ (the United States)

Runways
Direction	Length		Surface
Direction	ft	m	Surface
14/32	5,234	1,595	Asphalt

Statistics (2021)
- Aircraft operations: 9,067
- Based aircraft: 15
- Source: Federal Aviation Administration

Sault Ste. Marie Municipal Airport (IATA: SSM, ICAO: KANJ, FAA LID: ANJ), also known as Sanderson Field, is a city-owned, public-use airport located 1 nmi (1.9 km) southwest of the central business district of Sault Ste. Marie, a city in Chippewa County, Michigan, United States.

Although most U.S. airports use the same three-letter location identifier for the FAA and IATA, Sault Ste. Marie Municipal Airport is assigned ANJ by the FAA but has no designation from the IATA (which assigned ANJ to Zanaga Airport in Zanaga, Republic of the Congo).

== Facilities and aircraft ==
Sault Ste. Marie Municipal Airport covers an area of 400 acres (160 ha) at an elevation of 716 feet (218 m) above mean sea level. It has one runway designated 14/32 with an asphalt surface measuring 5,234 by 100 feet (1,595 x 30 m).

For the twelve-month period ending December 31, 2021, the airport had 9,067 general aviation aircraft operations, an average of 25 per day. For the same time period, there were 15 aircraft based at this airport, all single-engine airplanes.

The airport has a fixed-base operator (FBO). In addition to fuel – both avgas and Jet A – the FBO offers services such as general maintenance, catering, hangars, courtesy cars, coffee, a conference room, a crew lounge, and snooze rooms.

== Accidents and incidents ==
- A Mooney M20E was involved in an accident at the airport on October 16, 1982.
- On February 26, 2001, a Cessna 500 Citation I sustained substantial damage when the aircraft departed the end of runway 32 at the Sault Ste. Marie Municipal Airport. The aircraft flew the VOR approach to runway 32, and the captain said they transitioned to a visual approach at 2500 feet. After touchdown, the aircraft fishtailed, and the captain called for a go-around around midfield. The first officer disagreed but decided to comply with the command. The aircraft went off the end of the runway. The probable cause of the accident was found to be the pilot's exceeding the available runway distance during landing and the pilot's delay in executing a go-around. Factors relating to the accident were the pilot's improper in-flight planning/decision, the pilot's disregarding the NOTAMS for the airport, the pilot's failing to properly consider the warning given by the Unicom operator regarding the icy runway and nil braking action, the icy runway, and the drop-off/descending embankment at the end of the runway.
- On January 5, 2006, a Beech A100 King Air operating as a medical service flight veered off the runway during landing at Sault Ste. Marie Municipal Airport. The aircraft received substantial damage when it impacted the snow-covered terrain. The pilot stated that he executed the VOR 32 approach and broke out of a cloud layer about 900 feet above ground level (AGL). Approximately 2 miles from the airport, he could see the runway lights and that the runway was "completely" snow and slush covered such that the runway lights became difficult to see. The airplane crossed the runway threshold at 100 knots indicated airspeed and landed approximately 700 feet down the runway. The pilot stated he immediately felt the airplane decelerate in deep slush and veer to the left but there "was nothing he could do" before the airplane's left main landing gear wheel "caught" a snow bank. The pilot reported that he knew ANJ was "getting" rain and was "expecting" the runway to be clear and was "surprised" that the runway was covered with "heavy" slush. The probable cause of the accident was found to be the inadequate in-flight decision to continue the approach to land, the pilot's failure to maintain directional control on the runway, and the contaminated runway.
- On May 5, 2018, an experimental, amateur-built Belair Raven impacted terrain during the initial climb after takeoff from Sault Ste. Marie Municipal Airport. According to witnesses, the airplane taxied to runway 32 and departed in a nose-high attitude. A flight instructor compared the climb to an aggressive short-field takeoff or a banner pilot's climb after picking up a banner. Witnesses noticed that, after reaching about 100 ft above ground level, the airplane turned right and transitioned to a steep nose-down spin until ground impact. The flight instructor stated that the engine noise sounded normal throughout the takeoff until ground impact. The probable cause of the accident was found to be the pilot's failure to maintain adequate airspeed during takeoff in gusty crosswind conditions, which resulted in the airplane exceeding its critical angle of attack and an aerodynamic stall.

== See also ==
- List of airports in Michigan
