= Émilienne Raoul =

Republic of the Congo politician (born 1945)

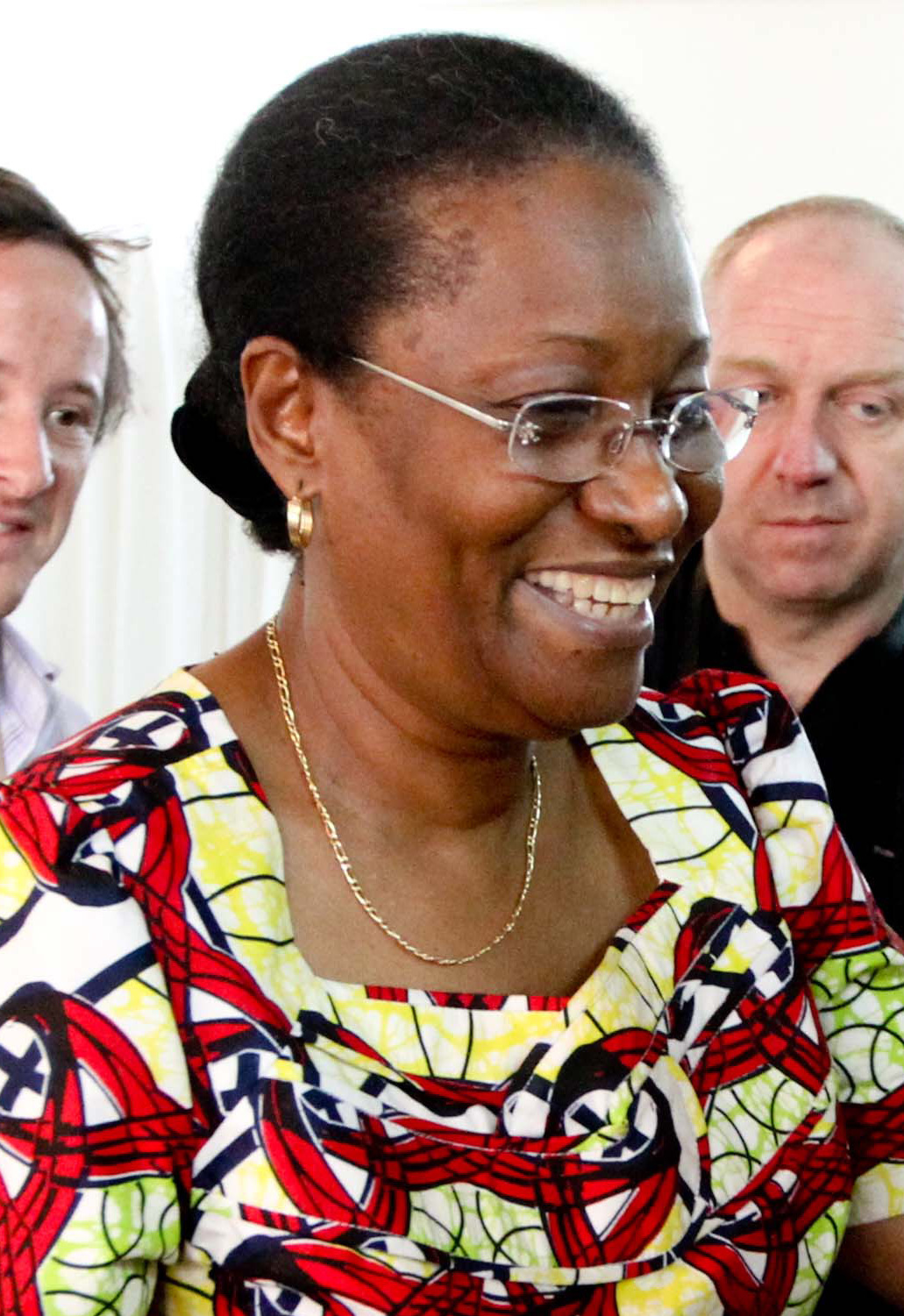
Émilienne Raoul in 2012.

Emilienne Raoul (née Matingou, born 7 January 1945) is a Congolese politician who served in the government of Congo-Brazzaville as Minister of Social Affairs from 2002 to 2016. She additionally served as Minister of Health from 2007 to 2009.

== Life and career ==
Raoul was born in Brazzaville and has a background working in education at the Marien Ngouabi University in Brazzaville. She was married to Alfred Raoul, who served as Prime Minister during the 1960s, prior to the latter's death in 1999. From 1998 to 2002, she was a member of the National Transitional Council (CNT), the interim parliament that existed during the transitional period which followed the 1997 civil war. Her writings include Alternative Strategies to Fight Against Poverty in Congo (Strategies alternatives de lutte contre la pauvrete au Congo), published in 2000.

In the May–June 2002 parliamentary election, held at the end of the transitional period, Raoul was elected to the National Assembly as an independent candidate in the first constituency of Brazzaville's Seventh Arrondissement (Mfilou); she won the seat in the second round of voting. Following the election, she was appointed to the government as Minister of Social Affairs, Solidarity, Humanitarian Action, Victims of War, and the Family on 18 August 2002.

On 3 March 2007, her ministerial portfolio was altered, and she was appointed as Minister of Health, Social Affairs and the Family. She accordingly succeeded Alphonse Gando at the Ministry of Health on 10 March. In addition to her post in the government, she was President of the Center for the Advancement of Women in Politics as of 2007.

Raoul's portfolio was reduced on 15 September 2009, when she was appointed as Minister of Social Affairs, Humanitarian Action, and Solidarity. She was succeeded by Georges Moyen at the Ministry of Health on 24 September.

After President Denis Sassou Nguesso's victory in the March 2016 presidential election, Raoul was dismissed from the government on 30 April 2016; Antoinette Dinga Dzondo was appointed to replace her as Minister of Social Affairs. Dinga Dzondo succeeded Raoul at the ministry on 7 May.
