= T-Dog =

T-Dog may refer to:

- Tionette Stoddard, a.k.a. T-Dog, New Zealand skeleton racer
- "T Dog", an alias of Anthony Weiner
- T-Dog (The Walking Dead), fictional character in The Walking Dead
- T-Dog, fictional character played by Max Kasch in the film Waiting...
