= Bambama =

Town in Lekoumou, Republic of the Congo

Coordinates: 2.5406°S 13.5461°E

Bambama is a town in the Lékoumou Department of the Republic of the Congo. It is the capital of Bambama District.
