= Antonique =

Antonique is a given name that is an variant of Antoinette and Antonia. Notable people known by that name include the following:

== Given name ==
- Antonique Smith (born 1983), American actress and singer

== Middle name ==
- Jonielle Antonique Smith, full name of Jonielle Smith (born 30 January 1996) is a Jamaican sprinter

== See also ==
- Anthonique Strachan
