= Antonutti (surname) =

Antonutti is a surname. It derived from the Antonius root name. Notable people with this surname include the following:

- Michele Antonutti (born 1986), Italian basketball player
- Omero Antonutti (1935–2019), Italian actor

== See also ==
- Antonetti
- Ildebrando Antoniutti
