= Zanaga mine =

Iron ore mine in Zanaga, Lékoumou Department, Republic of the Congo

- Location: Zanaga, Lékoumou Department, Republic of the Congo
- Products: Iron ore
- Opened: 1939

The Zanaga mine is a large iron mine located in the western part of the Republic of the Congo in Zanaga, Lékoumou Department. Zanaga represents one of the largest iron ore reserves in the Republic of the Congo and in the world having estimated reserves of 6.8 billion tonnes of ore grading 32% iron metal.
