= Uwamahoro =

Uwamahoro is both a given name and a surname. Notable people with the name include:

- Uwamahoro Antoinette (born 1975), Rwandan actress
- Cathia Uwamahoro (born 1993), Rwandan cricketer
- Elsie Uwamahoro (born 1988), Burundian swimmer
- Malaika Uwamahoro (born 1990), Rwandan-born actress
