= Antoinette Dinga Dzondo =

Congolese politician (born 1955)

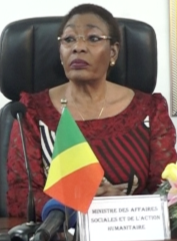
- Dinga Dzondo in 2017

Minister of Social Affairs and Humanitarian Action
- In office May 2016 – May 2021
- President: Denis Sassou Nguesso
- Prime Minister: Clément Mouamba
- Preceded by: Émilienne Raoul
- Succeeded by: Irène Mboukou

Personal details
- Born: 16 April 1955 Sibiti, Lékoumou Department, Republic of the Congo
- Education: Lille University of Science and Technology

Antoinette Dinga Dzondo (also Dinga-Dzondo; born 16 April 1955) is a Congolese politician who was the Republic of the Congo's Minister of Social Affairs and Humanitarian Action from 2016 to 2021.

== Personal life ==
Antoinette Dinga Dzondo was born in Sibiti, Lékoumou Department, Republic of the Congo. She studied at the Lille University of Science and Technology in France, where she earned a Bachelor of Economics degree in 1979, a master's degree in 1980, a Diploma of Advanced Studies in 1981, and a PhD in economic sciences in 1984.

== Career ==
From 1984 to 1985, Dinga Dzondo worked as a trainee at Congo's Ministry of Finance. Between 1985 and 1992, she worked for the Economic Community of Central African States, and from 1992 to 2016, she worked for the African Development Bank. Whilst at the African Development Bank, she worked for the International Monetary Fund as part of an exchange program, and also worked for five years in Burkina Faso.

In 2016, Dinga Dzondo was appointed Congo's Minister of Social Affairs and Humanitarian Action in Clément Mouamba's cabinet. She replaced Émilienne Raoul, who had held the role for 14 years. She retained the position in Mouamba's second cabinet government in 2017. In that position, she led the response to a humanitarian crisis in Kindamba and Pool Department, with $ 47 million of investment, including donations from the United States, the Agency for Technical Cooperation and Development, and the World Food Programme. She also supported Rwandan refugees returning to their home country. In 2017, there were 100,000 Rwandan refugess in Brazzaville, and Dinga Dzondo said that they would not be forced into returning to Rwanda.

In 2019, Dinga Dzondo announced a deal for around 300 million Congolese francs from the Red Cross Society of China to support flood victims, with another 170 million francs (around 2 million Chinese yuan) promised in the future. In 2020, Dinga Dzondo announced a 12.7 billion francs ($21.3 million) fund to help refugees based in the Congo to survive and return home. She also secured around 760 million francs (around 150 million Japanese yen) in financial aid from Japan. During the COVID-19 pandemic, Dinga Dzondo organised payments of 50,000 Congolese francs to those affected in Brazzaville.

In May 2021, Irène Mboukou was announced as Congo's new Minister of Social Affairs and Humanitarian Action.
