= Antonetta =

Antonetta is a feminine given name that is a variant of Antoinette and Antonia. Notable people who use this name include the following:

- Susanne Antonetta, pen name of Suzanne Paola (born 1956), American poet and author
- Rosa Maria Antonetta Paulina Assing, full name of Rosa Maria Assing (née Varnhagen; 1783 – 1840), German lyric poet, prose-writer, educator, translator and silhouette artist
- Margaretha Maria Antonetta Margriet de Moor (née Neefjes; born 1941), Dutch pianist and writer

== See also ==
- Antoneta Papapavli
- Antonette
- Antonetti
- Antonietta (given name)
