= Maria Antonia =

Maria Antonia may refer to:

== German royalty ==
- Maria Antonia of Austria (1669–1692) daughter of Holy Roman Emperor Leopold
- Duchess Maria Antonia of Bavaria (1724–1780) daughter of Holy Roman Emperor Charles VII
- Maria Antonia Ferdinanda of Spain (1729–1785) daughter of Philip V of Spain
- Archduchess Maria Antonia of Austria (1755–1793) daughter of Holy Roman Emperor Francis I and Empress Maria Theresa; wife of Louis XVI of France
- Archduchess Maria Antonia of Austria (1858–1883) daughter of Ferdinand IV, Grand Duke of Tuscany
- Archduchess Maria Antonia of Austria (1874–1891) daughter of Archduke Karl Salvator of Austria
- Archduchess Maria Antonia of Austria (1899–1977) daughter of Archduke Leopold Salvator of Austria

== Italian royalty ==
- Princess Maria Antonia of Parma (1774–1841) daughter of Ferdinand I of Parma
- Princess Maria Antonia of Naples and Sicily (1784–1806) daughter of Ferdinand I of the Two Sicilies
- Princess Maria Antonia of the Two Sicilies (1814–1898) daughter of Francis I of the Two Sicilies
- Infanta Maria Antonia of Portugal (1862–1959) daughter of Miguel I of Portugal
- Maria Antonia of the Two Sicilies (1898–1957) daughter of Prince Ferdinand Pius, Duke of Castro

== Others ==
- Maria Antonia Pereira (1700–1760), Spanish founder of the carmelite convent of Santiago de Compostela.
- Countess Maria Antonia of Waldstein-Wartenberg (1771–1854) mother of Maria Antonia Koháry de Csábrág
- Princess Maria Antonia Koháry (1797–1862) daughter of Ferencz József Koháry de Csábrág
- Maria Antonia Braile (fl. 1917), Italian-arbëreshë writer
- Maria Antònia Martí, Spanish Catalan linguist
- María Antonia García Vidal de Santo Silas or María África Gracia Vidal, the birthnames credited to Maria Montez (1912 – 1951), Dominican actress
- Maria Antónia Teixeira Rosa, birthname of Mia Rose (born 1988), English-born singer-songwriter
- Toña Is, María Antonia Is Piñera (born 1966), Spanish football manager and former player
- Maria Antônia (born 1969), Brazilian politician

== See also ==
- Mariantonia Samà
- Marie Antoinette (disambiguation)
- María Antonieta, name list
- María Antonietta, name list
- Maria Antonina, name list
- Maria Antonescu
- Maria Antonio of Vicenza
- Maria Antoniou
