= Antonietta =

Antonietta may refer to:

- Antonietta (given name), a female given name
- Antonietta (gastropod), a genus belonging to the taxonomic family Glaucidae of colorful sea slugs
- Antonietta (novel), a 1991 novel by John Hersey
- Antonietta, Venezuelan singer

== See also ==
- Antonieta, a 1982 Spanish film
- Antonia (disambiguation)
- Antonina (disambiguation)
