= Bambama District =

Bambama
- District
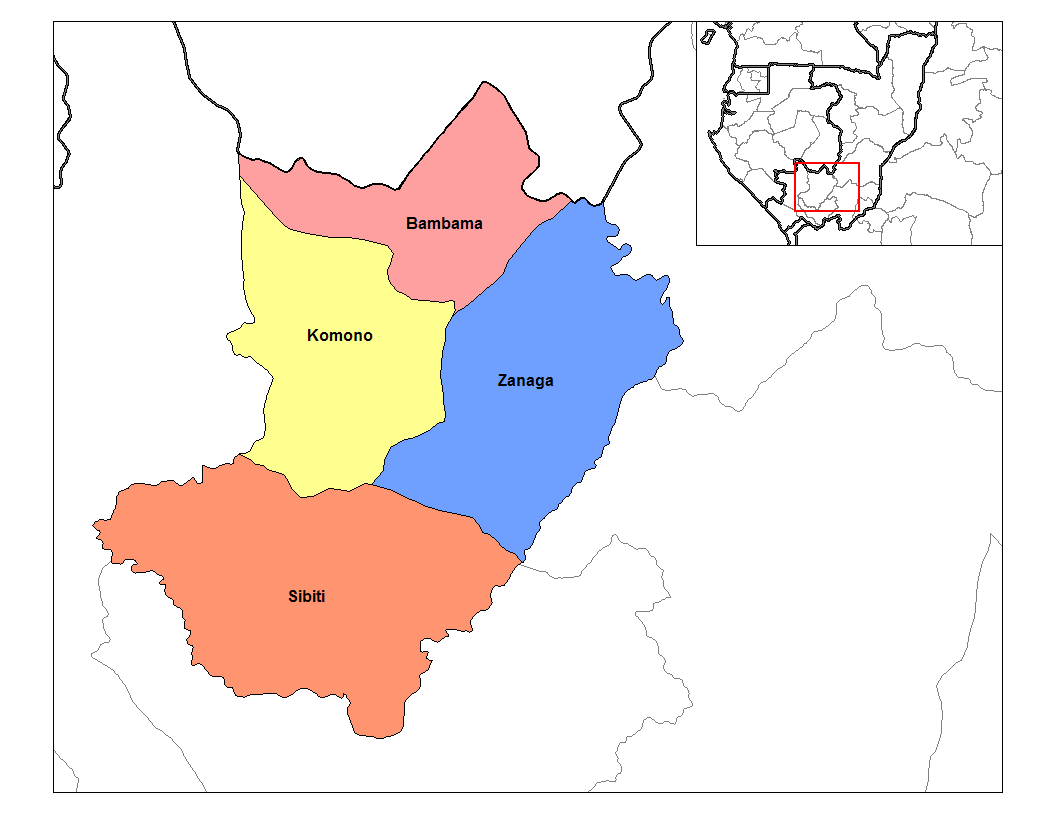
- Bambama District in the region
- Coordinates: 2.537778°S 13.542222°E
- Country: Republic of the Congo
- Department: Lékoumou Department
- Seat: Bambama

Area
  - Total: 1,419 sq mi (3,674 km^{2})
- Elevation: 1,857 ft (566 m)

Population (2023 census)
  - Total: 4,407
  - Density: 3.107/sq mi (1.200/km^{2})
- Time zone: UTC+1 (GMT +1)

Bambama is a district and the smallest in the Lékoumou Region of the Republic of the Congo. The capital lies at Bambama.

== Towns and villages ==
- Bambama
