= Ninette =

Ninette may refer to:

- Ninette (given name), the given name
- Ninette Finch (born 1933), English actress
- Ninette (film), a 2005 Spanish film directed by José Luis Garci
- Ninette (opera), an 1896 opéra comique by Charles Lecocq
- Ninette, Manitoba, an unincorporated community

== See also ==
- Ninetta
