= Theddy Ongoly =

Congolese footballer

Personal information
- Full name: Theddy Ongoly
- Date of birth: March 21, 1981 (age 45)
- Place of birth: Sibiti, Congo
- Height: 6 ft 2 in (1.88 m)
- Position: Defender

Senior career*
Years	Team	Apps	(Gls)
2002–2005	Stade Reims	38	(0)
2006–2009	Angers	35	(2)

International career
- Congo
- * Club domestic league appearances and goals

Theddy Ongoly (born March 21, 1981, in Sibiti, People's Republic of the Congo) is a Congolese defender who played for Angers SCO in Ligue 2. (Note: Theddy Ongoly – French league stats at LFP – also available in French (archived)) On loan from Reims in 2006/2007, he had been definitely bought before the 2007/2008 season.
