= Zanaga District =

Zanaga
- District
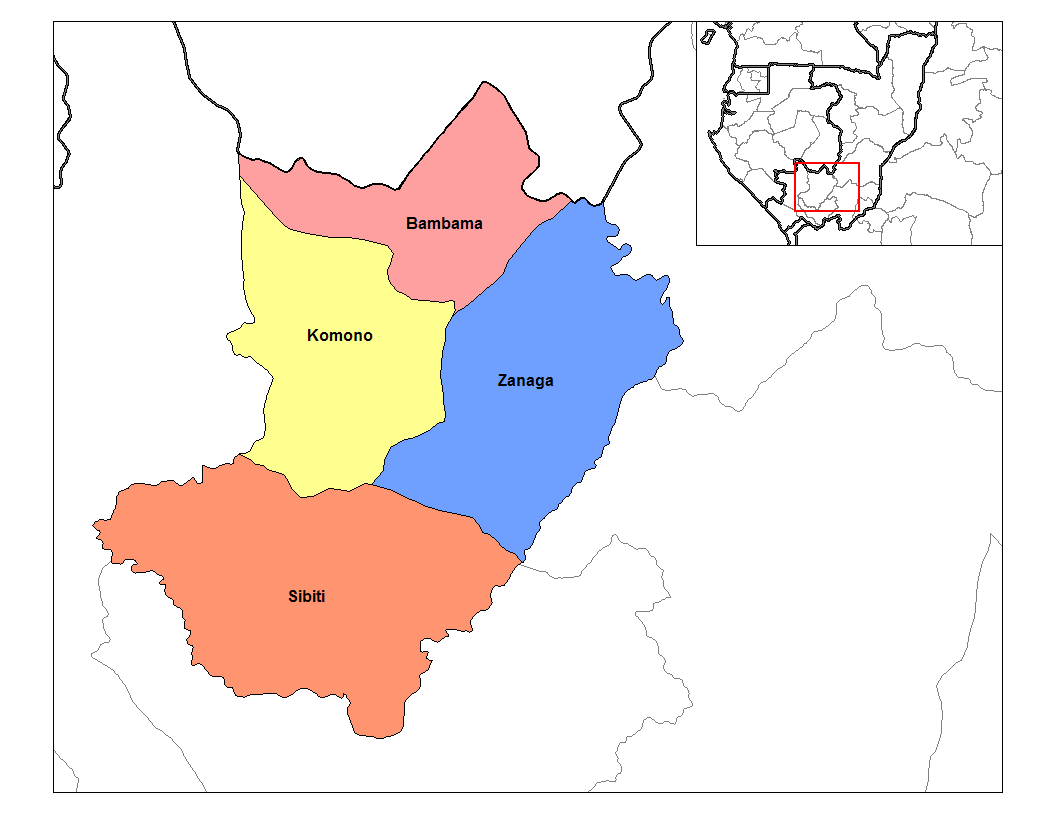
- Zanaga District in the region

- Location within Republic of the Congo
- Coordinates: 2.85°S 13.8233°E
- Country: Republic of the Congo
- Department: Lékoumou Department
- Capital: Zanaga

Area
  - Total: 2,290 sq mi (5,931 km^{2})

Population (2023 census)
  - Total: 16,581
  - Density: 7.241/sq mi (2.796/km^{2})
- Time zone: UTC+1 (GMT +1)

Zanaga is a district in the Lékoumou Region of the Republic of the Congo. The capital lies at Zanaga. The district is known for its substantial iron ore deposits, and the Zanaga Iron Ore Project, which is a significant economic driver for the area.

== History ==
During the European colonial race for Africa in the late 19th century, the French occupied the Congo region. The discovery of mineral resources, especially iron ore, in the middle of the 20th century brought about investment and industrial growth to the region.

== Geography ==
Zanaga is a district in the Lékoumou Region of the Republic of the Congo. The capital and the largest city of Zanaga is approximately 216 km (134 mi) from the national capital Brazzaville, and 232 km (144 mi) from Kinshasa.

Zanaga lies in the basin of the Ogooué River, which empties into Gabon to the north. The region consists of a mix of forests and grasslands. The Ogoué-Leketi National Park was established in 2018 to protect the area. The topography of the Zanaga district includes several mountains, the highest and most prominent of which is Ballouni at an elevation of 762 m (2,500 ft).

== Demographics and economy ==
As per a pre-independence administrative census, the estimated population of the district was 11,316 people. A 2007 census estimated the population to be 16,649. The district is well-known for its substantial iron ore deposits, and the Zanaga Iron Ore Project is a significant potential economic driver for the area. While further development on the project was halted in 2015, it has since secured Chinese investment for further mining and production.
