= Maria Antonina =

Maria Antonina is a feminine compound given name from the root names Miriam and Antonius. Notable people referred to by this name include the following:

- Maria Antonina Kratochwil (1881–1942), Austro-Hungarian beatified martyr
- Maria Antonina Boniecka, known as Maria Boniecka, (1910–1978), Polish author and teacher
- Maria Antonina Czaplicka, known as Maria Czaplicka, (1884–1921), Polish cultural anthropologist

== See also ==
- Maria Antonia (disambiguation)
- María Antonieta
- Maria Antonietta
- Marie Antoinette (given name)
