= Mayéyé District =

Mayéyé
- District
- Interactive map of Mayéyé
- Country: Republic of the Congo
- Department: Lékoumou Department

Area
  - Total: 482 sq mi (1,249 km^{2})

Population (2023 census)
  - Total: 13,239
  - Density: 27.45/sq mi (10.60/km^{2})
- Time zone: UTC+1 (GMT +1)

Mayéyé is a district in the Lékoumou Department of Republic of the Congo.
