= Komono District =

Coordinates: 2°54′S 13°21′E

Komono
- District
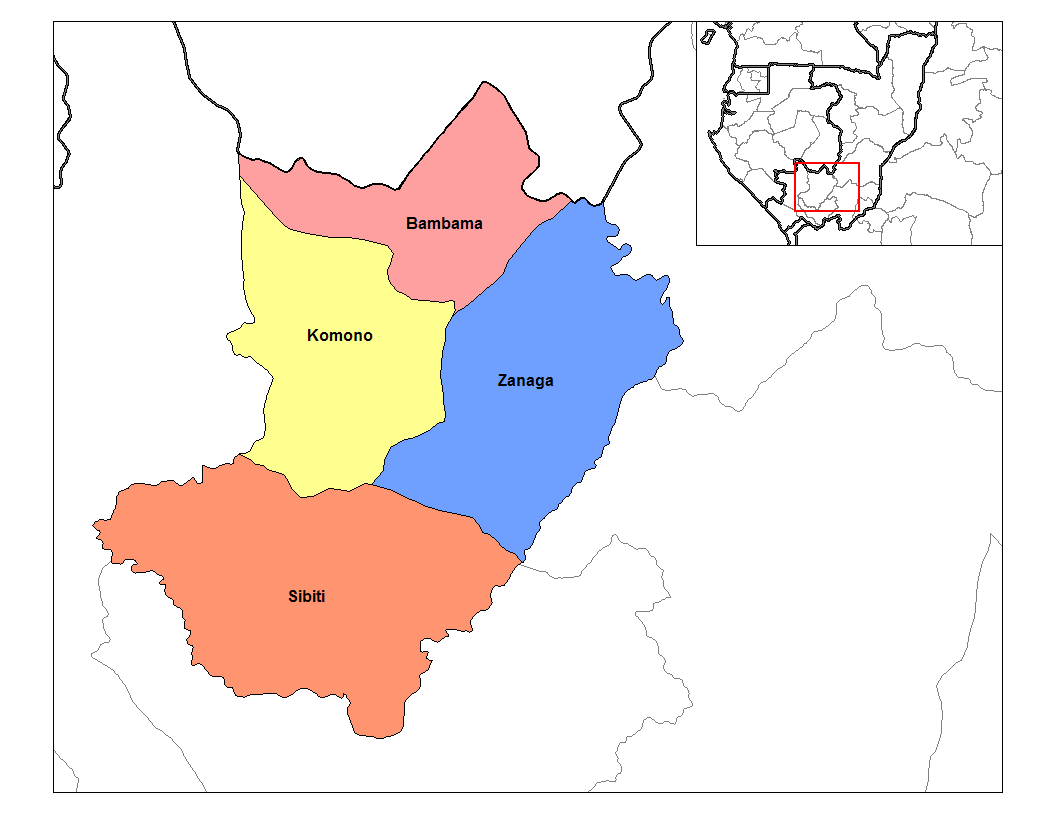
- Komono District in the department
- Country: Republic of the Congo
- Department: Lékoumou

Area
  - Total: 1,778 sq mi (4,606 km^{2})

Population (2023 census)
  - Total: 12,078
  - Density: 6.792/sq mi (2.622/km^{2})
- Time zone: UTC+1 (GMT +1)

Komono is a district in the Lékoumou Department of the Republic of the Congo. The capital lies at Komono.
