= Antonietti =

Antonietti is an Italian surname. Notable people with the surname include:

- Benjamin Antonietti (born 1991), Swiss ice hockey player
- Eliot Antonietti (born 1993), Swiss ice hockey player
- Paola Antonietti (born 1980), Italian mathematician

== See also ==
- Antonietta (given name)
- Antonetti
- Maurizio Antoninetti
