= Sibiti District =

Coordinates: 3.68238°S 13.34329°E

Sibiti
- District
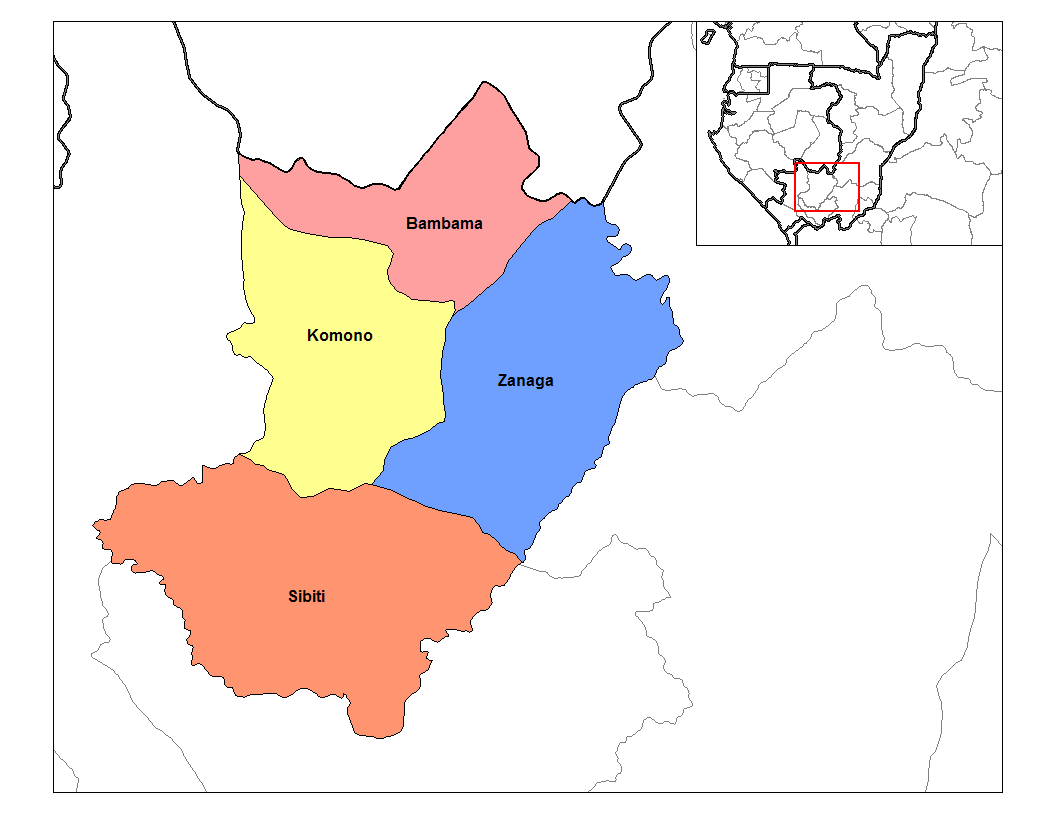
- Sibiti District in the region
- Country: Republic of the Congo
- Department: Lékoumou Department

Area
  - Total: 2,179 sq mi (5,644 km^{2})

Population (2023 census)
  - Total: 54,254
  - Density: 24.90/sq mi (9.613/km^{2})
- Time zone: UTC+1 (GMT +1)

Sibiti is a district in the Lékoumou Department of the Republic of the Congo. The capital lies at Sibiti.
