= Tonette (given name) =

Tonette is a Norwegian and Swedish given name in use in Sweden and Norway whose popularity peaked in the late 1960s. The name is a diminutive form of Antonetta and Antona as well as an alternate form of Tone, Tona and Torny. Notable people with this name include the following:

- Tonette Lopez (died 2006), Filipino transgender activist, HIV/AIDS researcher and journalist
- Tonette S. Rocco (born 1954), American academic
- Tonette Walker (born 1955), American First Lady

== See also ==
- Tonetta (name)
- Antonette
- Tonette, a recorder-like musical instrument
- Tionette Stoddard
