= Tonetta (name) =

Tonetta is a given name, nickname and a surname. Notable people with this name include the following.

== Nickname ==
- Anthony Jeffrey, also known as Tonetta (born 1949), Canadian entertainer

== Surname ==
- Elena Tonetta (born 1988), Italian archer

== Places ==
- Tonetta Lake, American lake, located in Southeast, New York.

== See also ==
- Tonette (given name)
