= Sibiti Airport =

- IATA: SIB; ICAO: FCBS

Summary
- Airport type: Public
- Serves: Sibiti, Republic of the Congo
- Elevation AMSL: 1,883 ft / 574 m
- Coordinates: 3°41′12″S 13°22′20″E

Map
- Location of airport in the Republic of the Congo

Runways
Direction	Length		Surface
Direction	m	ft	Surface
10/28	2,045	6,709	Asphalt
- Source: GCM Google Maps

Sibiti Airport (IATA: SIB, ICAO: FCBS) is an airport serving the city of Sibiti, Republic of the Congo. The airport is just east of the city. It replaces the former airstrip 10 kilometres (6.2 mi) southeast of town.

The runway has an additional 90 metres (300 ft) of paved overrun on each end.

== See also ==
- List of airports in the Republic of the Congo
- Transport in the Republic of the Congo
