= Maria Antonietta =

Maria Antonietta is a feminine Italian blended given name from the root names Miriam and Antonius. Notable people referred to by this name include the following:

- Princess Maria Antonietta of Bourbon-Two Sicilies (1851–1938) daughter of Francis, Count of Trapani and Maria Isabella of Austria
- Maria Antonietta (singer) (born 1987), Italian singer-songwriter
- Maria Antonietta Avanzo (1889-1977), first Italian female racetrack driver
- Maria Antonietta Beluzzi (1930–1997), Italian actress
- María Antonietta Berriozábal (born 1941), American activist
- Maria Antonietta Macciocchi (1922–2007) was an Italian journalist, writer, feminist and politician
- Maria Antonietta Picconi (1869–1926), Italian composer and pianist
- Maria Antonietta Torriani, Italian journalist and fiction writer

== See also ==
- Maria Antonia (disambiguation)
- María Antonieta
- Maria Antonina
- Marie Antoinette (disambiguation)
