= María Antonieta =

María Antonieta may refer to:

- María Antonieta Cámpoli (born 1955), Miss Venezuela in 1972
- María Antonieta Collins (born 1952), Mexican journalist, TV host and author of
- María Antonieta de Bográn (born 1955), former 1st Vice President of Honduras (2010–2014)
- María Antonieta de las Nieves, stage name of María Antonieta Gómez-Rodríguez, (born 1950), Mexican actress, comedian, and singer
- María Antonieta Duque (born 1970), Venezuelan TV presenter, comedian and actress
- María Antonieta Gutiérrez Venezuelan telenovelas script writer
- María Antonieta Hernández (born 1958), Mexican gymnast
- María Antonieta Pérez Reyes (born 1963), Mexican politician
- María Antonieta Pons (1922–2004), Cuban-born Mexican film actress and dancer
- María Antonieta Rodríguez Mata (born 1969), Mexican former police officer and convicted drug lord
- María Antonieta Alva (born 1985), Peruvian Finance Minister

== See also ==
- Marie Antoinette (disambiguation)
- Maria Antonia
- María Antonietta
- Maria Antonina
