= Zanaga =

- Location in the Republic of the Congo
- Coordinates: 2°51′0″S 13°49′24″E
- Country: Republic of the Congo
- Department: Lékoumou
- District: Zanaga
- Elevation: 1,870 ft (570 m)

Population (2023)
  - Total: 3,588

Zanaga is a village and the capital of Zanaga District in the Lékoumou Department of southern Republic of the Congo.

It lies near the Ogooue River, which flows north into Gabon.

== Mining ==
The village is near Zanaga mine, a potential 3 billion tonne iron ore deposit.

== Transport ==
The village is served by Zanaga Airport.

== See also ==
- Railway stations in Congo
