= Zanaga Airport =

- IATA: ANJ; ICAO: FCBZ

Summary
- Airport type: Public
- Serves: Zanaga, Republic of the Congo
- Elevation AMSL: 1,870 ft / 570 m
- Coordinates: 2°50′50″S 13°49′15″E

Map
- Location of airport in the Republic of the Congo

Runways
Direction	Length		Surface
Direction	m	ft	Surface
08/26	1,205	3,953	Dirt
- Source: GCM Google Maps

Zanaga Airport (IATA: ANJ, ICAO: FCBZ) is an airport serving Zanaga, a town in the Lékoumou Department of the Republic of the Congo. The runway is adjacent to the north side of the town.

== See also ==
- List of airports in the Republic of the Congo
- Transport in the Republic of the Congo
