= Antoinette Montaigne =

French politician (born 1965)

Minister of Communication, Civics, Dialogue, and National Reconciliation
- In office 27 January 2014 – 22 August 2014
- President: Catherine Samba-Panza
- Prime Minister: André Nzapayeké
- Preceded by: Christophe Gazam Betty
- Succeeded by: Victor Wake (communication)

Personal details
- Born: Antoinette Moussa; 18 January 1965 (age 61) Bangassou, Central African Republic
- Citizenship: CAR
- Party: Union for a Popular Movement

Antoinette Montaigne is a politician with dual French and Central African citizenship. A lawyer with expertise in children's rights, she served as a city councillor in the suburbs of Paris in France. In 2014, Montaigne was invited to the Central African Republic to become Minister of Communication, Civics, Dialogue, and National Reconciliation in the interim government. She remained there after she left the government and now runs the Central African Peace Academy.

== France ==
Antoinette Montaigne is a lawyer specialising in children's rights and child soldiers. She has a doctorate in juvenile criminal law from Paris' Panthéon-Assas University and practised law in France.

Montaigne lived in Bussy-Saint-Georges, Seine-et-Marne, from 2001 until 2014. From March 2008 to 2014 she was a Union for a Popular Movement city councillor holding the portfolio for legal and social mediation and decentralised cooperation. The mayor of Bussy-Saint-Georges described her as "a pugnacious and courageous woman". Montaigne was president of the Council of Central Africans Abroad and established two organisations to support CAR citizens overseas, Zagaro Montaigne and DIPE Coaching and Consulting. In February 2013 she proposed that the council pass a motion of solidarity with the victims of the Central African Republic Civil War (2012–2014).

== Central African Republic ==
Montaigne is a close friend of 2014–2016 Interim President of the Central African Republic (CAR) Catherine Samba-Panza. In early 2014, the interim prime minister, André Nzapayeké, invited her to return to the CAR to take up an appointment as Minister of Communication, Civics, Dialogue, and National Reconciliation in his government. Montaigne accepted and flew from Paris to Bangui, the CAR capital, on 28 January – she was still a city councillor at the time. On 30 March 2014 she signed an appeal to all Central Africans to put down their weapons and enter negotiations. To demonstrate the spirit of co-operation, Montaigne attended prayers at a mosque in the Muslim quarter of Bangui. She visited the Ivory Coast in October 2016 to learn about their model of reconciliation following the Second Ivorian Civil War.

Montaigne left her ministerial position by the end of October, but remained as an adviser to the president. She spoke on the role of women in society at a Gabonese Council in France event at the Gabonese Embassy, Paris in May 2016. Montaign is now head of the CAR Peace Academy.
