= Antoinette Lubaki =

Congolese painter

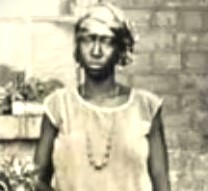
- Lubaki in 1926
- Born: 1895; Bukama, Congo Free State
- Died: unknown
- Other names: Atoinet Lubaki, Atoinet Mfumbi
- Occupation: Artist

Antoinette Lubaki (Atoinet Lubaki, Atoinet Mfumbi) (Bukama, Congo Free State) (1895-?) was a Congolese watercolourist, and Congo's first known female artist. She is considered one of the forerunners of modern art in Congo, alongside her husband, painter and ivory worker Albert Lubaki and the tailor-painter Djilatento. The Lubakis are thought to be the first artists in Congo to create their works on paper.

== Early life ==
Antoinette Lubaki was the daughter of the village chief of Bukama, then in Shaba (Katanga) province, which is why she is sometimes referred to as "princess". She was married to Albert Lubaki, an ivory worker, and they lived in Elisabethville (now Lubumbashi).

== Career ==
In 1926, Georges Thiry, an administrator in the Belgian Congo, was travelling on a mission and noticed the beautiful images made from charcoal, kaolin and clay on the walls of huts in Bukama. These had been made by Antoinette Lubaki and her husband Albert. Thiry was a lover of modern art, and asked the Lubakis to recreate the decorations and make other work on paper in order to "perpetuate this ephemeral art". To this end, he provided them with paper and watercolours, candles to light their work, and the promise to buy up all their watercolours.

Thiry then transferred the Lubakis' work to Gaston-Denys Perier, an executive officer at the Ministry of Colonies, who was a collector of Congolese art.

Perier recognised the artistic value of the works and decided to show Antoinette and Albert Lubaki's work in Europe. The Lubakis and another artist Djilatendo became the first Congolese artists whose works on paper reached Europe. Their works were traded there for Western art market by Perier, who also kept a large collection for himself. The Lubakis were completely unaware of this, and were even surprised that Thiry was interested in their works.

Antoinette Lubaki mainly made figurative works of scenes from everyday life and depictions of local legends. She worked without perspective, background or shadow. Nature and animals from the surrounding area were added in a poetic way. From the edge of the paper, she sometimes made a frame in which all kinds of figures were present. The use of colours was also purely based on her imagination and far away from realism. She often signed her work "Antoinet". The Lubakis started making watercolours at night, as cultural practices dictated that no stories were allowed to be told during the day.

== Reception ==
Their work has been described as Outsider art. It is sometimes difficult to make out which of the Lubakis created which art work. Antoinette Lubaki's name was not always mentioned in exhibitions that include her works. Sometimes only her husband Albert Lubaki or only the family name Lubaki is mentioned.

Antoinette and Albert Lubaki are often mentioned alongside tailor and artist Tshyela Ntendu, called "Djilatendo" by Thiry, whom he had met in 1927 in a village in Kasaï in a similar manner to the Kubakis. He worked with Djilatendo in a similar fashion to the Lubakis. Their first exhibition of 163 watercolours took place in 1929, when the Centre for Fine Arts in Brussels was inaugurated. In 1930, their work was exhibited at the Ethnographic Museum in Geneva and in 1931 at the Galerie Charles-Auguste Girard Gallery in Paris.

The works of Djilatendo, who made mostly geometric motifs and animals, were hung at an exhibition at the Galerie du Centaure in Brussels in 1931 alongside those of René Magritte and Paul Delvaux, but the Lubakis were not represented. The Lubakis vanished from the Western art world as their backers Thiry and Perier fell out, and false accusations were made that their works were made by a European impostor.

Nothing further is known about Antoinette Lubaki, including her date of death. In 1949, the Lubaki's works were once again present at Geert Van Bruaene's Gallery "L'Agneau moustique" in Brussels, a gallery owner who had an eye for emerging talent. Many of Antoinette Lubaki's paintings and drawings have been lost.

== Exhibitions ==
- 1929: Primitive Arts and Popular Arts, Centre for Fine Arts, Brussels.
- 1930: Ethnographic Museum in Geneva.
- 1931: Galerie Charles-Auguste Girard Gallery in Paris.
- 1949: Gallery "L'Agneau moustique" by Geert Van Bruaene in Brussel.
- 2015: Beauté Congo 1926-2015 Congo Kitoko, Fondation Cartier pour l'Art Contemporain.
- 2022: Venice Biennale.
- 2023: Modern Congo 1930-1960, MAGNIN-A Gallery, Paris.
