= Antoinette Arnold Hawley =

American temperance activist, leader (1842–1919)

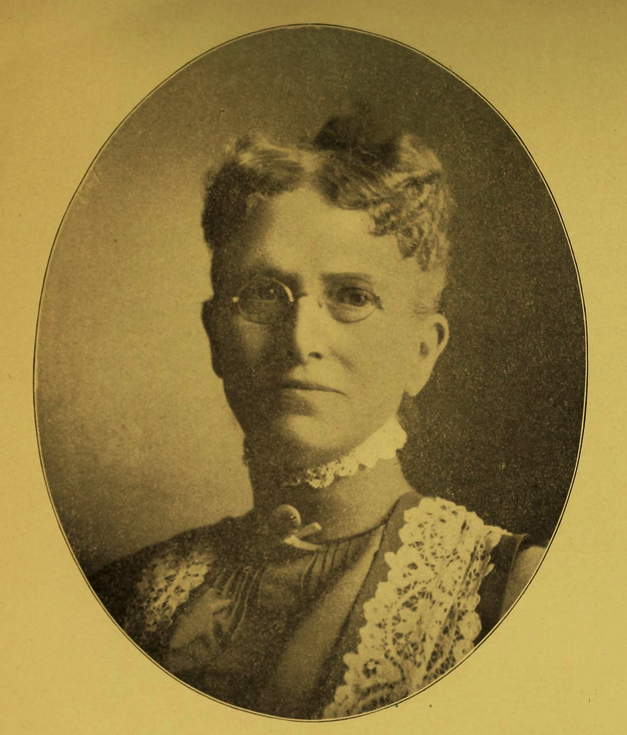
- Portrait photo from The passing of the saloon, 1908
- Born: Antoinette A. Arnold; January 23, 1842; Rochester, New York, U.S.
- Died: August 12, 1919 (aged 77); Boulder, Colorado, U.S.
- Other name: Antoinette Elgan
- Occupations: educator; activist
- Known for: President, Colorado Woman's Christian Temperance Union
- Notable work: “The Crusade Glory Song"
- Spouses: James A. Elgan (m. 1874; div. 1881); Theodore Hawley (m. 1883; died 1911)

Antoinette Arnold Hawley (née, Arnold; after first marriage, Elgan; after second marriage, Hawley; 1842–1919) was an American educator and temperance activist. She served as President of the Colorado Woman's Christian Temperance Union (WCTU) (1899–1904). Nominated for Mayor of Denver, Colorado on the Prohibition ticket in 1900, Hawley was the first woman to run for Mayor in that city.

== Early life and education ==
Antoinette A. Arnold was born in Rochester, New York, January 23, 1842.

She was educated in private schools and at Tracy Female Institute, Rochester, graduating from the latter in 1864.

== Career ==
In 1865, she removed to Michigan where she spent some years in teaching. Later, she taught in Minneapolis, Minnesota, and on her removal to that city, she became active in the work of the WCTU. Hawley took part in the Women's Crusade of 1873–74.

Following her removal to Iowa, she renewed her interest in the local WCTU, and four years later she was elected president of the Tenth District. Successive removals carried her to Kansas City, Missouri, and Denver, Colorado. In the former place, she was elected president of the Twelfth Missouri District of the WCTU, and, after becoming established in Denver, her interest in the work in several positions, her outstanding ability, and her unflagging zeal led to her election as State president of the Colorado WCTU in 1899. She continued to occupy this position for successive years until failing health compelled her retirement. She was then made honorary president. For about five years, she also served as editor of The Messenger, the official organ of the Colorado WCTU.

Hawley was an able speaker, and a writer of some spirited verse. One of the best known of her lyrics is “The Crusade Glory Song". She was a Charter Member of the Daughters of the American Revolution. She was also a member of Woman's Press Club, Woman's Public Service League, Denver Woman's Club, Equal Suffrage Association, and the Plymouth Congregational Church.

== Personal life ==
On April 21, 1874, in Sangamon County, Illinois, she married James A. Elgan. They had two children: Sylvia Sarah (1875–1880) and Paul Brewster (1879–1880). After Mr. Elgan ran off to Hawaii in 1880, Mrs. Elgan filed for divorce, which was granted in the following year.

On October 24, 1883, in Romeo, Michigan, she married Judge Theodore Hawley (1827–1911), of Fort Dodge, Iowa.

Hawley toured the world at the age of 71. She died at a sanitarium in Boulder, Colorado, August 12, 1919. Burial was at Fort Dodge.
