= Antonette Ruth Sabel =

American music educator, composer and arts administrator

Antonette Ruth Sabe
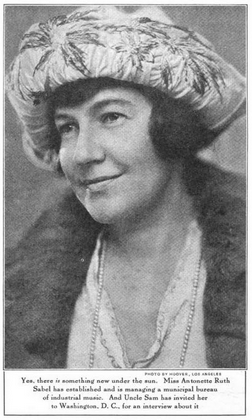
- Born: April 23, 1894
- Died: April 6, 1974 (aged 79)
- Occupations: Music educator; composer; arts administrator

Antonette Ruth Sabel (April 23, 1894 – April 6, 1974), also seen as Antoinette Ruth Sabel, was an American music educator, composer, and arts administrator. She founded and directed the first "municipal bureau of industrial music" in the United States, in Los Angeles, California.

== Early life ==
Antonette Ruth "Nettie" Sabelwitz had her early education in Wisconsin, with further musical studies in Chicago. Her sister Elsbeth Sara Sabel Mahan was also in music education, as head of the music department at the Washington State normal school in Ellensburg, Washington.

== Career ==
Sabel was head of the music department at Pasadena High School until she resigned in 1919. In 1918, she was chosen to dress as the Statue of Liberty and sing "The Star-Spangled Banner" at the Rose Bowl, an early instance of the national anthem being performed at American football events. Later in 1918, she became the second woman commissioned by the War Department as "camp musical director", when she served in that position at the Arcadia Balloon Camp and March Field in Riverside, California.

In 1921, Sabel established a "municipal bureau of industrial music", tasked with developing musical groups among the city's workers, including choruses, glee clubs, brass bands, and orchestras. It was the first endeavor of its kind in the United States, and was commended by the Secretary of Labor and the National Federation of Music Clubs. The bureau operated under the auspices of the Los Angeles Chamber of Commerce, as "a wholesome outlet for expression of the individual", intended to improve workplace morale and efficiency. She directed a "Pageant of Progress" for "Theodore Thomas Day" in 1922. She compiled a booklet about the bureau's work, Culture and the Community (1927), as a record and a guide for other municipalities. She also served as executive secretary of the Los Angeles Music Federation, and in that work led fundraising for summer concerts at the Hollywood Bowl.

Songs composed by Sabel included "We're One for Uncle Sam" (1917, with words by Robert Freeman). Although she wrote and performed popular music, she considered jazz music "sordid" and did not include jazz in concerts performed under her bureau's direction.

== Personal life ==
Antonette Sabel married lawyer Walter Kilbourne Tuller in 1930, as his second wife. She was widowed when he died in 1939. Antonette Ruth Sabel died in 1974, just before her 80th birthday.
