= Antoinette Bonner =

Romanian American jewel thief (1892–1920)

- Born: 1892; Romania
- Died: 1920 (aged 27–28); New York City, New York, U.S.
- Cause of death: Suicide by potassium cyanide poisoning
- Other names: Queen of Diamonds; Miss Amethyst; The Queen of Confidence Women
- Occupation: Jewel thief
- Years active: 1911–1920
- Known for: Large-scale jewelry thefts
- Status: Acquitted (1914), Charged (1920)
- Criminal charges: Grand larceny
- Accomplice: Joseph B. Brescher

Antoinette Bonner (1892–1920) was a Romanian American jewel thief. Acting as an agent for diamond merchants from New York's Maiden Lane, she sold jewelry to wealthy society women and came to be known as the "Queen of Diamonds". Born in Romania, she learned the appraisal of gems from her father and later immigrated to the United States. In 1913, she was charged with grand larceny after failing to pay for $150,000 to $250,000 of jewelry she had acquired on memorandum from around ten separate diamond brokers. She fled to France and was arrested in Paris in 1914. Following her extradition to the United States, she was acquitted of the charges. Later in 1920, she was again charged with stealing jewels in Manhattan. When the police came to an office at Park Row Building to place her under arrest, she cried "you'll never take me alive" and swallowed a vial of potassium cyanide, killing herself.

== Early life ==
Antoinette Bonner was born in Romania in 1892. Her father and other men in her family were jewel dealers. From the age of six, she was taught how to appraise jewels, including how to determine their color and clarity. She immigrated to the United States and was recognized as an expert in the trade by the time she reached the age of 20. Bonner was described as attractive and a "woman of some personal charm".

== Career ==
=== Beginnings ===
Bonner was active in the jewelry trade in New York as early as 1911. She became associated with Joseph B. Brescher, a fellow immigrant from Romania who had been in the jewelry business for years. He and Bonner went into business together, eventually establishing offices in the Marbridge Building on Broadway. Brescher (who also used the surname Kislinger) had filed for bankruptcy in March 1912. Together, Bonner and Brescher built up a reputation for honesty and punctuality with several New York jewel dealers. They made use of the memoranda system, then common among diamond merchants, whereby gems were given to agents "on memorandum" and the cash value or the merchandise would later be returned on demand.

=== Jewelry theft and escape to France ===
By 1913, Bonner and Brescher had arrangements with several diamond merchants. One of their largest clients was Francis E. Cocks, a diamond broker in New York. Bonner sold jewelry she acquired from Cocks that was worth hundreds to thousands of dollars to clients who she said were wealthy society women. In the later half of 1913, Cocks had given $183,000 worth of jewels to the pair, much of which he himself had obtained on memorandum. Bonner and Brescher had paid $105,000 to Cocks, but were delinquent in returning the final $78,000. In October 1913, Cocks' creditors demanded return of the jewels. He was unable to produce them and was placed under arrest.

A grand jury heard the case on November 14, 1913, with Cocks explaining that Bonner and Brescher had taken the jewels on memorandum. At least nine other diamond merchants were called before the grand jury and it was discovered that upwards of $150,000 of jewels were unaccounted for. Meanwhile, neither Brescher nor Bonner had been heard from since October 31. Bonner had wired $7000 to herself in Paris and Brescher was believed to be travelling to Bucharest, where he was from. Bonner, Brescher, and his brother were found to have sold some of the missing jewelry to a pawn shop. More of the jewelry was found at other pawn shops and another three men were involved in their sale. Within two days, an order for her arrest was issued by the district attorney. An article in the New York Times indicated that Bonner and Brescher had disappeared with $150,000 to $250,000 from firms on Maiden Lane. According to an attorney representing the jewellers that she defrauded, Bonner had legitimately sold around $1 million in jewels in the two years prior to fleeing the country. She was given colorful nicknames in newspapers, including the "Queen of Diamonds", "Miss Amethyst", and "The Queen of Confidence Women".

=== Arrest and extradition ===
An international manhunt for Bonner and Brescher was conducted by both police and private detectives hired by the diamond merchants. The pair evaded authorities until they were finally arrested in Paris in May 1914. Their extradition was postponed due to the outbreak of World War I. On a charge of grand larceny of a $685 lavallière they were acquitted due to a faulty indictment. In her testimony, Bonner said that she had merely gone to Europe to find purchasers for the gemstones. The pair were held for trail on other indictments, but the charges were eventually dropped after much of the merchandise was recovered from pawn shops.

=== Second arrest and suicide ===
Bonner continued her association with Brescher following their acquittal. In 1920 she procured 75 uncut gems worth $2000 from a dealer from the New York Novelty Company. The dealer, unable to secure compensation, reported her to the police. They arrived at Brescher's offices on the 14th floor of the Park Row Building on March 5, 1920, to arrest her on charges of grand larceny. Upon her arrest, she wrenched free from the clutches of the detective and cried out "you'll never take me alive" before pulling a vial of potassium cyanide out of her handbag and swallowing the poison. (Note: Some sources refer to the poison she used as strychnine.) An ambulance was called that took her to Volunteer Hospital, and she died there, having already become moribund. She was 32. In her handbag, police found several hundred dollars in cash and about $30,000 worth of diamonds.
