= Antonietta (given name) =

- Pronunciation: Italian: [antoˈnjetta]
- Gender: Female
- Language: Italian

Origin
- Region of origin: Italy

Other names
- Nickname: Toni
- Related names: Antoine, Antoinette, Antony, Tony, Antonio, Antonius, Antonella, Antonia

Antonietta is an Italian given name that is a diminutive form of Antonia. Notable people with this name include the following:

== People ==
- Maria Antonietta Beluzzi (1930–1997), Italian born actress
- Antonietta Brandeis (1849–1920), Austrian painter
- Antonietta Di Martino (born 1978), Italian high jumper
- Antonietta Marini-Rainieri (19th century), Italian operatic soprano
- Antonietta Meneghel (1893–1975), stage name Toti Dal Monte, Italian operatic soprano
- Antonietta Meo (1930–1937), Venerable Italian child
- Antonietta Pastori (born 1929), Italian operatic soprano
- Maria Antonietta Picconi (born 1869), Italian composer and pianist
- Antonietta Raphael (1895–1975), Italian sculptor and painter
- Antonietta Stella (1929–2022), Italian operatic soprano

=== Royalty ===
- Isabella Maria Luisa Antonietta Ferdinanda Giuseppina Saveria Domenica Giovanna, Princess Isabella of Parma (1741–1763)
- Maria Antonietta Anna of the Two Sicilies (1814–1898), Grand Duchess of Tuscany from 1833 to 1859 as the consort of Leopold II
- Maria Antonietta of Naples (1784–1806), Spanish crown princess
- Maria Antonietta of Spain (1729–1785), Infanta of Spain
- Princess Maria Antonietta of Bourbon-Two Sicilies (1851–1938), Princess of Bourbon-Two Sicilies by birth and by her marriage to Prince Alfonso

== See also ==
- Antonetta
- Antoinette, another form of the feminine given name
- Antonieta (given name)
- Antonietti
