= Antoinette Flegenheim =

Survivor of the sinking of the Titanic (1863–1943)

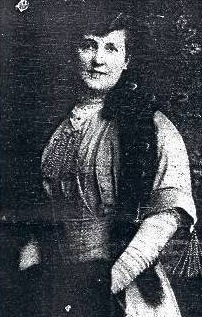
- Born: Berta Antonia Maria Wendt; 11 May 1863; Himmelpfort, Kingdom of Prussia
- Died: 8 April 1943 (aged 79); Frankfurt, Nazi Germany

Antoinette "Tony" Flegenheim (11 May 1863 – 8 April 1943) was a survivor of the sinking of the RMS Titanic.

== Early life ==
Flegenheim was born Berta Antonia Maria Wendt on 11 May 1863 in Himmelpfort near Berlin, Kingdom of Prussia. Her parents were Wilhelm and Pauline Wendt.

In 1890, she moved to New York and married a fellow German, Alfred Flegenheim. Alfred died on 23 November 1907. Flegenheim was wealthy and possessed residences both in Berlin and Manhattan.

== Sinking of Titanic ==
Flegenheim was one of the 281 passengers who boarded RMS Titanic on 10 April 1912 when it took its first stop in Cherbourg, France. She travelled in first class. The vessel would take one more stop in Queenstown, Ireland before the ill-fated transatlantic crossing. On 14 April 1912, Titanic collided with an iceberg on its maiden voyage in the North Atlantic Ocean.

At 00:45 on 15 April 1912, Flegenheim departed Titanic with 27 others on Lifeboat No. 7, the first to be lowered. The lifeboat was deployed without its plug and began to take on water which, as fellow lifeboat occupant Dorothy Gibson put it, was "remedied" by lingerie and garments being stuffed into the hole.

Flegenheim and the other Lifeboat No. 7 occupants were rescued approximately four hours after they were lowered from Titanic by RMS Carpathia.

== Later life ==
Soon after the sinking of Titanic, on 20 June 1912, Flegenheim married Briton Paul Elliot Whitehurst (born c. 1878).

She and Whitehurst lived in The Hague, Netherlands during the First World War but the two separated in this period.

Flegenheim died in Frankfurt, Nazi Germany on 8 April 1943.
