= Antoinette Chahine =

Lebanese activist (born 1971 or 1972)

- Born: 1971 or 1972 (age 53–54); Lebanon
- Citizenship: Lebanon; France (naturalised)
- Occupation: Activist

Antoinette Chahine (born 1971 or 1972) is a Lebanese activist against the death penalty and torture.

== Biography ==
Antoinette Chahine was falsely accused at the age of 22 of taking part in an attack and the murder of a priest in Lebanon in 1994. She was arrested on 21 March 1994, for a crime of which her brother, a member of the Lebanese Forces who was in exile at the time, was accused by the Lebanese state. She was sentenced to death in 1997. After being tortured and imprisoned for five years, she was finally released on 24 June 1999, due to the efforts of NGOs, including Amnesty International and Action by Christians for the Abolition of Torture (ACAT), as well as her lawyer, which led to a new trial.

Her conviction was based on two testimonies extracted under torture, which were later retracted.

On 25 June 2001, she took part in the First World Congress Against the Death Penalty, which brought together abolitionist activists such as Philippe Maurice, the last Frenchman to be sentenced to death (pardoned by François Mitterrand in 1981), Kerry Max Cook, and Sakae Menda, for three days in Strasbourg.

Today, she works alongside Amnesty International, raising public awareness of the death penalty and torture by telling her story. She raises awareness of her struggle by meeting students and young detainees.

== Works ==
- Crime d’innocence, 2007
