= Antoinette de Beaucaire =

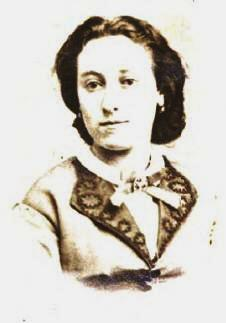
Portrait of Antoinette de Beaucaire

Antoinette de Beaucaire or Marie-Antoinette Rivière (21 January 1840 in Nîmes, France – 27 January 1865) was an Occitan language writer. Her works include Li Velugo or "The Sparklets."

== Biography ==
Marie-Antoinette Rivière, félibresse du lierre - félibresse de l'Éurre - under the name Antounieto de Bèu-Caire (Antoinette de Beaucaire), born in Nîmes and died in Beaucaire, wrote twenty-five poems during her short life. Some were published in the Armana prouvençau (1865); with the dates of the manuscripts: Perqué? Bèu-Caire, 15 de setèmbre 1864; Lis ieu de l'enfant Jésu: 20 de setèmbre 1864; Moun Iroundello mai 1864.

Engaged to Gustave Germain, she learns that he is going into the priesthood When Antoinette was told that Gustave was leaving for the Seminary in Nîmes, she despaired: "No, no," she said, "he won't stay there, he knows what he promised me, he knows how much I love him, and I know how much he loves me! Inconsolable, she weakened and died of a fluxion of the chest. Louis Roumieux collected Antoinette's poems and took charge of publishing them.
