= Sibiti =

- Location in the Republic of the Congo
- Coordinates: 3°41′6″S 13°21′4″E
- Country: Republic of the Congo
- Department: Lékoumou Department
- District: Sibiti District
- Commune: Sibiti
- Elevation: 440 m (1,440 ft)

Population (2023 census)
  - Total: 33,887

Sibiti is a town and a commune located in the Lékoumou department of the Republic of the Congo 300 km west of Brazzaville. It is also the department's capital and Sibiti District seat.

The town is served by Sibiti Airport. It also houses Stade de Sibiti, a multi-use stadium that holds 7,000 people.

== Climate ==
Climate data for Sibiti (1991-2020)
Month	Jan	Feb	Mar	Apr	May	Jun	Jul	Aug	Sep	Oct	Nov	Dec	Year
Mean daily maximum °C (°F)	28.7 (83.7)	29.2 (84.6)	30.2 (86.4)	29.9 (85.8)	28.4 (83.1)	25.4 (77.7)	24.4 (75.9)	25.1 (77.2)	26.6 (79.9)	28.6 (83.5)	28.2 (82.8)	28.4 (83.1)	27.8 (82.0)
Daily mean °C (°F)	24.2 (75.6)	24.7 (76.5)	25.1 (77.2)	24.9 (76.8)	24.4 (75.9)	22.2 (72.0)	21.1 (70.0)	21.4 (70.5)	22.7 (72.9)	24.2 (75.6)	24.1 (75.4)	24.1 (75.4)	23.6 (74.5)
Average precipitation mm (inches)	157.3 (6.19)	156.6 (6.17)	200.6 (7.90)	208.5 (8.21)	116.4 (4.58)	8.7 (0.34)	5.0 (0.20)	8.2 (0.32)	31.4 (1.24)	158.3 (6.23)	309.9 (12.20)	223.3 (8.79)	1,584.2 (62.37)
Source: NOAA

== Notable people ==
- Theddy Ongoly, footballer
