= Championnat de France Amateur (1935–1971) =

Defunct football league in France

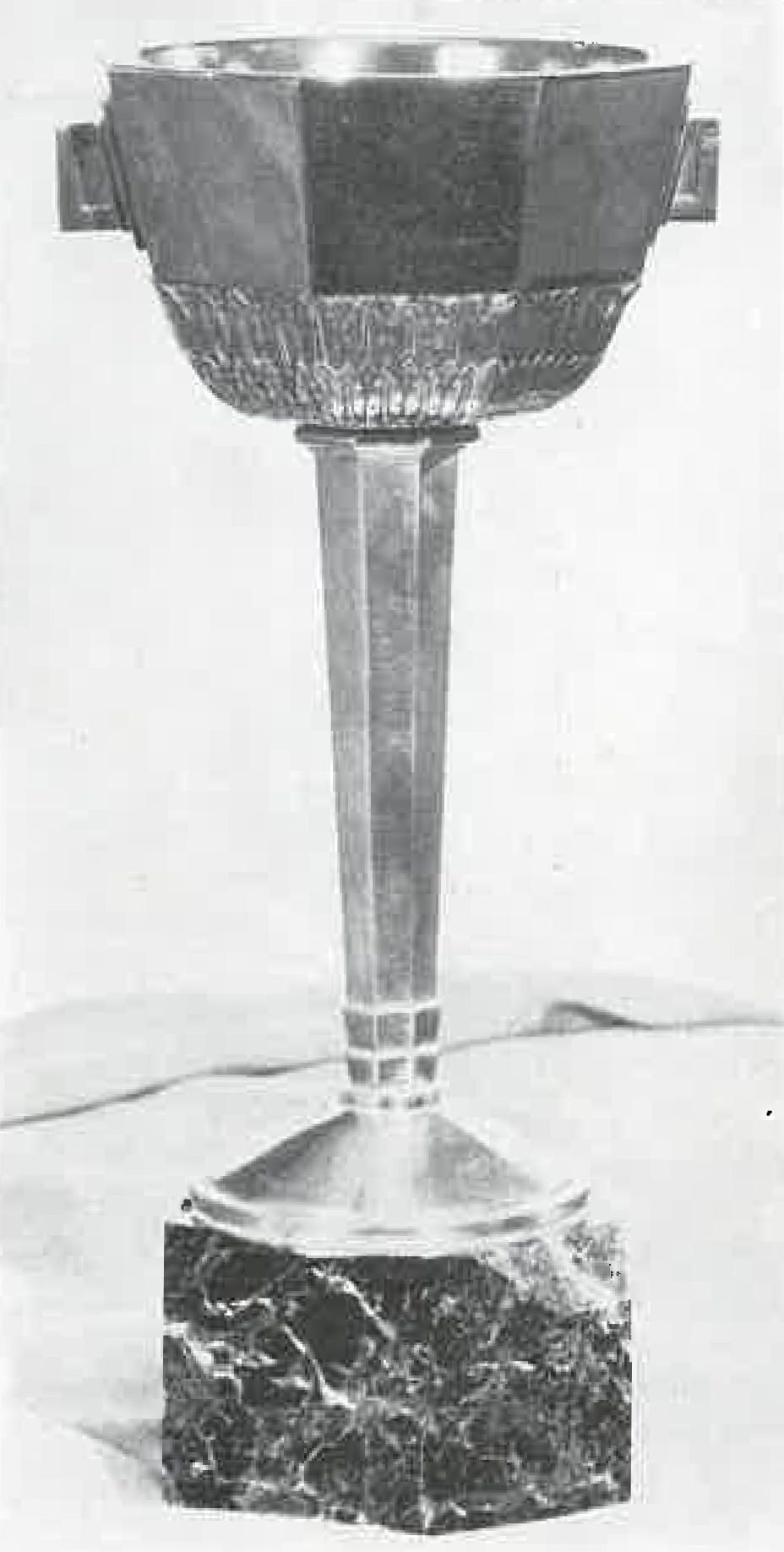
- The trophy of the competition
- Organising body: French Football Federation
- Founded: 1935
- Folded: 1971
- Replaced by: Division 3
- Country: France
- Other club from: Monaco
- Level on pyramid: 1 (of amateur football); 3 (de facto, 1948–1971)
- Relegation to: Division d'Honneur (1948–1971)
- Most championships: Quevilly; Gazélec Ajaccio (4 titles each)

The Championnat de France Amateur (CFA), also known as the Challenge Jules‒Rimet, was the highest level of amateur football in France from 1935 to 1971. Organized by the French Football Federation, it was the de facto third tier in the French football league system from 1948 to 1971. From 1935 to 1948, the competition was organized as play-offs between the winners of each of the French regional leagues.

== History ==
The competition was created in 1935, three years after the formation of the professional national championship now known as the Ligue 1. The aim of the tournament was to crown the best amateur football team in France. The champion received a cup from the president of the French Football Federation, Jules Rimet, where the nickname of the competition Challenge Jules‒Rimet came from.

The competition was folded in 1971 in the midst of reform to the football league system in France. The new system after 1971 would bring together professional and amateur leagues in one pyramid. The Division 3 was the successor of the Championnat de France Amateur.

== Format ==
The competition saw several changes in its format in the course of its history. From 1935 to 1948, the Championnat de France Amateur was played at the end of the season between the winners of each regional league. Starting in 1948, an annual league was created, called the Division Nationale, played in the format of four to six geographically-determined groups. The winners of each group at the end of the season would play against each other at the end of the season to determine a winner. The Division Nationale was therefore the highest tier of French amateur football.

Although the professional football pyramid contained two levels, the first and second tiers, the Championnat de France Amateur did note make up the third tier, and there was no system of promotion and relegation between professional and amateur clubs.
