= Antonetti =

Antonetti is a surname derived from the Antonius root name. Notable people with the surname include:

- Chris Antonetti (born 1975), American professional baseball executive
- Frédéric Antonetti (born 1961), French football manager
- Isa Antonetti, American 21st-century musical theater actress
- Leandro Antonetti (born 2003), Puerto Rican footballer
- Lorenzo Antonetti (1922–2013), Italian cardinal of the Catholic Church
- Olga Antonetti (1945–1968), Venezuelan beauty queen

== See also ==
- Antonetta
- Antonietti
