= Antoinette Van Hoesen Wakeman =

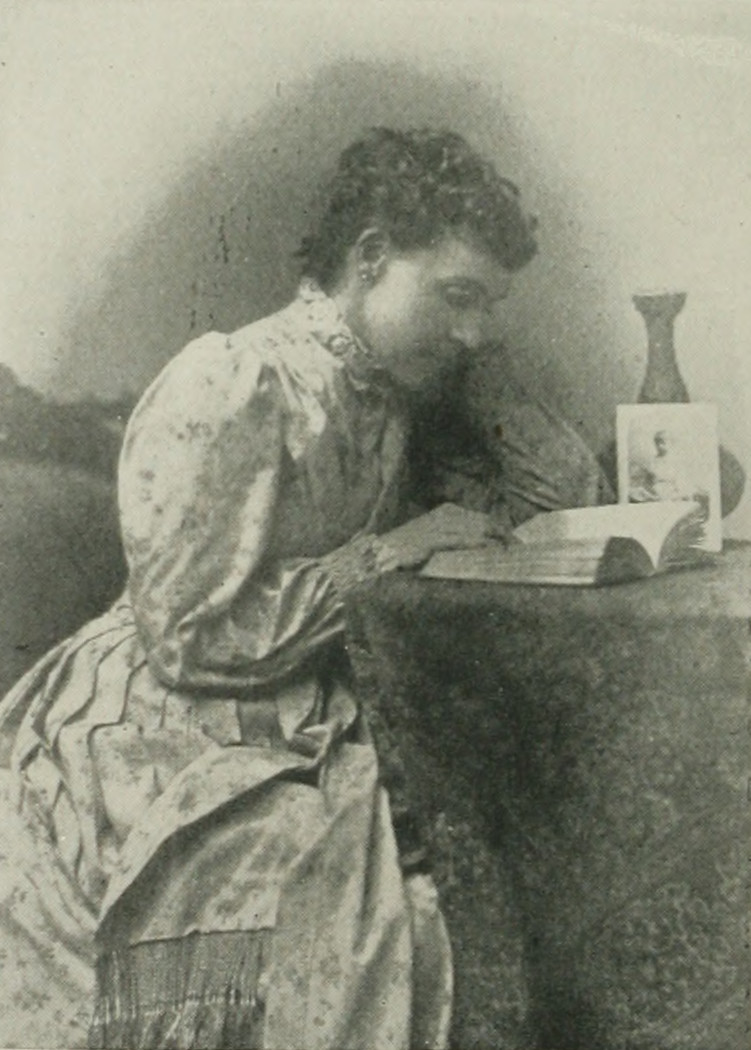
- "A Woman of the Century"
- Born: Antoinette Prudence Van Hoesen; December 15, 1847; Cortland County, New York, US
- Died: December 8, 1921 (aged 73); New York City, US
- Occupation: Journalist
- Spouse: Edgar Lewis Wakeman (m. 1870)

Antoinette Van Hoesen Wakeman (December 15, 1847 – December 8, 1921), publishing also under the pen names Antoinette Van Hoesen and Antoinette Wakeman, was an American journalist who wrote for major Chicago newspapers as well as other periodicals across the country. She also founded periodicals in the fields of industrial education and fashion.

== Family and education ==
She was born Antoinette Prudence Van Hoesen in Cortland County, New York; her parents were John Van Hoesen and Rhoda Berrett. The Van Hoesens were originally a Dutch family; her paternal grandfather Garret Van Hoesen secured a land grant near what is now Hudson from King George III of Great Britain. Her mother died before her first birthday and her father moved the family to Minnesota. Around the age of 10, she was sent to boarding schools in Illinois, first in Evanston and later in Aurora.

In 1870, she married Edgar Lewis Wakeman; they settled in Chicago and had a son, John.

== Career ==
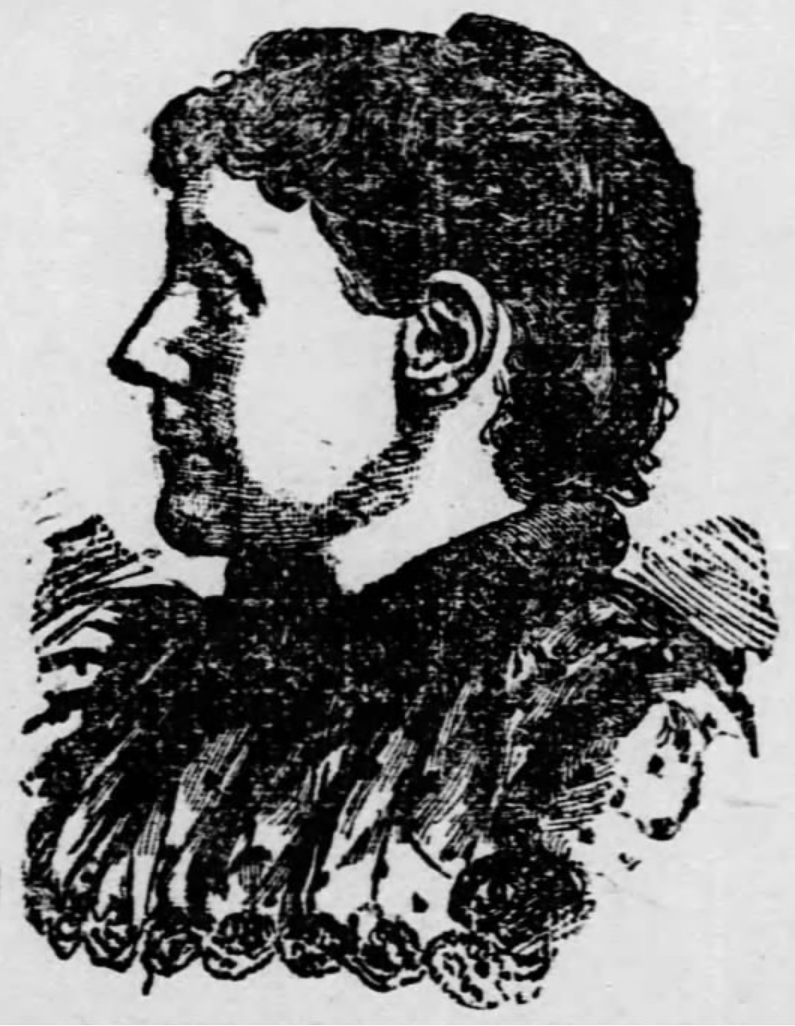
Antoinette Van Hoesen Wakeman

While visiting her brother F. B. Van Hoesen, then a Minnesota State Senator, she met F. A. Carle, editor of the St. Paul Pioneer-Press, who encouraged her to contribute letters to his paper. Later she became a paid contributor to other periodicals across the country, including the Chautauquan, the New York Sun, and House Beautiful.

Wakeman founded the Journal of Industrial Education in the late 1880s, serving as its publisher and editor for several years. She also founded a fashion magazine in New York at the invitation of a company that sold clothing patterns. She found this job uncongenial and resigned, returning to Chicago.

She next joined the staff of the Chicago Evening Journal. When the Chicago Evening Post was established, she joined its staff as both an editor and an art critic, remaining for four years.

Wakeman wrote on a variety of subjects relevant to women readers of her day, ranging from industrial education to dressmaking to women as stock farmers. Although she preferred newspaper work to other kinds of writing, she published poems and a play as well.

Wakeman was a member of the Chicago Woman's Club and one of the founders of the Illinois Women's Press Association.

She was struck by an automobile in New York on November 15, 1921, and died from her injuries at Bellevue Hospital on December 8.

== Books ==
- Scientific Sewing and Garment Cutting (1898; with Louise M. Heller)
- Questions of Conscience: A Novel (1900)
- The Testing: A Play in 4 Acts (1909)
