= Mfilou =

Arrondissement in the Republic of Congo

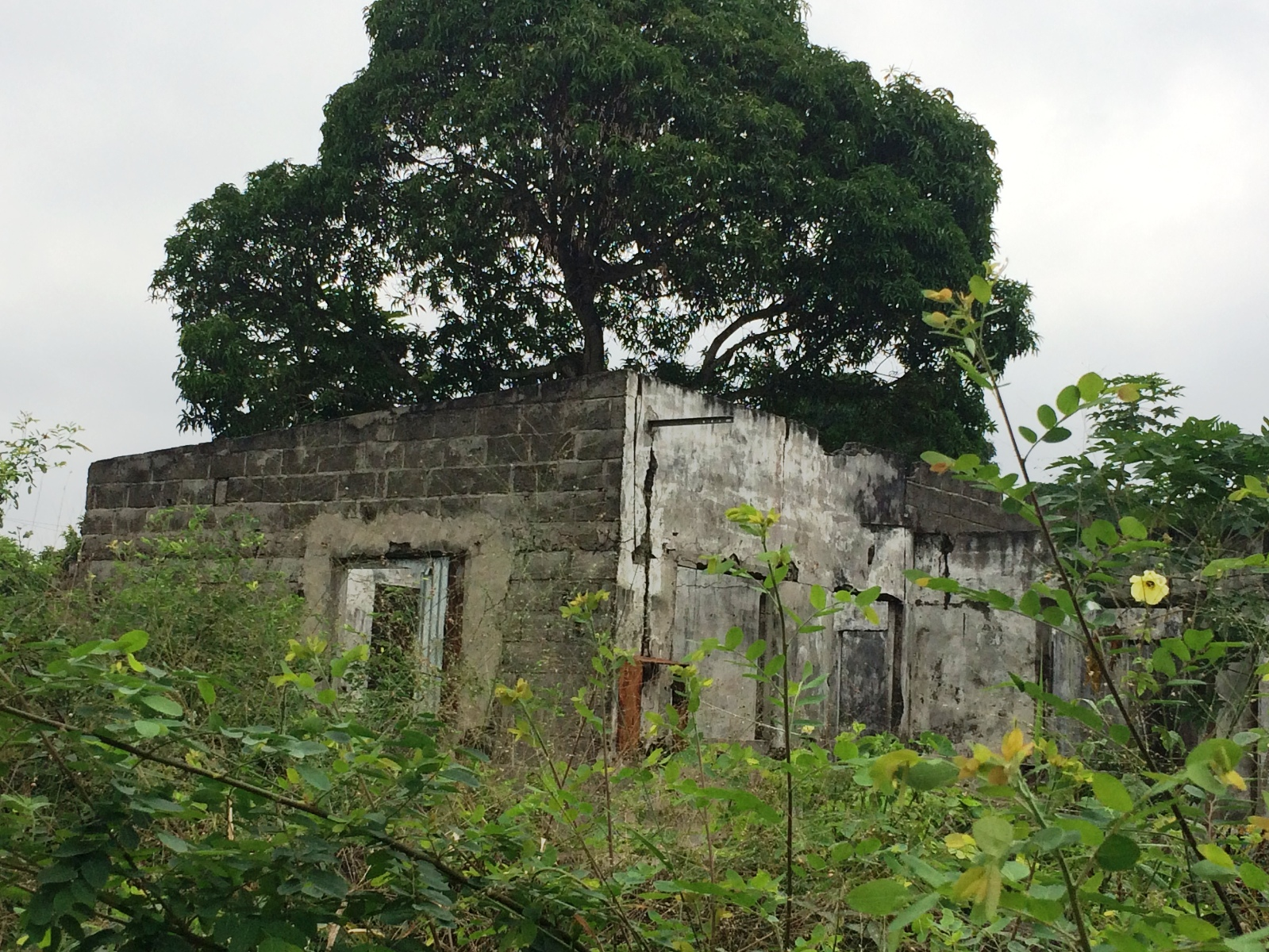
A destroyed house in Mfilou.

Mfilou is the seventh arrondissements of Brazzaville, capital of Republic of Congo.

Before 1984 this area was known as the district of Ngamaba so sometimes it is called as arrondissement 7 Mfilou Ngamaba.

Mfilou Ngamaba is also the name of a kindergarten located in this arrondissement.
