= Bernard Antoinette =

French footballer and manager

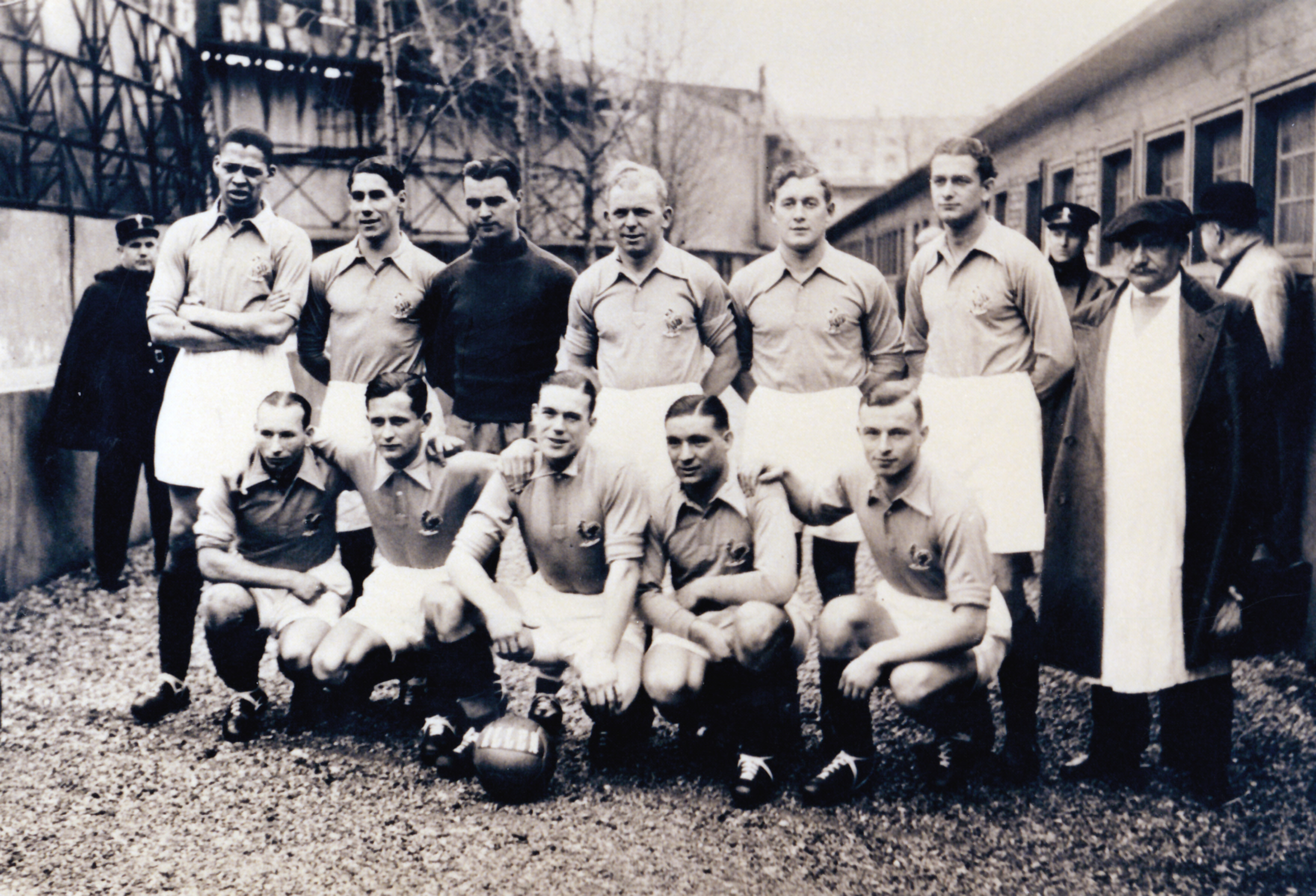
- Antoinette (crouching, first from right) in 1925

Personal information
- Full name: Bernard Pierre Georges Antoinette
- Date of birth: 11 March 1914
- Place of birth: Rouen, Seine-Maritime, France
- Date of death: 4 March 2008 (aged 93)
- Place of death: Bois-Guillaume, Seine-Maritime, France
- Position: Midfielder

Youth career
- 1928–1933: FC Rouen

Senior career*
Years	Team	Apps	(Gls)
1933–1939	FC Rouen		
1939	Red Star		
1941–1943	US Quevilly		
1943–1944	EF Rouen-Normandie		
1944–1945	US Quevilly		

International career
1937	France	1	(0)

Managerial career
- 1948–1966: US Quevilly
- * Club domestic league appearances and goals

Bernard Pierre Georges Antoinette (11 March 1914 – 4 March 2008) was a French footballer who played as a midfielder for FC Rouen and the French national team in the 1930s.

He later worked as a coach, leading US Quevilly to the title of French amateur champion three times (1954, 1955, and 1958).

== Playing career ==
Born in Rouen on 11 March 1914, Antoinette began his football career at the youth ranks of his hometown club FC Rouen in 1928, aged 14, and four years later, in 1932, he won the Young Footballer Competition. He stayed loyal to Rouen for over a decade, from 1928 until 1939, scoring 4 goals in 73 official matches, and helping his side win the 1935–36 French Division 2. In the following year, in 1937, he earned his first two (and only) international caps in friendly matches against Austria at the Parc des Princes on 24 January, and against Belgium in Brussels on 21 February, both of whom ended in losses.

In 1939, he joined Red Star, but his career there was cut short by the outbreak of the Second World War, during which he was appointed player-coach of US Quevilly 1941, played for EF Rouen-Normandie in the 1943–44 French Federal Football Championship, and then retired at Quevilly in 1945, aged 31.

== Manegerial career ==
After his career as a player ended, Antoinette remained linked to Quevilly, now as a coach, which he oversaw for 18 years, from 1948 to 1966, leading them to the title of French amateur champion three times (1954, 1955, and 1958). He then became a regional technical advisor in the Normandy Football League from 1967 to 1972.

On 8 February 1971, he gave a speech about the club's results that year.

== Death and legacy ==
Antoinette died in Bois-Guillaume on 4 March 2008, at the age of 93. Quevilly's stadium was renamed after him.

== Works ==
- Dictionnaire du Moyen Âge: histoire et société
- Le grand atlas des explorations (Paris, 1993)
- Le Monde au présent
- Payscope: le nouveau paysage mondial

== Honours ==
=== As a player ===
FC Rouen

- Ligue 2:
  - Champions (1): 1935–36

=== As a coach ===
US Quevilly

- French amateur champion:
  - Champions (3): 1954, 1955, and 1958

== See also ==
List of longest managerial reigns in association football

== Bibliography ==
- Boëda, Jean-Marc (2012). Petit-Quevilly dans la cour des Grands, 2002-2012 [Petit-Quevilly in the big leagues, 2002-2012] (in French). Paris: Envie De Normandie EDN éditions. p. 224. ISBN 978-2954241104.
