= Antoinette Borg =

Maltese basketball player

Personal information
- Born: 22 October 1988 (age 38) Pietà, Malta
- Listed height: 1.82 m (6 ft 0 in)
- Position: Small forward

Career history
- 2005: Depiro
- 2005-2006: Virtus Siracusa
- 2006-2007: Libertas Trogylos
- 2007-2008: Rescifina Messina
- 2010-2012: Depiro
- 2012-2013: Hibernians
- 2013-2014: Depiro
- 2014-present: Honey Athleta

Antoinette Borg (born 22 October 1988) is a Maltese female professional basketball player.
