= Elachista antonia =

Scientific classification
- Kingdom: Animalia
- Phylum: Arthropoda
- Class: Insecta
- Order: Lepidoptera
- Family: Elachistidae
- Genus: Elachista
- Species: E. antonia

Binomial name
- Elachista antonia Kaila, 2007

Species of moth

Elachista antonia is a moth of the family Elachistidae. It is found on Crete.

The length of the forewings is 2.8–3.8 mm.
