= Antoinette Béfort =

French painter (1788–1868)

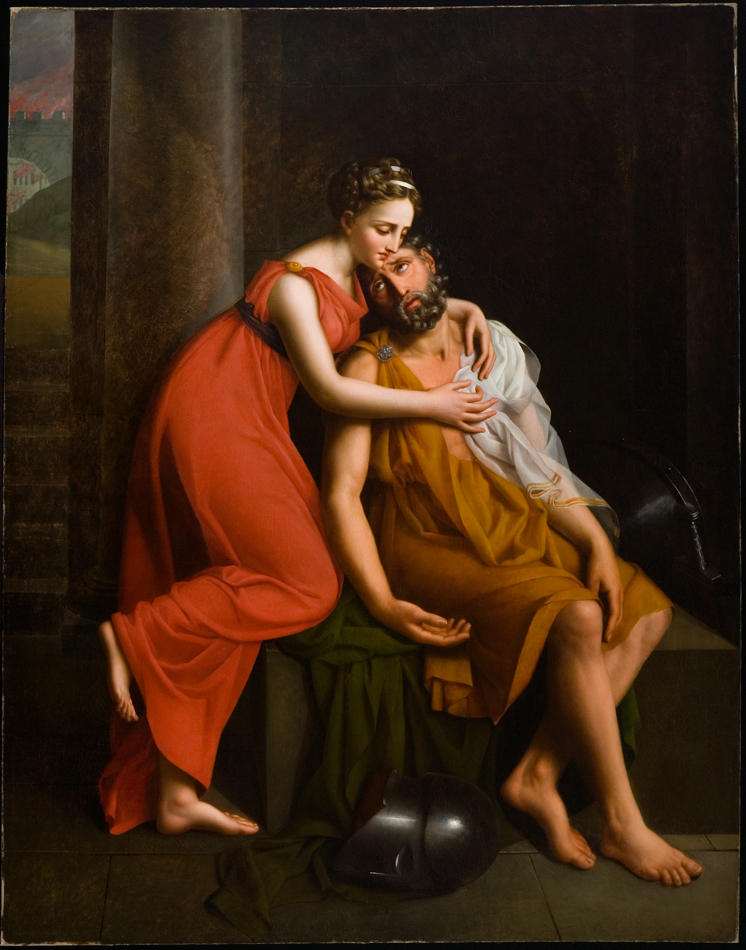
A Young Woman from Thebes Tending Her Wounded Father

Antoinette Béfort (1788–1868) was a French history painter active in Paris during the late Napoleonic period and the Bourbon Restoration. She exhibited regularly at the Paris Salon between 1810 and 1819, where she received a second-class medal in 1810. Her work consisted primarily of mythological and classical subjects from antiquity and epic poetry.

== Biography ==
Antoinette Élisabeth Jeanne Bandelier de Béfort was born in Paris on 8 August 1788, in the parish of Sainte-Marie-Madeleine de la Ville-l’Évêque. She was the daughter of Antoine-Pierre Bandelier, a merchant, and Marie-Louise-Élisabeth Gauvain, who lived near the Place Louis-le-Grand (today the Place Vendôme). Belonging to a commercial milieu that could support her artistic ambitions, Béfort enrolled in the studios of Gioacchino Serangeli and Césarine Davin-Mirvault, themselves both followers of David.

Béfort exhibited at the Paris Salon between 1810 and 1819. A portrait of her by Julie Volpelière, a fellow student of Serangeli, was exhibited at the 1814 Salon. In addition to her work as a history painter, Béfort practiced art restoration, which provided a supplementary income for many women artists of her generation. In 1824, she was recorded as having restored and varnished a painting by Perugino.

On 3 June 1841, Béfort married Pierre Pascal Ledru, at the time captain-adjutant major of the 18th Line Infantry Regiment.

She was active in the Paris art world throughout the Restoration and died in Lyon on 17 October 1868, at the age of 80.

== Salon Exhibitions ==
1810

- Une jeune Thébaine pansant son père blessé (Second-class medal)

1812

- Thésée et Ariane

1814

- Une jeune Thébaine pansant son père blessé
- Thésée allant combattre le Minotaure reçoit le peloton de fil des mains d’Ariane
- Eurydice, fuyant les poursuites d’Aristée, est piquée par un serpent
- Les adieux d’Hector et d’Andromaque

1817

- Les adieux d’Hector et d’Andromaque
- Portrait d’homme

1819

- Céphale et Procris
- Portrait du père de l’auteur
