= Jean Quarré =

French printer and communist activist

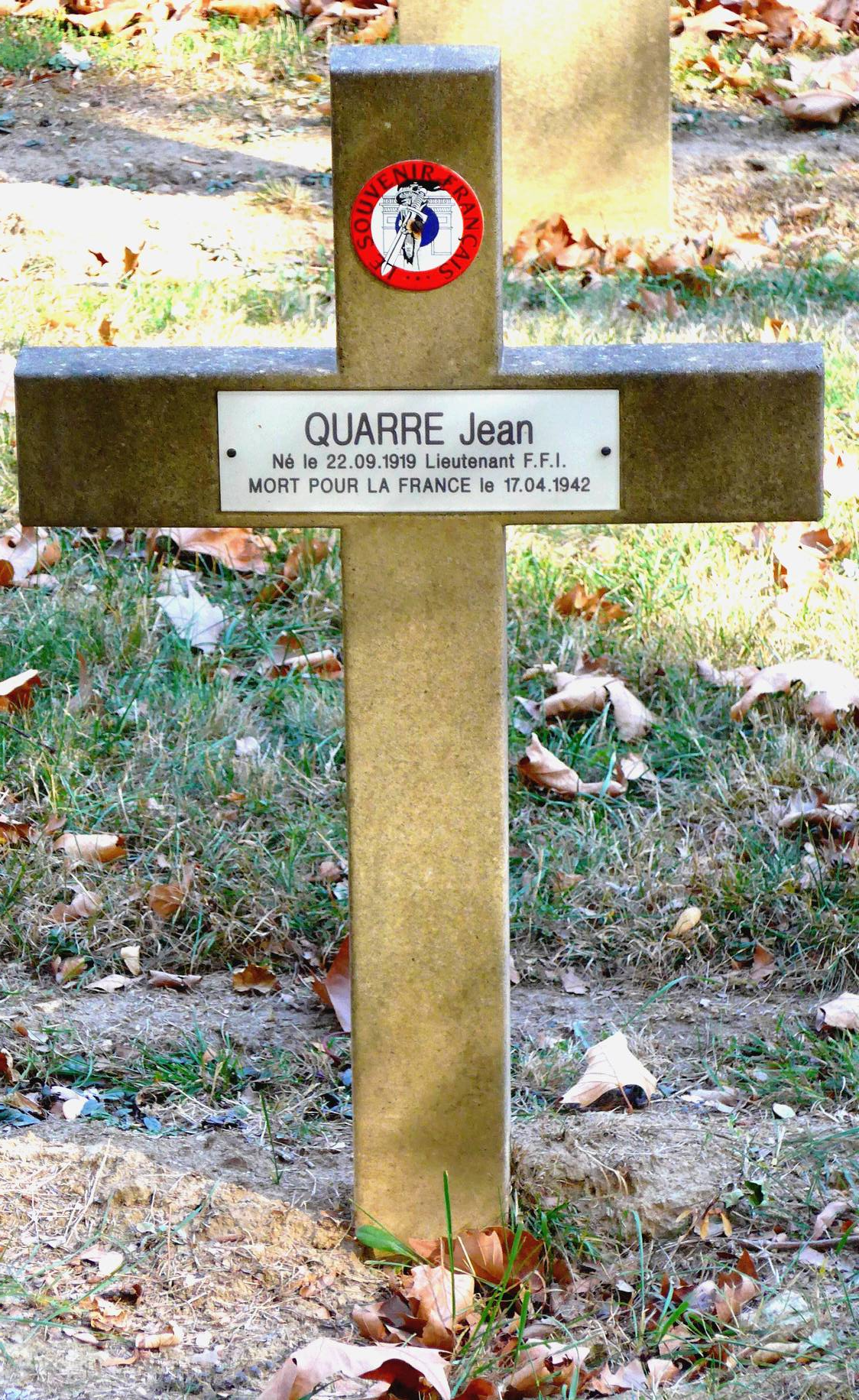
The grave of Jean Quarré, in the Parisian Cemetery of Ivry

Jean Quarré (1919–1942) was a French printer and communist activist. He was born in Paris, France, on September 22, 1919, and was executed on April 17, 1942. He was a member of Les Bataillons de la Jeunesse.

He was arrested February 27, 1942 and was killed by firing squad in 1942 in Paris.

A street is named after him in Paris. A refugee centre was also opened up in his name in Paris.
