= Antonette Wilken =

Zimbabwean diver (born 1961)

Personal information
- Nationality: Zimbabwean
- Born: 9 June 1961 (age 64); Harare, Rhodesia

Sport
- Sport: Diving

Antonette Wilken (born 9 June 1961) is a Zimbabwean diver. She competed at the 1980 Summer Olympics and the 1984 Summer Olympics.
