= Maria Antonio of Vicenza =

Antonio of Vicenza (1 March 1834 – 22 June 1884) born in Vicenza, died in Rovigno, was a Reformed Minorite.

After his ordination in 1856, he devoted himself to the study of scholastic authors, especially of St. Bonaventure whose Breviloquium he published in a new edition (Venice, 1874; Freiburg, 1881). He also edited the Lexicon Bonaventurianum, (Venice, 1880), in which the terminology of the scholastics is explained. His contributions to hagiography include nineteen studies of the lives of the saints of the Franciscan Order.
