= Antoinette Tordesillas =

Applied mathematician

Antoinette A. Tordesillas is an Australian mathematician. She is a professor of applied mathematics at the University of Melbourne, Australia who has helped build a foundational understanding of the dynamics of granular materials. She received the J H Michell Medal in 2000 and her major contributions include research predicting the response of extraterrestrial soil to attempts to build, mine, or drill and a model that can identify the location and time of future landslides or earthquakes by analyzing slope stability changes.

== Education and career ==
Tordesillas attended the University of Adelaide where she majored in applied mathematics and physical and inorganic chemistry and earned a B.S. in 1986. Her honours thesis in applied mathematics involved the development of a model of the hot-dip galvanising process for creating sheet metal. She earned her Ph.D. in solid mechanics in 1992 from the University of Wollongong with a dissertation involving the contact mechanics of roller coating supervised by James Murray Hill. After temporary positions at the University of Colorado at Boulder and Kansas State University, she joined the University of Melbourne department of mathematics and statistics in 1996. She took on a joint position in geomechanics there in 2013 and was promoted to full professor in 2016.

At the University of Melbourne, Tordesillas teaches as the senior mathematics and statistics lecturer, heads the Micromechanics of Granular Media Group, and conducts research across the fields of mathematics, engineering, physics, and geophysics. This research has involved international collaborations, multidisciplinary teams, and large-scale projects funded by various international agencies including NASA, the Hong Kong Research Council, the US National Science Foundation, and the US Department of Defense. Much of her research centers around understanding the dynamics of granular materials and applications of this pursuit including predicting seismic activity and preparing for future space travel.

== Research ==
=== Understanding martian and lunar soil ===
Tordesillas, in collaboration with NASA, led a team studying the soil of Mars and the moon with the aim of understanding how their surfaces would respond to attempts to build, mine, or drill. NASA approached Tordesillas at the recommendation of the US Army, who named her as the authority to consult about sand. To tackle the project, Tordesillas and her team at the University of Melbourne used data about extraterrestrial soil and photos collected by orbiters and rovers in conjunction with a study of granule dynamics. This approach involved testing simulated space soil, computer modeling the effects of added pressure, and considering simpler models of highly idealized particles adjusted for differences in the strength of gravity. Tordesillas contemplated highly idealized particles that were round and uniform while questioning how the unique shapes observed on Mars and the moon formed. She recognized that many different local conditions would need to be understood prior to any future landings. She also noted the potential application of this research to combat problems arising from the unpredictable nature of stored granular materials.These materials include the products of important Australian export industries such as wheat, iron ore, and coal.

=== Predicting seismic activity ===
Tordesillas received a $750,000 grant from the Australian research fund and the US Army Research Office to develop a model that generates a high-resolution picture of individual granules and allows the visualization of the shear-band microstructures that precede disruptions in granular materials. This represents an important step towards predicting earthquakes and mitigating soil erosion from heavy off-road military vehicles. Tordesillas and her team developed a software tool using applied mathematics and big data analytics to predict the time and location of landslides up to two weeks in advance. This model analyzes large quantities of data to identify sites of future failures, or sites of seismic activity. It flags locations where patterns of motion become ordered because, preceding seismic activity, particles begin moving in similar ways approaching the site of what will become a failure. It uses the expanding capabilities of computer programming and memory to decode big data and convert it into a network conducive to the recognition of hidden patterns. The early detection of subtle changes is key to predicting failures and allows existing data to inform risk assessment and management. This effort culminated after five years of work when Tordesillas and Robin Batterham developed, tested, and patented the Spatiotemporal Slope Stability Analytics for Failure Estimate (SSAFE) model. This model analyzes slope stability data over time to predict the time and location of future failures, combining remote seismic data with the physics of granular failure. The model can be used to predict failures in mines where precise measurements concerning the movement along rock faces. It can also monitor rural areas where satellites collect radar data every few days or weeks, but its ultimate goal is improving early warning systems and mitigating the dangers of landslides in the context of climate change.

=== Comminution and the removal of liquid from a material ===
On July 13, 2012, Tordesillas filed a patent application with Peter Joseph Scales, Anthony Dirk Stickland, Robin John Battheram, and the University of Melbourne for the comminution and/or removal of liquid from a material. The World Intellectual Property Organization published that this patent covers a material processing method developed by the four scientists in which a material is fed between oppositely moving surfaces with the result of shearing the material parallel to its direction of flow between the two surfaces.

== Awards ==
Tordesillas was awarded the J H Michell Medal in 2000 by the Australian and New Zealand Industrial and Applied Mathematics Society. This is an annual award for an outstanding new researcher in applied mathematics.

== Publications ==
According to the University of Melbourne website, as of April 2023 Tordesillas has published 167 scholarly articles with publication dates ranging from 1989 to 2023.
