= Antionette Carroll =

American activist and entrepreneur

Antionette D. Carroll is an activist and entrepreneur working for racial and health equity. She looks at systems of oppression from a design perspective. In Carroll’s mind, the same way a machine can be redesigned so can these social systems.

== Early life ==
She was raised in a primarily black, low-income area of St. Louis, Missouri. Her home was very encouraging of pursuing the arts and she found her creativity seep into many of her childhood activities. She began her education studying biology and it wasn't until her sophomore year of college that she discovered design and marketing was where she wanted to move her focus.

== Career ==
Carroll has worked for many nonprofit companies as well as dedicated 10 years of her time to volunteer work. This work has earned her many recognitions and awards including being named the Founding Chair of the Diversity and Inclusion Task Force of AIGA. During her tenure, she founded and launched several initiatives, including the Design Census Program with Google, Racial Justice by Design Initiative, Diversity and Inclusion Residency, and national Design for Inclusivity Summit with Microsoft. Along with this work she is also an international speaker and facilitator, previously speaking at Google, TED, Capital One, Harvard, Stanford University, Microsoft, NASA.

== Creative Reaction Lab ==
Carroll is the founder of the nonprofit Creative Reaction Lab, which she established following the 2014 Ferguson uprisings. Her work focuses on promoting racial and health equity by engaging individuals of all ages in community redesign and social justice initiatives.

Carroll is currently the Founder, President and CEO of Creative Reaction Lab. This is a nonprofit which educates youth, specifically black and Latino youth, to challenge oppressive systems. The creative reaction Lab is located in St. Louis, MO. The project aims to challenge the idea that only adults with big corporate titles have the power to make change. A major component of these programs is that they are intergenerational. This allows for an environment where traditional power dynamics to be challenged. The youth members receive a set of tools to break down oppressive systems that they would not receive elsewhere. One of the current programs of the Creative Reaction Lab is the Community Design Apprenticeship Program. This program aims to educate and train formerly incarcerated and justice system-impacted Black and Latinx youth to become civic leaders in their communities. By educating tomorrow's leaders Antionette Carroll hopes to get ahead of the next generation's social injustices.
