= Antoinette Najeeb =

Syrian actress (1930–2022)

Antoinette Najib
- أنطوانيت نجيب
- Born: February 20, 1930; Daraa, Syria
- Died: August 17, 2022 (aged 92); Damascus, Syria
- Notable work: Khatoon, Cherry Messages, Sharie' Chicago

Antoinette Najeeb (Arabic: أنطوانيت نجيب, February 20, 1930 – August 17, 2022) was a Syrian actress.

== Biography ==
Najeeb was born in Daraa, Syria in 1930.

In 1968, her career began when she joined the Actors Syndicate, Syria. She was previously married to actor Youssef Choueiri.

== Filmography ==
- Naked Without Sin (1967)
- Sah El Nom (1972)
- Apartment of Love (1973)
- A Confused Woman (1973)
- Mirrors (2000)
- The Four Seasons
- Wiladah Min Al Khasira
- Jasmine collar
- Prohibited Love
- Little Hearts
- Men Wanted
- Al-Shared
