= Antoinette Duclaire =

Haitian feminist and political activist (1987–2021)

- Born: 31 October 1987; Chantal, Haiti
- Died: 30 June 2021 (aged 33); Port-au-Prince, Haiti
- Occupation: Activist

Antoinette Duclaire (31 October 1987 – 30 June 2021) was a Haitian feminist and political activist.

== Biography ==
Born in 1987, Duclaire studied classical studies with the Immaculate Sisters of Sainte-Jeanne de Chantal and at Collège Saint-Jean des Cayes. She then studied anthropology and sociology at the Université d'État d'Haïti. After graduation, she collaborated with Radio Télé Pacific and worked as a radio show host for Radio Sans Frontière. She co-founded La Repiblik Magazine and was a member of Rasanbleman pou Diyite Ayiti.

=== Assassination ===
On the night of 29 June 2021, Duclaire and journalist Diego Charles were shot in Port-au-Prince in a vehicle which was driven by Duclaire. She was hit by seven bullets and was pronounced dead in the early hours of 30 June. 13 others were killed that day in Delmas. A requiem mass in honor of Duclaire and Charles took place on 17 July, and a celebration of her life sponsored by Solidarité des Femmes Haïtiennes Journalistes occurred the following day in Port-au-Prince. The final tribute to Duclaire took place on 19 July and was put on by "Zèklè Gwoup Fanm nan Sid".
