= Uwamahoro Antoinette =

Rwandan actress (born 1975)

- Born: 25 December 1975 (age 50); Kigali
- Other names: Intare y'igore Siperansiya
- Occupation: Actress
- Children: 8

Uwamahoro Antoinette (born 25 December 1975 in Kigali) is a Rwandan actress.

== Career ==
Uwamahoro Antoinette as known as "Intare y'igore","Siperansiya" has been acting in films for twenty years in Rwanda. She became famous in various Rwandan movies including Serwakira, Giramata, Mukadata, Intare y'ingore and others. In other level will be very popular in Seburikoko on Rwandan Television.

== Influencer ==
She felt to become a movie star like command.

== Personal life ==
She is the eldest of seven children.

She is married and has three children. Currently, she lives in Nyarugenge District in Nyamirambo Sector.
