= Antoinette Quarré =

French poet (1813–1847)

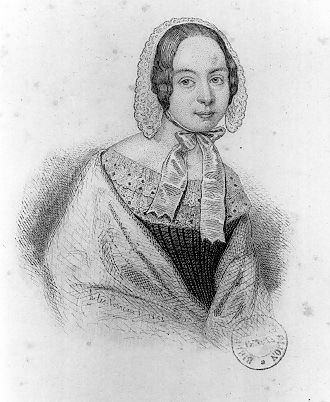
- Quarré ca. 1840
- Born: Antoinette Célinie Quarré; January 16, 1813; Recey-sur-Ource, France
- Died: November 25, 1847 (aged 34); Dijon, France
- Resting place: Péjoces Cemetery
- Occupation: poet

Antoinette Quarré (January 16, 1813 – November 25, 1847) was a French poet.

== Biography ==
Antoinette Célinie Quarré was born on January 16, 1813, in Recey-sur-Ource, France. Her parents were Cécile Quarré and an unknown father.

Though of fragile health, she worked as a laundress in Dijon. Legend has it that she learned to read from Voltaire's Zaire. Educated by a scholar, M. de Belloguet, she turned to poetry and published several essays in verse and prose (notably in the Journal des Demoiselles), as well as a eulogy for Princess Marie d’Orléans, which earned her, in 1839, a mention from the Société des lettres et des arts de Seine-et-Oise. She sent her verses to Alphonse de Lamartine, whom she admired. He replied to her on August 24, 1838, with a poem titled "À une jeune fille poète " (To a Young Poetess), which he later included in his "Recueillements poétiques" (Poetic Reflections). Quarré responded to this poem with another poem, "Réponse à M. de Lamartine" (Reply to Mr. de Lamartine). Quarré's friends encouraged her to publish her first collection, which appeared in 1843 and attracted considerable attention.

== Death and legacy ==
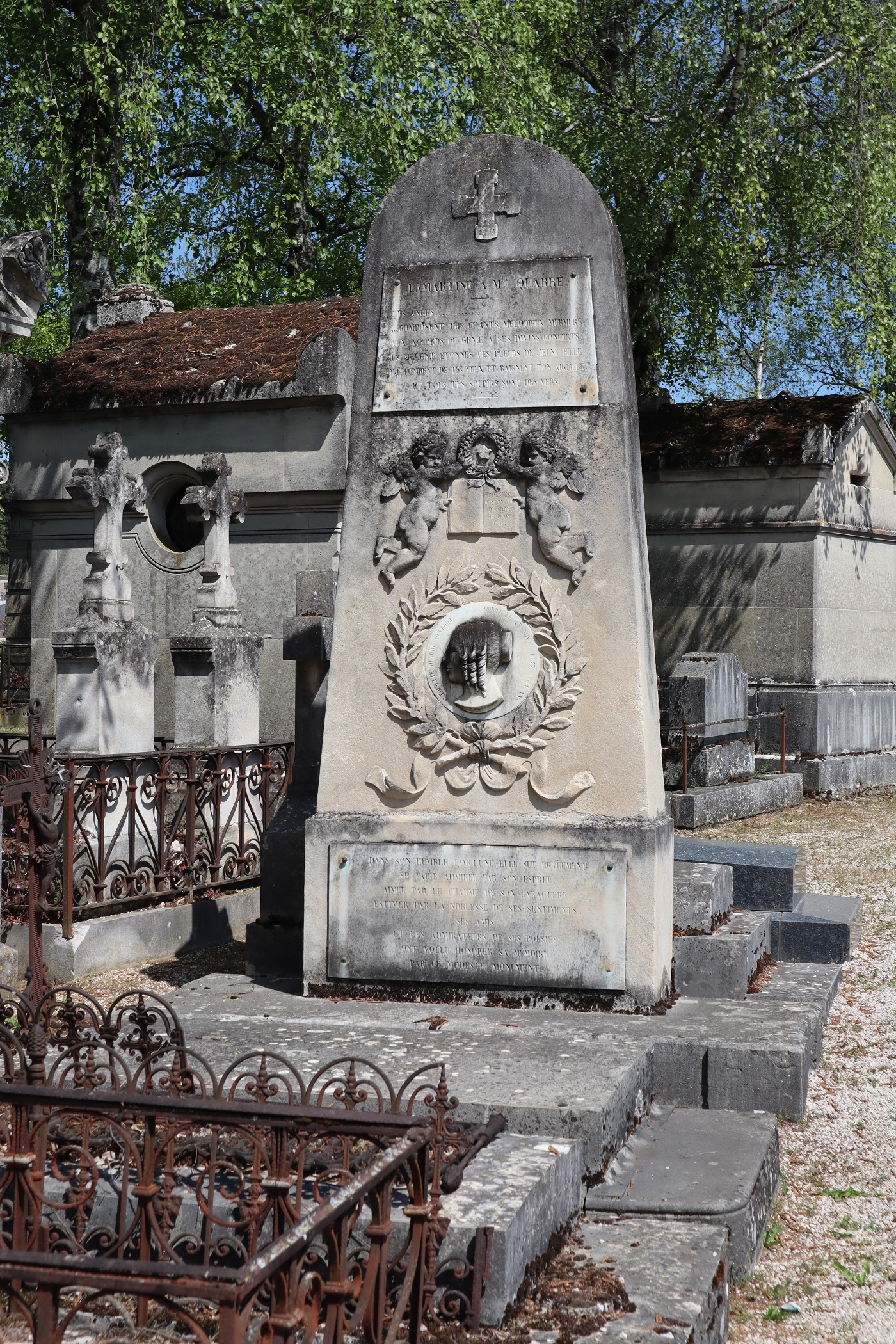
Quarré's tomb

Of frail constitution, she died (of heart enlargement) on November 25, 1847, in Dijon. She is buried in the Péjoces Cemetery.

In her portrait of Antoinette Quarré in Tour de France, Flora Tristan comes across as openly hostile toward Quarré. (Note: Flora Tristan notably criticizes Antoinette Quarré here for her physical ugliness, which, in her view, necessarily reflects a similar inner ugliness. Since Flora Tristan presents herself, by contrast, as a moral—and thus also physical—model, one might wonder whether this is not simply an expression of jealousy, perhaps stemming from the poetic exchanges between Antoinette Quarré and Lamartine.)

Xavier Privas, a Lyon-based and later Paris-based goguettier, lists Quarré among the famous goguettières alongside Élisa Fleury and Élie Deleschaux of Paris, Reine Garde of Aix-en-Provence, and Rose Harel of Lisieux.

== Selected works ==
- À Hégésippe Moreau, an elegy submitted to the Académie des Jeux Floraux competition, 1840
- Poésies d'Antoinette Quarré, Dijon, 1843
