= Antonia =

Antonia may refer to:

== People ==
- Antonia (name), including a list of people with the name
- Antonia gens, a Roman family, any woman of the gens was named Antonia
- Antônia (footballer) (born 1994)
- Antônia Melo (born 1949)
- Antonia Iacobescu, also known simply as Antonia (born 1989), Romanian singer
- Antonia (Italian singer) (born 2005)

== Entertainment ==
- Antonia's Line, originally Antonia, a 1995 Dutch drama
- Antonia (1935 film), a French musical comedy film
- Antônia (film), a 2006 Brazilian musical drama
- Antonia: A Portrait of the Woman, a 1974 documentary
- Antonia, a Mad TV recurring character
- "Antonia", a song by Motion City Soundtrack on the album Even If It Kills Me
- "Antonia", a song by Pat Metheny on the album Secret Story
- "Antonia", a love interest of James T. Kirk in Star Trek Generations
- Antonia, an 1863 novel by George Sand
- Antonia (2022 film), a Peruvian drama film
- Antonia (TV series), a 2024 Italian television series

== Places ==
- Antonia, Masovian Voivodeship, east-central Poland
- Antonia, Warmian-Masurian Voivodeship, north Poland
- Antonia, Missouri, a community in the United States
- Antonia Fortress, Jerusalem
- Pico de Antónia, Cape Verde
- Antonia (Port Allen, Louisiana), a historic plantation

== Biology ==
- Antonia (plant), a genus in the Loganiaceae family
- Antonia (fly), a genus of flies in the family Bombyliidae
- Antopedaliodes antonia, a butterfly species in the genus Antopedaliodes and the tribe Satyrini
- Elachista antonia, a moth species in the genus Elachista

== Other uses ==
- RMS Antonia, a 1921 ocean liner
- 272 Antonia, an asteroid
- British Rail Class 40 diesel locomotive D214, built by English Electric at Newton-le-Willows, Lancashire

== See also ==
- Antonya Nelson
- My Ántonia, a 1918 novel by Willa Cather
