= Marie Antoinette (disambiguation) =

Marie Antoinette (1755–1793) was an Archduchess of Austria and the Queen of France and Navarre.

Marie Antoinette may also refer to:

== Arts and entertainment ==
- Marie Antoinette (TV series), a 2022 drama series for Canal+, BBC and PBS
- Marie Antoinette, the Love of a King, a 1922 German film directed by Rudolf Meinert
- Marie Antoinette: The Portrait of an Average Woman, a 1932 biography by Stefan Zweig
  - Marie Antoinette (1938 film), a film starring Norma Shearer based on the Zweig book
- Marie Antoinette: The Journey, a 2001 biography by Antonia Fraser
  - Marie Antoinette (2006 film), a film by Sofia Coppola based on the Fraser book
    - Marie Antoinette (soundtrack)
- Marie Antoinette (musical), a 2006 musical theater production by Michael Kunze and Sylvester Levay
- Marie Antoinette with a Rose, an oil painting by Élisabeth Vigée Le Brun
- Marie Antoinette, a play by Paolo Giacometti
- “Marie Antoinette”, a song by Curved Air from the album Phantasmagoria
- Marie Antoinette (Lady Oscar), a character in The Rose of Versailles series

== Other uses ==
- Marie Antoinette (given name), a list of people
- Marie Antoinette (watch), a watch designed by Swiss watchmaker Abraham-Louis Breguet in 1802

== See also ==
- Maria Antonia (disambiguation)
- María Antonieta
- María Antonietta
