= Denis Sassou Nguesso University =

Public university in Congo Brazzaville

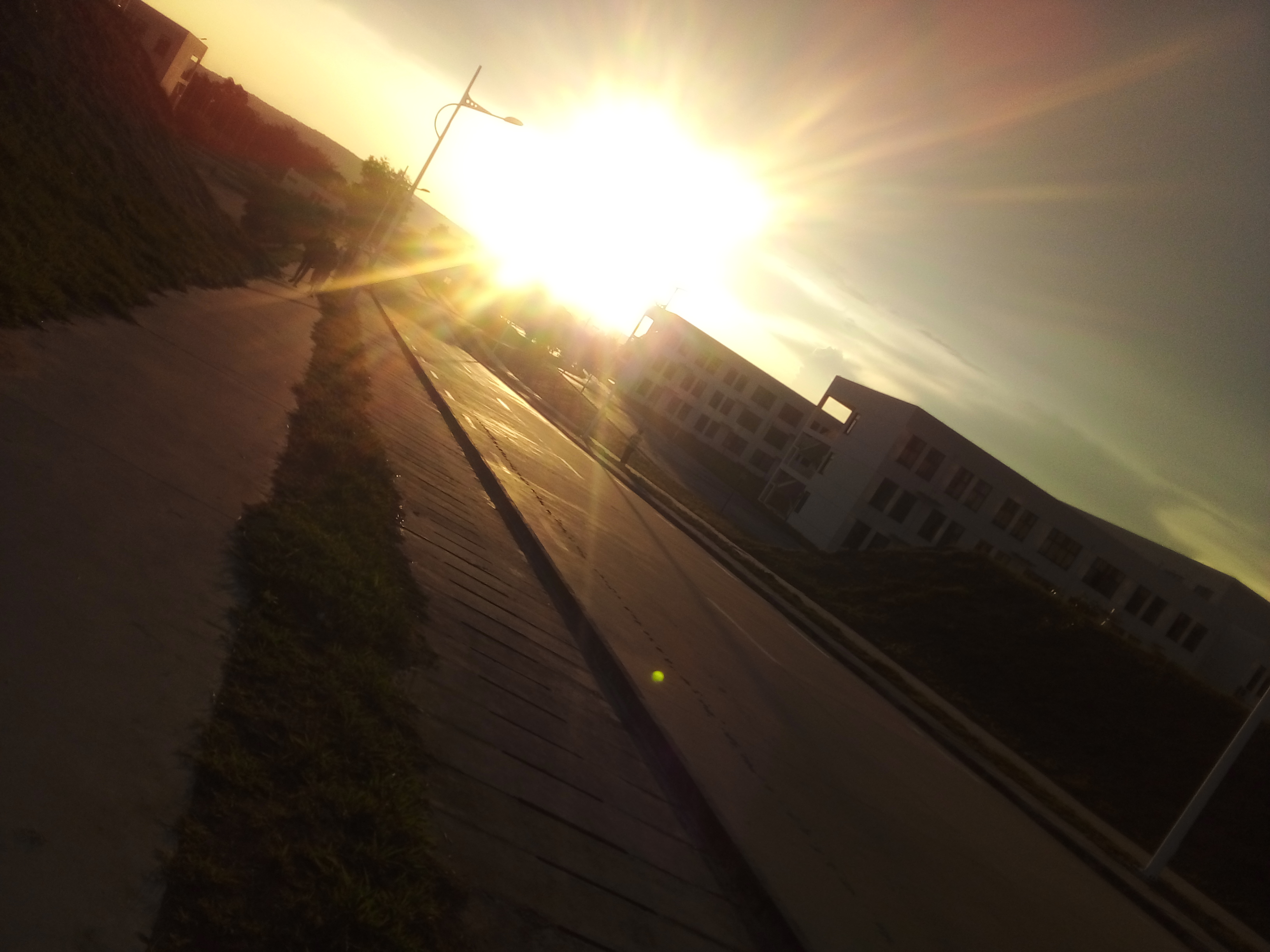
- Motto: Rigueur - Excellence - Lumières
- Type: Public university
- Established: February 5, 2021
- President: Professor Ange Antoine Abena
- Students: 30,000
- Location: Brazzaville, Republic of the Congo; 4.137°S 15.357°E
- Language: French
- Website: www.udsn.cg

Denis Sassou Nguesso University (UDSN) is a Pan-African university established in the Republic of the Congo and inaugurated on February 5, 2021 in Kintélé. It aims to be a structure for scientific, technological, and development research with an international character.

== Location ==
Situated in the urban commune of Kintélé in the Pool Department, Denis Sassou Nguesso University is built on a 350-hectare site adorned with 4.5 kilometers of paved roads providing access to the various completed buildings.

== History ==
Inaugurated on February 5, 2021 by President Denis Sassou-Nguesso in the presence of his Senegalese counterpart Macky Sall, Nigerien counterpart Mahamadou Issoufou, and Bissau-Guinean counterpart Umaro Sissoco Embaló, who had traveled to Brazzaville for the occasion, this university became the second public university in the Republic of the Congo.

== Institutions ==
Denis Sassou Nguesso University currently has three functional institutions:

- Higher Institute of Geographical, Environmental and Planning Sciences (ISSGEA)
- Higher Institute of Architecture, Urban Planning, Buildings, and Public Works (ISAUBTP)
- Faculty of Applied Sciences (FSA)

== See also ==
=== Related articles ===
- Marien Ngouabi University
- École supérieure de gestion et d'administration des entreprises (ESGAE)

=== External links ===
- Official website
