= Maria Antonietta Picconi =

Italian composer and pianist

Maria Antonietta Picconi (born 23 September 1869, d. 1926) was an Italian composer and pianist born in Rome, Italy. She studied piano at the St. Cecilia Conservatory in Rome with Giovanni Sgambati and composition with Eugenio Terziani. She performed as a concert pianist from 1886 to 1896, and then worked as a piano and voice teacher. She died in Rome in 1926.

== Works ==
Picconi was known for drawing-room songs. Selected works include:

- Donna vorrei morir, romance for baritone and mezzo-soprano
- Fiorellin di siepe, melody
- Un Organetto from Sei Melodie per canto e pianoforte
