= Tionette Stoddard =

New Zealand skeleton racer

Tionette Stoddard aka T-Dog (born 24 September 1974) is a New Zealand skeleton racer who has competed since 2004. Her best Skeleton World Cup finish was seventh at St. Moritz in January 2008.

Stoddard's best finish at the FIBT World Championships was 12th in the women's event at Lake Placid in 2009.

She qualified for the 2010 Winter Olympics where she finished 14th.
