= Lékoumou Department =

Department of the Republic of the Congo

Coordinates: 0.866667°S 14.8167°E

Lékoumou
- Department
- Lékoumou, department of the Republic of the Congo
- Country: Republic of the Congo
- Capital: Sibiti

Area
  - Total: 20,950 km^{2} (8,090 sq mi)

Population (2023 census)
  - Total: 100,559
  - Density: 4.800/km^{2} (12.43/sq mi)
- HDI (2021): 0.465 low · 10th of 12

Lékoumou (can also be written as Lekumu) is a department of the Republic of the Congo in the southern part of the country. It borders the departments of Bouenza, Niari, Plateaux, Pool, and the nation of Gabon. The regional capital is Sibiti. Principal cities and towns include Komono and Zanaga.

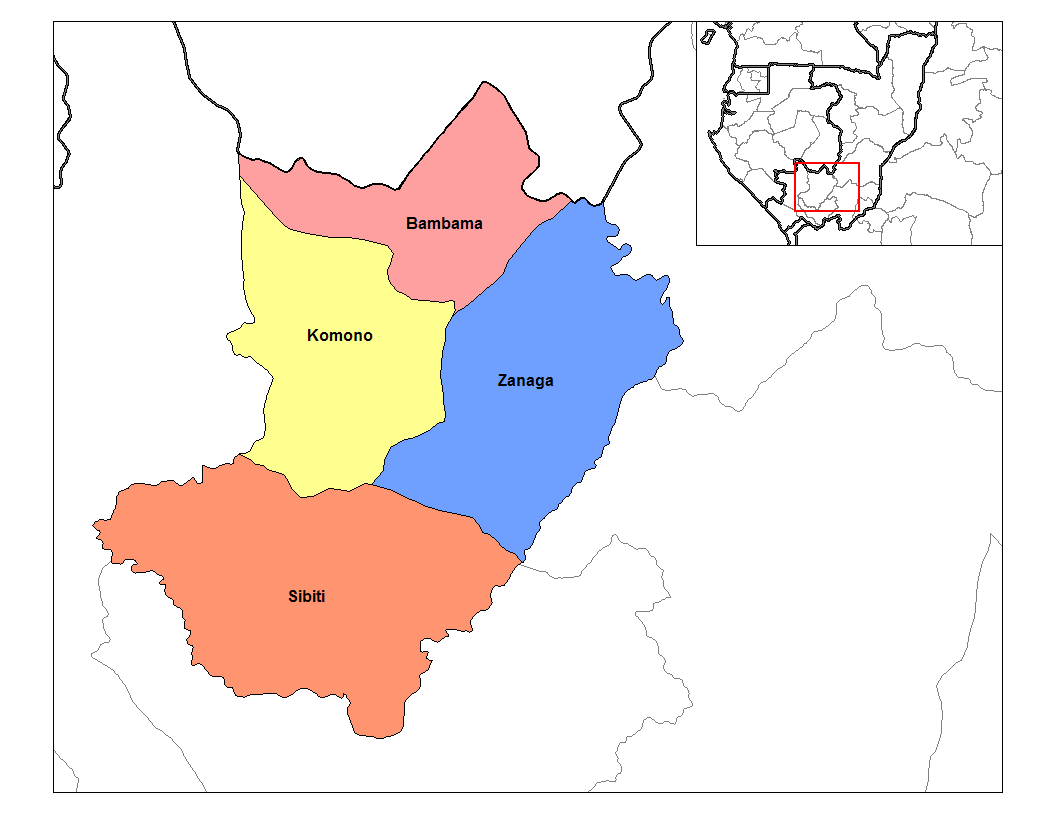
Districts of Lékoumou

== Administrative divisions ==
Lékoumou Department is divided into five districts:

=== Districts ===
1. Sibiti District
2. Komono District
3. Zanaga District
4. Bambama District
5. Mayéyé District

== Economy ==
Subsistence farming, carried out by small producers (cassava, peanuts, tarots, plantain, squash, sorrel, ginger, artisanal palm oil), and arboriculture (safoutiers, mango trees, bananas) are the main agricultural activities. The timber industry is an important activity. The Lékoumou contains iron deposits, the most important of which is that of Zanaga. Its exploitation by a partnership between the South African Zanaga Iron Ore Company and the Swiss group Glencore Xstrata, is subject to the rise in world iron prices.

The region offers tourist wealth oriented towards the discovery of the country, the forest, the villages and their products. A liana bridge, located towards Bambama, near the village of Simonbondo, on the Gabonese border, is famous for the choice of natural materials and their assembly, making it possible to cross 74 m. without intermediate support
