= Antonin (name) =

- Gender: Male

Origin
- Word/name: Antonius

Antonin, Antonín, and Antoñín are masculine given names. Antonín, a Czech name in use in the Czech Republic, and Antonin, a French name in use in France, and French-speaking countries, are both considered alternate forms of Antonino. Antoñín, a Spanish name in use in Spain and Spanish-speaking countries, is a diminutive form of Antonio. As a surname it is derived from the Antonius root name. Notable people with these names include:

== Given name: Antonin ==
- Antonin Artaud (1896–1948), French theatre director, writer, actor, and artist
- Antonin Bajewski (1915–1941), Polish Franciscan friar
- Antonin Baudry (born 1975), French diplomat
- Antonin Berruyer (born 1998), French rugby union player
- Antonin Berval (1891–1966), French film actor
- Antonin Besse (1877–1951), French businessman
- Antonin Bobichon (born 1995), French footballer
- Antonin Brémond (died 1755), French Master of the Order of Preachers
- Antonin Carlès (1851–1919), French sculptor
- Antonin Cloche (1628–1720), French Master of the Order of Preachers
- Antonin d'Avrecourt (fl. 1831–1862), French playwright
- Antonin Décarie (born 1982), Canadian boxer
- Antonin Jean Desormeaux (1815–1894), French physician
- Antonin Drapier (1891–1967), French Catholic priest and diplomat
- Antonin Dubost (1842–1921), French journalist and politician
- Antonin Gadal (1877–1962), French mystic
- Antonin Galipeault (1879–1971), Canadian politician, lawyer, and judge
- Antonin Guigonnat (born 1991), French biathlete
- Antonin Guillermain (1861–1896), French Catholic missionary
- Antonin Idrac (1849–1884), French sculptor
- Antonin Koutouan (born 1983), Ivorian footballer
- Antonin Magne (1904–1983), French cyclist
- Antonin Manavian (born 1987), French hockey player
- Antonin Mercié (1845–1916), French sculptor and painter
- Antonin Michel, French Scrabble player
- Antonin Moine (1796–1849), French romantic sculptor
- Antonin de Selliers de Moranville (1852–1945), Belgian general
- Antonin Nantel (1839–1929), Canadian Catholic priest
- Antonin Claude Dominique Just de Noailles (1777–1846), French nobleman and diplomat
- Antonin-Just-Léon-Marie de Noailles (1866–1900), French nobleman
- Antonin Perbòsc (1861–1944), French poet
- Antonin Poncet (1849–1913), French surgeon
- Antonin Proust (1932–1905), French journalist and politician
- Antonin Rolland (born 1924), French cyclist
- Antonin Rouzier (born 1986), French volleyball player
- Antonin Scalia (1936–2016), Associate Justice of the Supreme Court of the United States
- Antonin Sertillanges (1863–1948), French Catholic philosopher and writer
- Antonin Sochnev (1924–2014), Soviet Russian football player and coach
- Antonin Trilles (born 1983), French footballer

== Given name: Antonín ==
- Antonín Absolon Czech canoeist
- Antonín Barák (born 1994), Czech footballer
- Antonín Barák (rowing) (born 1956), Czech rowing coxswain
- Antonín Bartoň (1908–1982), Czech skier
- Antonín Bartoněk (1926–2016), Czech philologist
- Antonín Bartoš (1910–1998), Czech soldier
- Antonín Viktor Barvitius (1823–1901), Czech architect
- Antonín Baudyš (1946–2010), Czech politician
- Antonín Bečvář (1901–1965), Czech astronomer
- Antonín Bennewitz (1833–1926), Czech classical musician
- Antonin Berousek of the Czech circus performing Berousek family
- Antonín Bořuta (born 1988), Czech ice hockey player
- Antonín Brabec (canoeist) (1946–2017), Czech canoeist
- Antonín Brabec (rugby) (born 1973), Czech rugby player
- Antonín Brož (born 1987), Czech luger
- Antonín Brus of Mohelnice (1518–1580), Moravian Archbishop of Prague
- Antonín Brych, Czech sports shooter
- Antonín Buček (born 1984), Czech footballer
- Antonín Byczanski (1887 –?), Czech sports shooter
- Antonín Carvan (1901–1959), Czech footballer
- Antonín Charvát (1899–1930), Czech cyclist
- Antonín Chittussi (1847–1891), Czech painter
- Antonín Dušek (born 1986), Czech ice hockey player
- Antonín Dvořák (1841–1904), Czech composer
- Antonín Eltschkner (1880–1961), Czech Roman Catholic priest
- Antonín Engel (1879–1958), Czech architect
- Antonín Ettrich Czech cross country skier
- Antonín Fantiš (born 1992), Czech footballer
- Antonín Fivébr (1888–1973), Czech footballer
- Antonin Fritsch (1832–1913), Czech scientist
- Antonín Hájek (born 1987), Czech ski jumper
- Antonín Havlík, Czech scholar known for Havlík's law
- Antonín Heveroch (1869–1927), Czech psychiatrist and neurologist
- Antonín Hojer (1894–1964), Czech footballer
- Antonín Holub (born 1986), Czech footballer
- Antonín Holý (1936–2012), Czech scientist
- Antonín Honig, Czech cyclist
- Antonín Hrstka (1908–?), Czech rower
- Antonín Hudeček (1872–1941), Czech painter
- Antonín Janda (1892–1960), Czech footballer
- Antonín Janoušek (1877–1941), Czech journalist and politician
- Antonín Jelínek (born 1956), Czech wrestler
- Antonín Jeřábek (born 1982), Czech ice hockey referee
- Antonín Jílek (1880–?), Czech sports shooter
- Antonín Jan Jungmann (1775–1854), Czech obstetrician and educator
- Antonín Kachlík (1923–2022), Czech film director and screenwriter
- Antonín Kalina (1902–1990), Czech resistance citizen
- Antonín Kammel (1730–1784/85), Czech composer
- Antonín Kasper Jr. (1962–2006), Czech motorcycle racer
- Antonín Kinský (born 1975), Czech footballer
- Antonín Klimek (1937–2005), Czech historian
- Antonín Kraft (1749–1820), Czech composer
- Antonín Křapka (born 1994), Czech footballer
- Antonín Kohout (1919–2013), Czech cellist
- Antonín Koláček (born 1959), Czech manager and entrepreneur
- Antonín Kraft (1749–1820), Czech composer
- Antonín Kramerius (1939–2019), Czech footballer
- Antonín Kratochvíl (born 1947), Czech photojournalist
- Antonín Kříž (biathlete) (born 1953), Czech biathlete
- Antonín Kříž (cyclist) (born 1943), Czech cyclist
- Antonín Kubálek (1935–2011), Czech classical pianist
- Antonín Langweil (1791–1837), Czech artist
- Antonín Lhota (1812–1905), Czech painter
- Antonín J. Liehm (1924–2020) Czech journalist
- Antonín Liška (1924–2003), Czech Roman Catholic clergyman
- Antonín Machek (1775–1844), Czech painter
- Antonín Maleček (1909–1964), Czech table tennis player
- Antonín Malinkovič (1930–2016), Czech rower
- Antonín Mánes (1784–1843), Czech painter and draftsman
- Antonín Máša (1935–2001), Czech film director and screenwriter
- Antonín Melka (born 1990), Czech ice hockey player
- Antonín Mikala, Czech fencer
- Antonín Mlejnský (born 1973), Czech footballer
- Antonín Molčík (1939–2014), Czech actor
- Antonín Mrkos (1918–1996), Czech astronomer
- Antonin Nechodoma (1877–1928), Czech architect
- Antonín Novotný (1904–1975), Czech politician
- Antonín Novotný (chess composer) (1827–1871), Czech chess composer
- Antonín Panenka (born 1948), Czech footballer
- Antonín Pechanec (born 1991), Czech ice hockey player
- Antonín Perič (1896–1980), Czech cyclist
- Antonín Perner (1899–1973), Czech footballer
- Antonín Petrof (1839–1915), Czech piano maker
- Antonín Plachý (born 1971), Czech footballer
- Antonín Pospíšil (1903–1973), Czech politician
- Antonín Prachař (born 1962), Czech politician
- Antonín Presl (born 1988), Czech footballer
- Antonín Přidal (1935–2017), Czech translator
- Antonín Procházka (actor) (born 1953) Czech actor, playwright and director
- Antonín Procházka (painter) (1882–1945), Czech painter and graphic artist
- Antonín Procházka (volleyball) (born 1942), Czech volleyball player
- Antonín Puč (1907–1988), Czech footballer
- Antonin Raymond (1888–1976), Czech architect
- Antonín Reichenauer (c. 1694–1730), Czech composer
- Antonín Rezek (1853–1909), Czech political historian
- Antonín Rosa (born 1986), Czech footballer
- Antonín Rükl (1932–2016), Czech astronomer, cartographer, and author
- Antonín Růsek (born 1999), Czech footballer
- Antonín Růžička (born 1993), Czech ice hockey player
- Antonín Rýgr (1921–1989), Czech footballer
- Antonín Siegl (1880–?), Czech sports shooter
- Antonín Skopový (1902–?), Czech wrestler
- Antonín Slavíček (1870–1910), Czech painter
- Antonín Šolc (1928–1996), Czech footballer
- Antonín Sova (1864–1928), Czech poet
- Antonín Šponar (1920–2002), Czech alpine skier
- Antonín Staněk (born 1966) Czech politician
- Antonín Stavjaňa (born 1963), Czech ice hockey player
- Antonín Cyril Stojan (1851–1923), Czech Roman Catholic prelate
- Antonín Šváb Jr. (born 1974), Czech motorcycle racer
- Antonín Švehla (1873–1933), Czech politician
- Antonín Svoboda (athlete) (1900–1965), Czech sprint athlete
- Antonín Svoboda (computer scientist) (1907–1980), Czech computer scientist, mathematician, electrical engineer, and researcher
- Antonín Benjamin Svojsík (1876–1938), Czech scouting leader
- Antonín Švorc (1934–2011), Czech operatic singer
- Antonin Tron (born 1984), French fashion designer
- Antonín Tučapský (1928–2014), Czech composer
- Antonín Vaníček (born 1998), Czech footballer
- Antonín Vodička (1907–1975), Czech footballer
- Antonín Vranický (1761–1820), Czech composer
- Antonín Žalský (born 1980), Czech shot putter
- Antonín Zápotocký (1884–1957), Czech politician

== Nickname ==
- Antoñín (footballer, born 2000), nickname of Antonio Cortés Heredia (born 2000), Spanish footballer
- Antonin Idrac, nickname of Jean-Antoine-Marie Idrac (1849–1884), French sculptor

== Surname ==
- Arnold Antonin (born 1942), Haitian film director
- Magdalena Saint Antonin (born 1965), Argentine skier
- Théodore Antonin, French football manager

== Middle name ==
- Alexandre-Antonin Taché (1823–1894), Canadian Roman Catholic priest
- Bedřich Antonín Wiedermann (1883–1951), Czech composer
- František Antonín Míča (1694–1744), Czech conductor
- František Antonín Nickerl (1813–1871), Czech entomologist
- Frédéric-Antonin Breysse (1907–2001), French cartoonist and illustrator
- Jan Antonín Baťa (1898–1965), Czech shoe manufacturer
- Jan Antonín Duchoslav (born 1965), Czech actor
- Jan Antonín Koželuh (1738–1814), Czech composer
- Jan Antonín Losy (c. 1650–1721), Czech composer and aristocrat
- Jan Antonín Vocásek (1706–1757), Czech painter
- Josef Antonín Hůlka (1851–1920), Czech Roman Catholic clergyman
- Josef Antonín Plánický (1691–1732), Czech composer
- Josef Antonín Sehling (1710–1756), Czech composer
- Rudolf Antonín Dvorský (1899–1966), Czech singer and jazz musician
- Stefan Antonin Mdzewski (1653–1718), Polish Roman Catholic prelate
- Václav Antonín Chotek real name of Count Wenzel Chotek of Chotkow and Wognin (1674–1754), Czech nobleman and politician

== Fictional characters ==
- Antonin Dolohov, Death Eater character in the Harry Potter novels and films

== See also ==
- Antoin (disambiguation)
- Antolin (name)
- Antoni
- Antonia (name)
- Antonic
- Antonie (given name)
- Antonik
- Antonina (name)
- Antonine (name)
- Antonini (name)
- Antonino (name)
- Antoniny (disambiguation)
- Antonio
- Antonis
- Antoniu
