= Antonin =

Antonin may refer to:

== People ==
- Antonin (name)

== Places ==
Poland

- Antonin, Jarocin County, Greater Poland Voivodeship
- Antonin, Kalisz County, Greater Poland Voivodeship
- Antonin, Oborniki County, Greater Poland Voivodeship
- Antonin, Gmina Przygodzice, Ostrów County, Greater Poland Voivodeship
- Antonin, Poznań County, Greater Poland Voivodeship
- Antonin, Gmina Krzykosy, Środa County, Greater Poland Voivodeship
- Antonin, Sieradz County, Łódź Voivodeship
- Antonin, Zduńska Wola County, Łódź Voivodeship
- Antonin, Lublin Voivodeship
- Antonin, Masovian Voivodeship
- Antonin, Podlaskie Voivodeship
- Antonin, Pomeranian Voivodeship
- Antonin, part of Nowe Miasto, Poznań, Greater Poland Voivodeship

== See also ==
- Antolin (name)
- Antonina (disambiguation)
- Antonini (disambiguation)
- Antonino (disambiguation)
- Antoniny (disambiguation)
- Antoninus (disambiguation)
- Antoniu
- Antonen
- Antoñín (born 2000), Antonio Cortés Heredia, Spanish footballer
