= Transylvanianism =

Romanian cultural movement

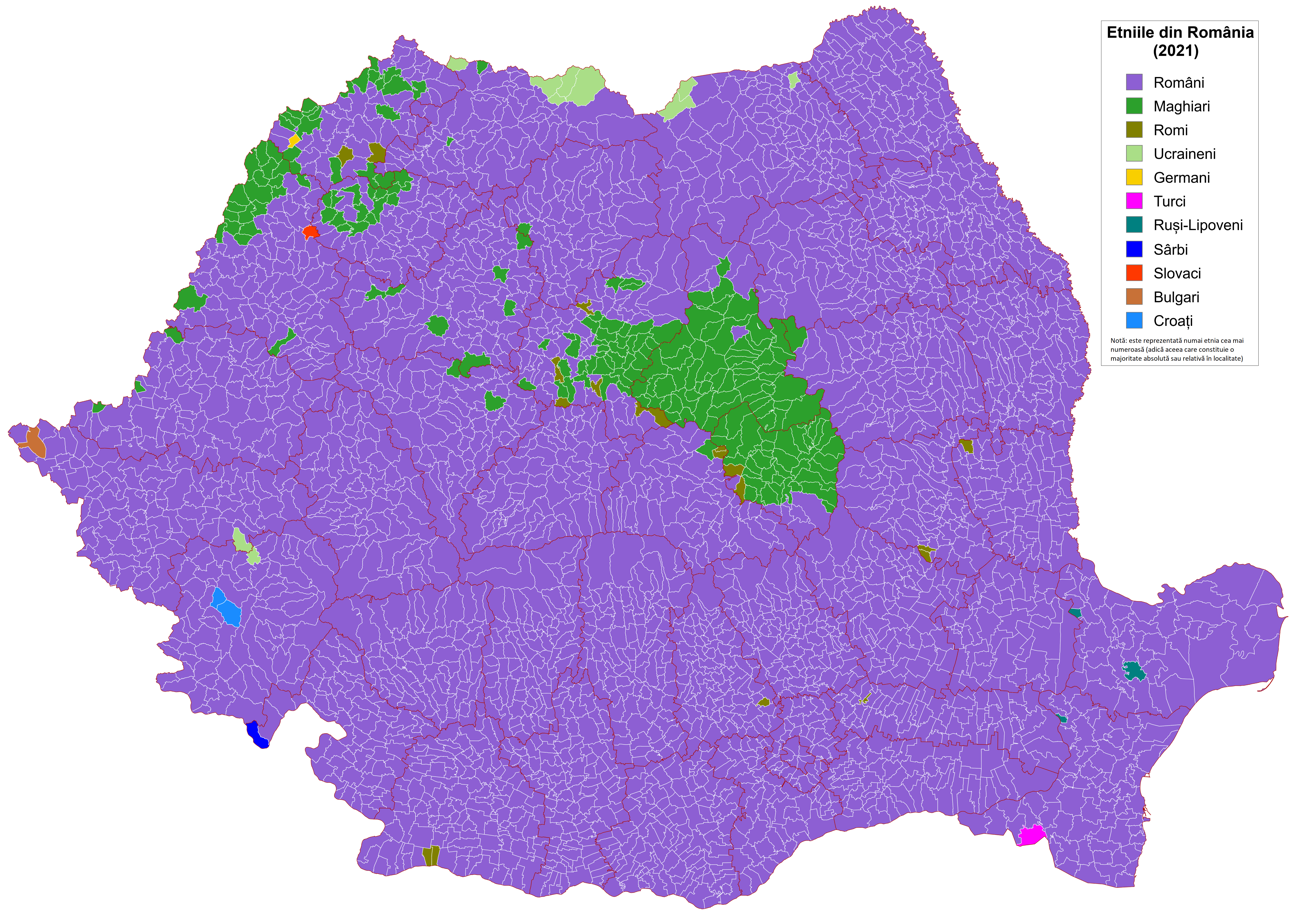
Ethnic map of Romania according to the 2021 Romanian census. Transylvania is predominantly inhabited by Romanians and Hungarians.

Transylvanianism (Romanian: transilvanism; Hungarian: transzilvanizmus) is a political and cultural movement advocating for historical acknowledgement and peaceful multiethnic co-existence between Transylvania's various ethnic communities.

It has manifested within both the Hungarian minority and the Romanian majority communities of the region.

== History ==
The Transylvanianist movement surrounded Károly Kós, who established a programme for Transylvanian Hungarians on the basis of their lack of adaptability in the aftermath of the Treaty of Trianon of 1920. The famous architect, upon his urgent arrival in Transylvania from Budapest in 1918, asserted that Transylvania was a specific entity and home to the three Transylvanian ethnic communities that have been living together for centuries.

Károly Kós wrote in 1921 that "we can permanently wipe the tears on our cheeks, for a gate has now closed forever". He was, at that time, already aware that Hungarian revisionism had no essence and that national mourning was pathetic and nonsensical. "But I know: we must begin the hard work again". He, instead of mourning, fought intensively and proposed a more peaceful and European solution: collaboration, coexistence and conservation of a cultural and national identity in a way in which people would not slander each other. "We need to work if we desire to live – we desire to live, thus we will work!", he said with an optimism rarely present in the Hungarian press of the 20s. Further, Kós affirmed that "there is no reason for us to be sorrowful, to aggravate and intensify hatred or any differences but rather work, towards a new identity, towards 'new bastions', the ones which Transylvanianism conveys".

== Literature ==
Transylvanianism appeared in literature at the initiative of Count János Kemény who invited, in 1926, 28 of the most prominent Hungarian literary figures from Romania, to his castle in Brâncovenești, figures who had accepted the Hungarian fate. At his castle a cultural association named Helikon was then founded, whose meetings were attended by Lajos Áprily, Mária Berde, Jenő Dsida, Zoltán Jékely, Károly Kós, Aladár Kuncz, József Nyírő, Sándor Reményik, Ferenc Szemlér, Áron Tamási, László Tompa, Albert Wass and many others.

== Architecture ==
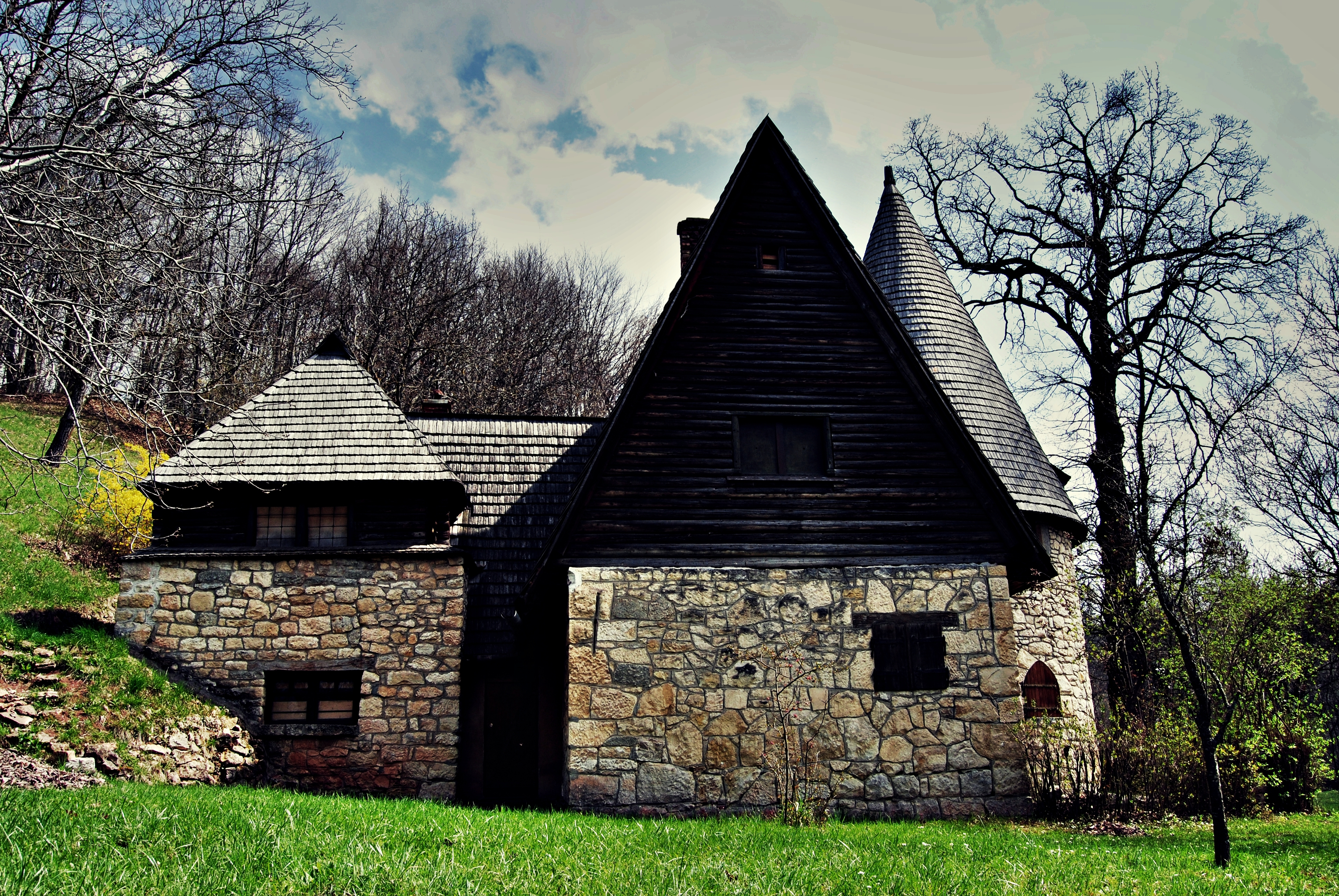
Varjúvár, Stana

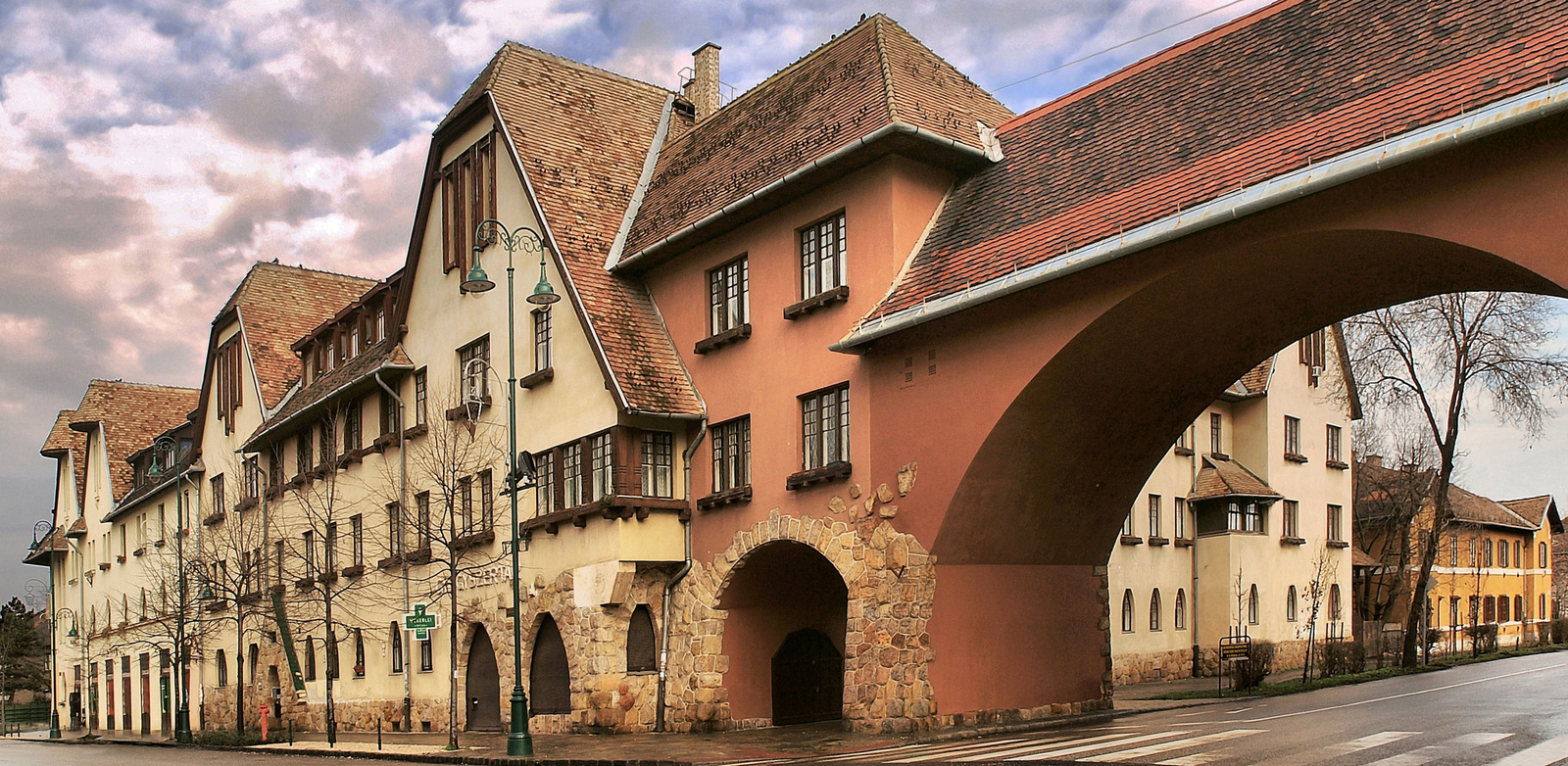
Wekerle district, Budapest

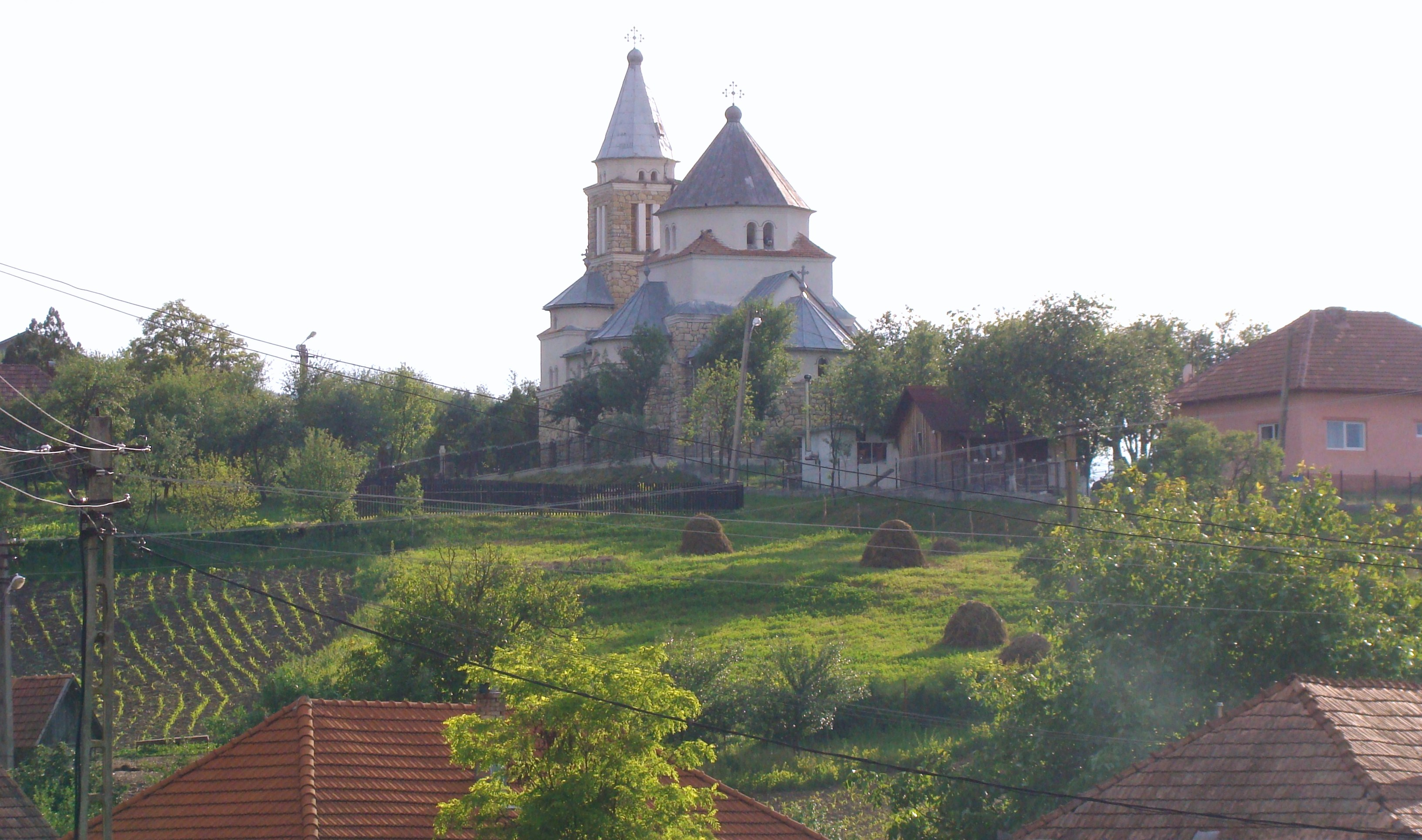
Greek Catholic Church of Feiurdeni
(presently Orthodox)

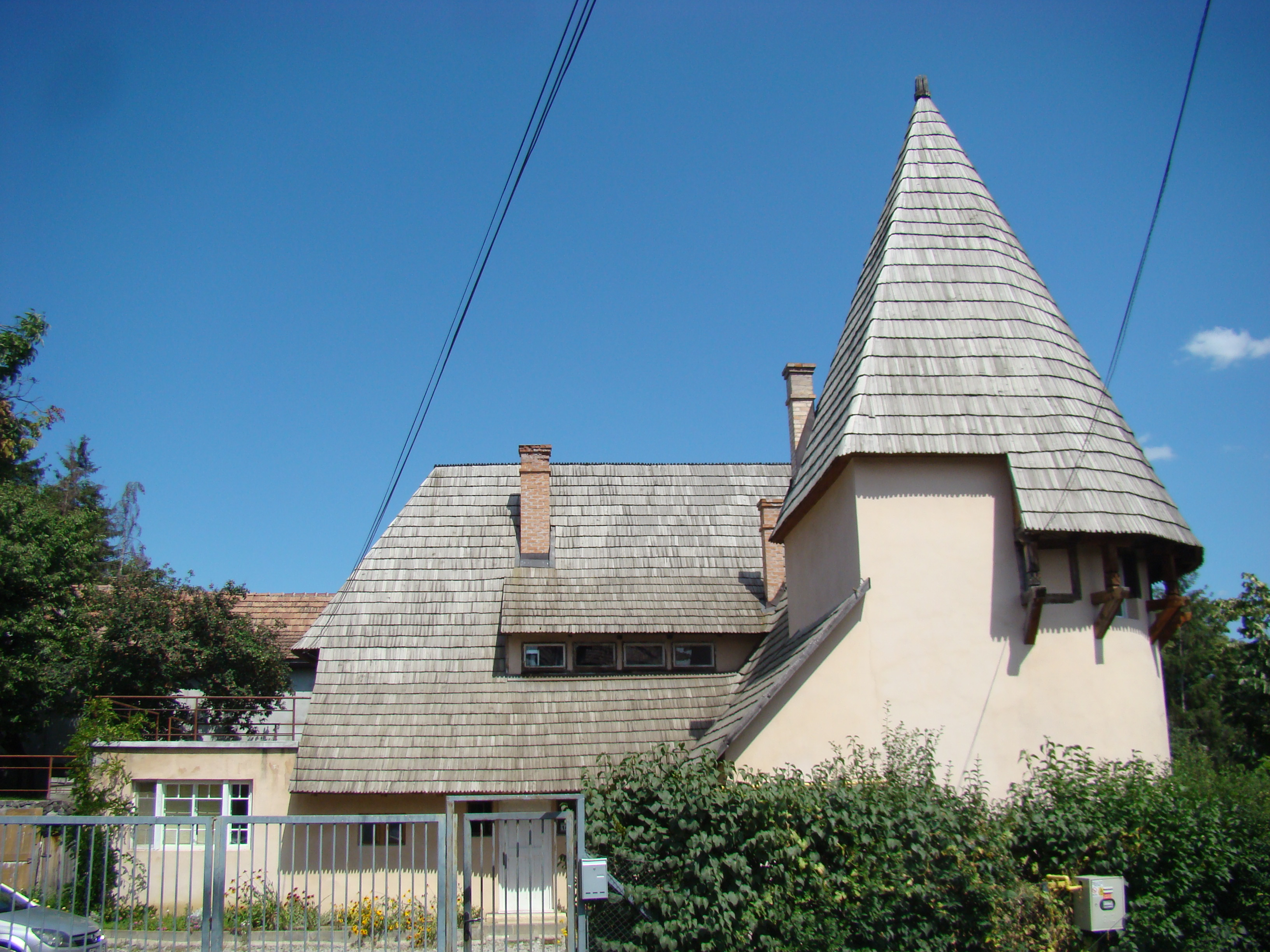
House from Cluj, whose project was finalised by architect Károly Kós in 1900

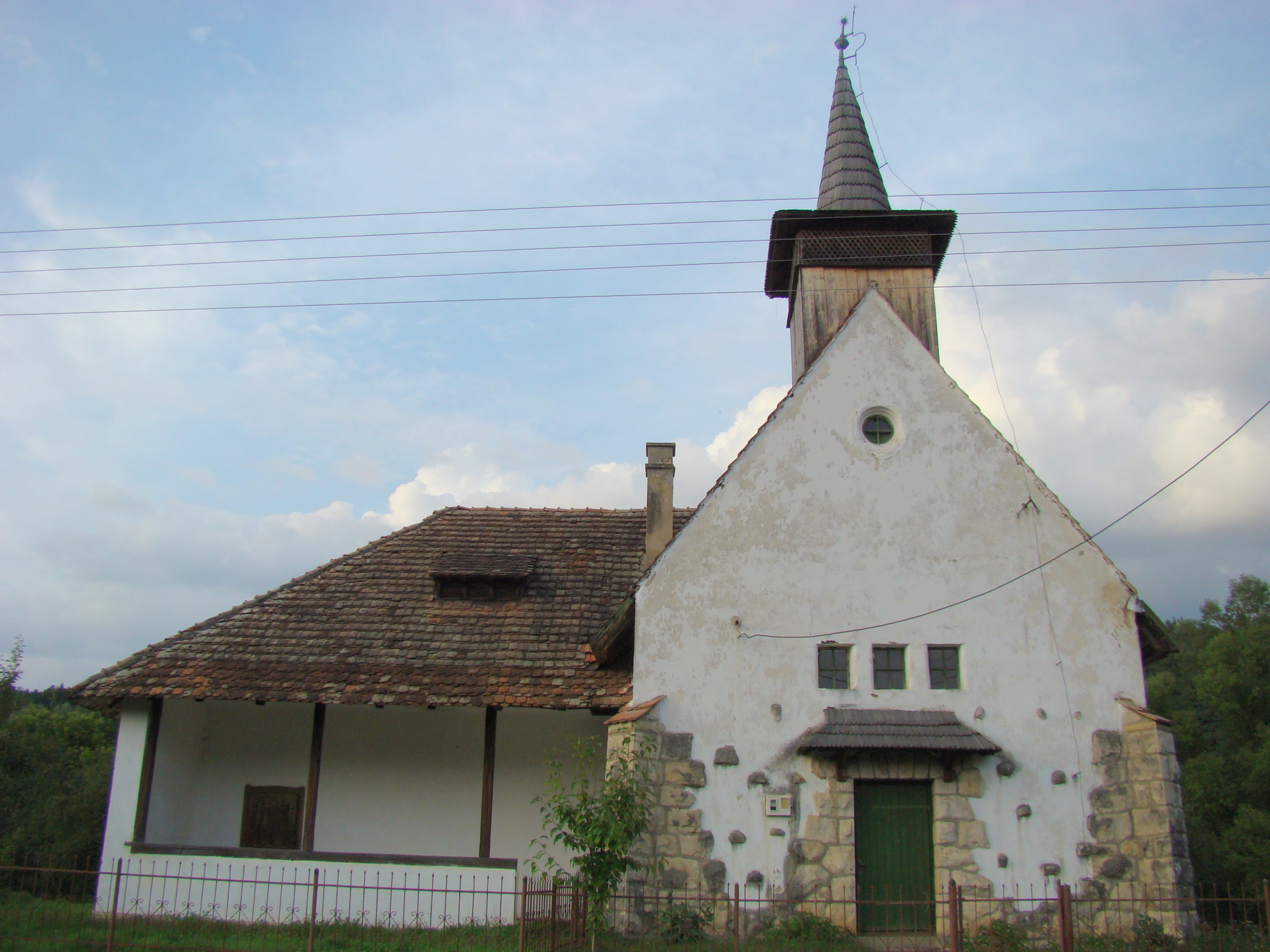
Reformed Church of Băbiu, Sălaj county

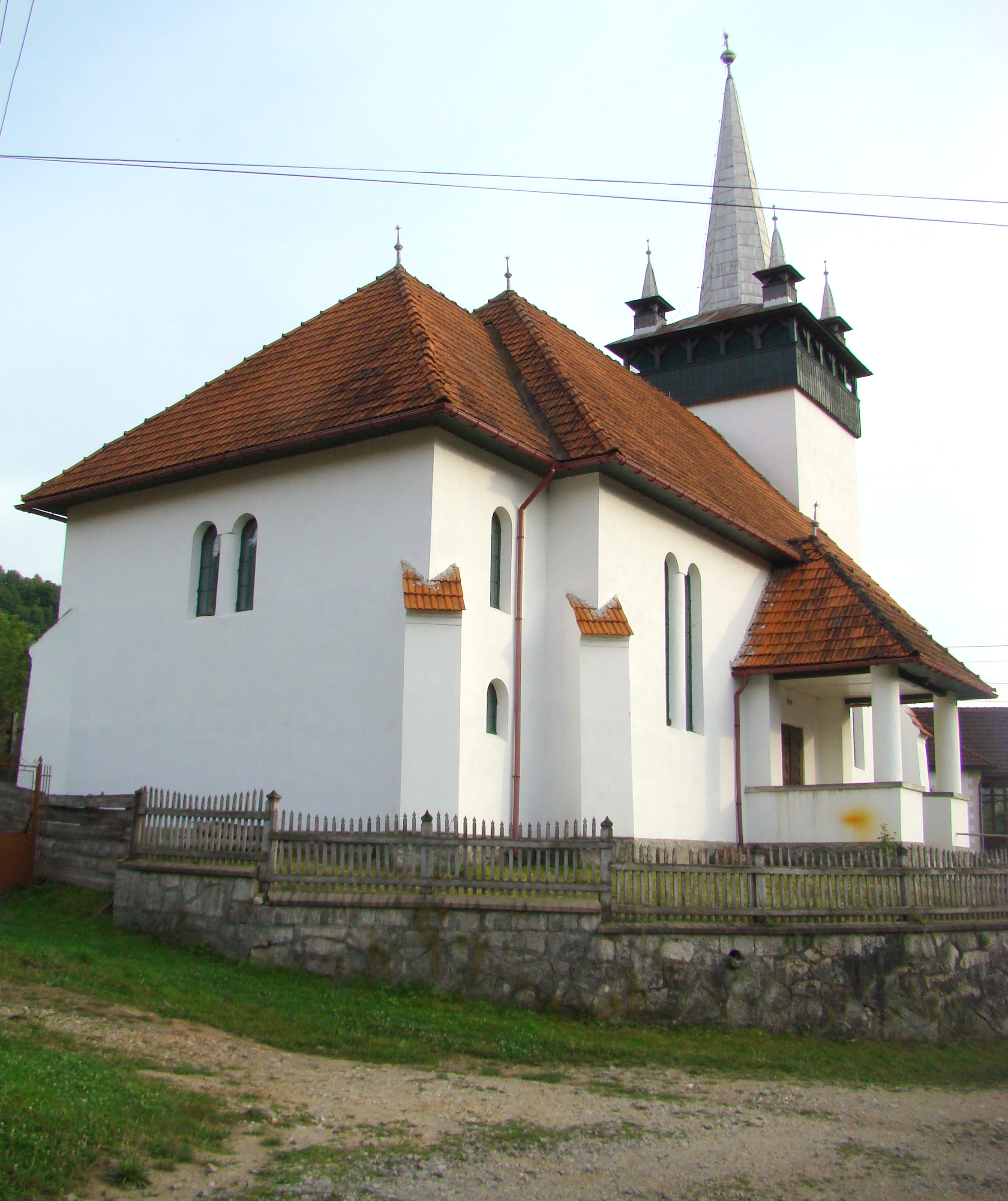
Reformed Church of Tetișu, Sălaj county

== See also ==
- Károly Kós
- Union of Hungary and Romania
