= Antoninus =

Antoninus is a Latin masculine given name. It may refer to:

== Ancient Romans ==
Note: Some saints also lived in ancient Rome.

- Antoninus (philosopher), Neoplatonist philosopher of the 4th century
- Antoninus (turncoat), Roman who joined the Sassanid Empire and assisted Shapur II in the siege of Amida
- Antoninus Liberalis, Greek grammarian who lived between the first and third centuries AD
- Antoninus Pius (86–161), Roman emperor from 138 to 161
- Antoninus of Rome (died 186), a public executioner in Rome who converted to Christianity, saint and martyr
- Gaius Arrius Antoninus, 2nd century Roman senator
- Gnaeus Arrius Antoninus (born AD 31), maternal grandfather of Antoninus Pius
- Honoratus Antoninus, 5th century Roman Catholic Bishop
- Lucius Caesennius Antoninus (c. 95–after 128), Roman aristocrat and consul
- Marcus Aurelius Antoninus (disambiguation), several emperors with the same regnal name
- Quintus Haterius Antoninus, 1st century Roman consul

== Fictional characters ==
- Antoninus, in the film Spartacus, Spartacus's right-hand man, played by Tony Curtis

== See also ==
- William Everson (poet) (1912–1994), also known as Brother Antoninus, American poet
- Antonin (disambiguation)
- Antonius, nomen of the gens Antonia, one of the most important plebeian families in Rome
