= Saint Antoninus =

Saint Antoninus may refer to:

- Antoninus of Rome (died 186), martyr
- Antoninus of Pamiers (first, second, fourth, or fifth century), missionary and martyr, called the "Apostle of the Rouergue"
- Antoninus of Syria (died 303), martyr
- Antoninus of Piacenza (died 303), patron saint of Piacenza
- Antoninus Fontana (Antonino Fontana), archbishop of Milan (died 661)
- Antoninus of Florence (1389–1459)
- Antoninus of Sorrento (died 830 AD)
