= Perner =

Perner is a surname. Notable people with the surname include:

- Antonín Perner (1899–1973), Czechoslovak footballer
- Carlos Perner (born 1947), Argentine alpine skier
- Jan Perner (1815–1845), Czech engineer
- Jaroslav Perner (1869–1947), Czech paleontologist
- Wolfgang Perner (1967–2019), Austrian biathlete
