= Antonini =

Antonini may refer to

- Antonini (name)
- Nerva–Antonine dynasty or Antonines, that ruled the Roman Empire from 96 AD to 192 AD
- Palazzo Antonini, Udine in Italy
- Antonine Itinerary, a 3rd-century register of the stations and distances along roads of the Roman Empire
- Trechus antonini, a species of ground beetle

== See also ==
- Antonin (disambiguation)
