= Antonine (name) =

Feminine given name

Antonine is a Swedish, Danish, and Norwegian feminine given name that is a form of Antonina and a diminutive form of Antonia that is used in Norway, Denmark, Sweden and Greenland. It is also a masculine name. Notable people with this name include the following individuals:

== Female ==
- Antonine de Gérando (1844-1914), French-born Hungarian translator and educator
- Antonine Maillet (1929–2025), Canadian writer
- Antonine Meunier (1877–1972), French ballerina

== Male ==
- Antonine Barada (1807 – 1885), American folk hero
- Antonine Tibesar (1909 – 1992), American Franciscan friar

== See also ==
- Antonie (given name)
- Antonin (name)
- Antonina (name)
- Antonini (name)
- Antonino (name)
- Antoniny (disambiguation)
