= Antonini (name) =

Antonini is an Italian surname derived from Antonius. It is also an occasional masculine given name. People with this name, both as a given name and surname, are listed below.

== Given name ==
- Antonini Čulina (born 1992), Croatian football player

== Surname ==
- Alberto Antonini (born 1959), Italian oenologist and winery consultant
- Alessio Antonini (born 1949), Italian racing cyclist
- Alfredo Antonini (1901–1983), Italian-American symphony conductor and composer
- Ernesto Ramos Antonini (1898–1963), Puerto Rican politician
- Fermín Antonini (1997), Argentine professional footballer
- Gabriele Antonini (1938–2018), Italian film, stage and television actor
- Giles of Viterbo (Giles Antonini), a 16th-century Italian cardinal, theologian, orator, humanist and poet
- Giovanni Antonini (born 1965), Italian conductor and flute soloist
- Giuseppe Antonini (1914–1989), Italian football midfielder and manager
- Guido Alejandro Antonini Wilson, Venezuelan-American entrepreneur, part of the 2007 suitcase scandal involving Venezuela and Argentina
- Jean-Claude Antonini (1940–2019), French politician
- Joseph E. Antonini (born 1941), American businessman
- Juan Antonini (born 1999), Argentine professional footballer
- Louise Antonini (1771–1861), French woman of the French Navy during the Revolutionary period
- Luca Antonini (jurist) (born 1963), Italian lawyer, jurist, and constitutional law professor
- Luca Antonini (born 1982), Italian football player
- Luigi Antonini (1883–1968), American trade union leader
- Matias Antonini (born 1998), Brazilian footballer
- Michael Antonini (born 1985), American baseball pitcher
- Orlando Antonini (born 1944), Italian prelate of the Catholic Church
- Pierre Antonini, French mathematician and astronomer
- Simone Antonini (born 1991), Italian racing cyclist
- Stefania Antonini (born 1970), Italian football goalkeeper
- Valerio Antonini (born 1975), Italian agricultural commodities trader

== See also ==
- Antoniani
- Antonin (name)
- Antonina (name)
- Antonine (name)
- Antonino (name)
- Antoniny (disambiguation)
- Antonioni (surname)
- Luigi Antognini
