= Hajongard cemetery =

Cemetery in Cluj-Napoca, Romania

Coordinates: 46.7800°N 23.5594°E

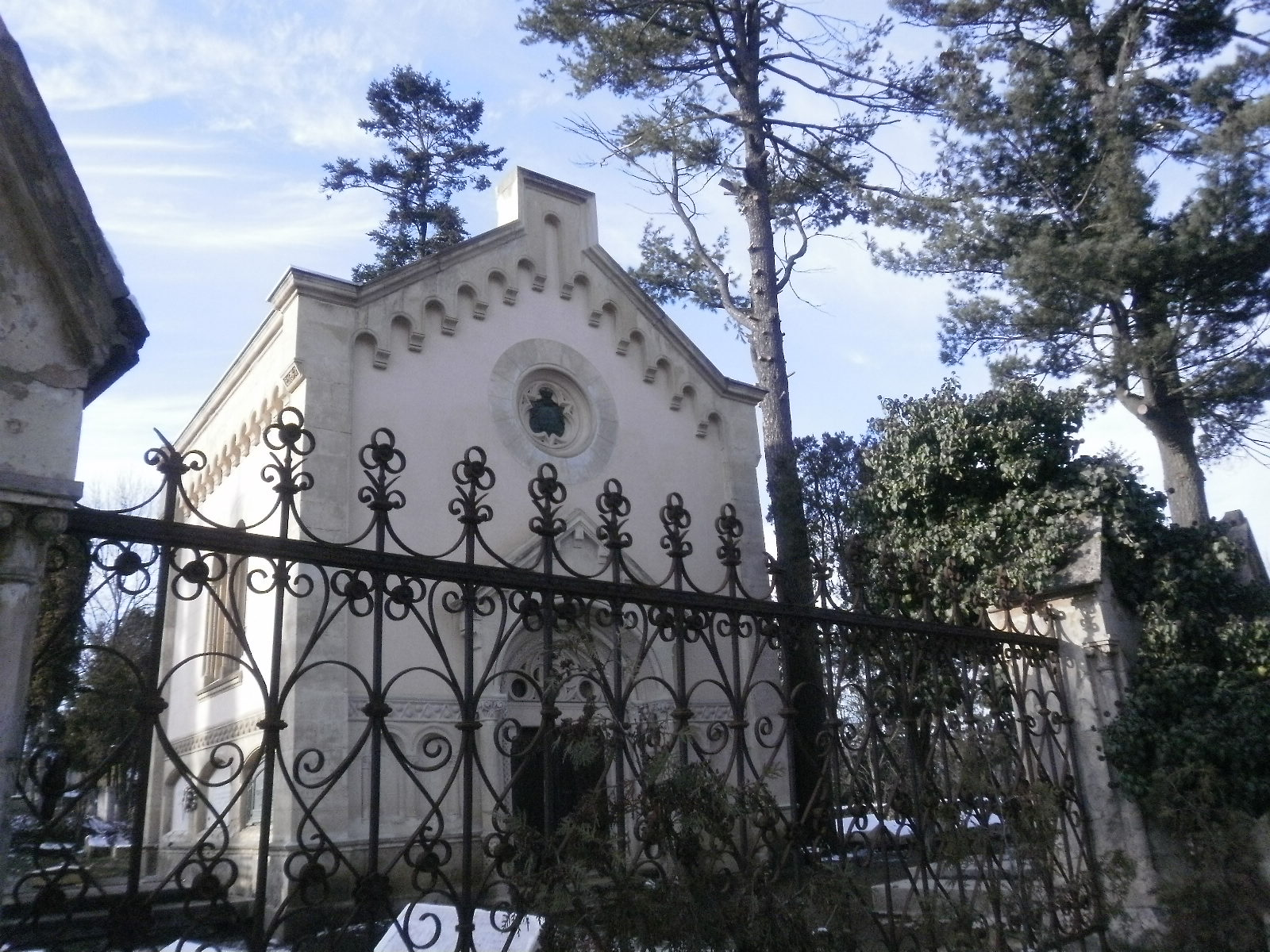
Bethlen family chapel at Hajongard Cemetery

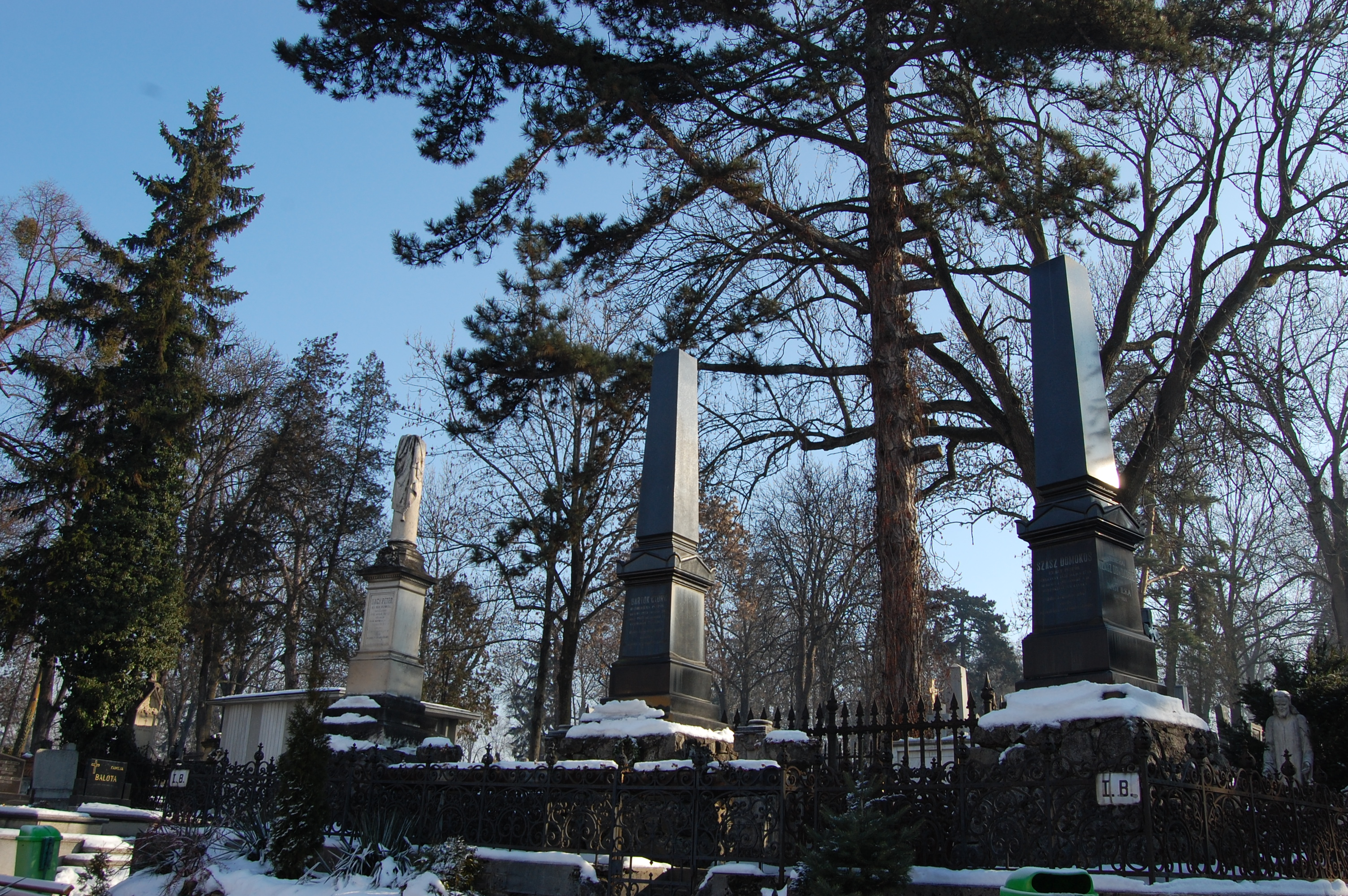
View of the cemetery

Hajongard cemetery (officially Central Cemetery, in Hungarian Házsongárdi temető, from German Hasengarten), on Avram Iancu Street, is one of the oldest cemeteries in Cluj-Napoca, Romania, founded in the sixteenth century. It is one of the most picturesque sights of the city. It covers an area of approximately 14 hectares (35 acres).

== Notable interments ==
- Ion Agârbiceanu (1882–1963), writer, journalist, politician, academician and archpriest
- János Apáczai Csere (1625–1659), humanist scholar
- Miklós Bánffy (1873–1950), writer, illustrator, scenographer and foreign minister of Hungary
- Matei Boilă (1926–2015), politician and priest
- Ilona Borsai (1924–1982), musicologist, music historian, folk music researcher
- Sámuel Brassai (1797–1897), linguist and teacher
- Nicolae Bretan (1887–1968), opera composer, baritone, conductor, and music critic
- Constantin Daicoviciu (1898–1973), historian, archaeologist, professor, and communist politician
- Aurel Ciupe (1900–1985), painter
- Doina Cornea (1929–2018), human rights activist and French language professor
- Gheorghe Dima (1847–1925), composer, conductor, and teacher
- Jenő Dsida (1907–1938), Hungarian poet, editor, translator
- Antonine de Gérando (1844-1914), translator, non-fiction writer, and educator
- Iuliu Hațieganu (1885–1959), physician
- Gizella Hervay (1934–1982), Hungarian poet, writer, editor, translator
- Emil Isac (1886–1954), poet and literary critic
- Jenő Janovics (1872–1945), actor, scenarist, and director
- Aureliu Manea (1945–2014), theatre director, actor, and writer
- Adrian Marino (1921–2005), essayist, critic, historian, and literary theorist
- Lajos Martin (1827–1897), mathematician and engineer
- Imre Mikó (1805–1876), governor of Transylvania
- John Paget (1808–1892), English agriculturist and author on Hungary
- Tiberiu Popoviciu (1906–1975), mathematician
- Emil Racoviță (1868–1947), savant, explorer, and founder of biospeleology
- Sándor Reményik (1890–1941), poet
- Raluca Ripan (1894–1972), chemist
- Alexandru Constantin Diaconescu (1955-2021), historian, archaeologist, professor
