= Antoniny =

Antoniny can refer to:

- Antoniny, a rural settlement in Ukraine
- Antoniny, Chodzież County, a village in Poland
- Antoniny, Szamotuły County, a village in Poland

== See also ==
- Antonin (disambiguation)
- Antonina (disambiguation)
- Antonine (name)
- Antonini (disambiguation)
- Antonino (disambiguation)
