= Ilona Borsai =

Hungarian ethnomusicologist (1924–1982)

- Born: 10 April 1924; Cluj
- Died: 8 July 1982 (aged 58); Budapest
- Burial place: Hajongard cemetery
- Education: Bolyai University; Franz Liszt Academy of Music
- Occupations: ethnomusicologist folklorist

Ilona Borsai (10 April 1924 – 8 July 1982) was a Romanian-born Hungarian musicologist, music historian, folk music researcher, choir director and high school singing teacher. She was also a collector of the melodies of the Coptic religion and the Egyptian musical tradition.

== Career ==
She was born in Cluj, Romania to ethnic Hungarian parents András Borsai, an electrical engineer at the Cluj branch of the Ganz factory, and Ilona Herz.

She completed her elementary and secondary school education in her hometown. Between 1934 and 1940, she studied piano, but had to stop due to tendinitis. In 1942, she graduated from the Regnum Marianum Girls' High School. She earned a teaching certificate in Latin-Greek-French at Bolyai University in 1946. Between 1947 and 1948, she was a student of folklore and pedagogy at the Hungarian State Academy of Music in Cluj. After that, she moved to Budapest to continue her studies and in 1951, she earned a degree in music teaching and conducting, and continued her studies in 1961 in musicology at the Franz Liszt Academy of Music. Between 1951 and 1956, she was a folk music performer at the Ethnographic Department of the Institute of Folk Art. Between 1961 and 1974, she worked in the Folk Music Research Group of the Hungarian Academy of Sciences.

She won a scholarship to go on study trips to Egypt between 1966–1967 and she returned there in 1969 and 1971. Between 1974–1979, she was a research associate at the Institute of Musicology of the Hungarian Academy of Sciences.

=== Collections ===
Hungarian folk song from Hollókő, collected by Ilona Borsai in 1963.

Her collections primarily covered the melodies of the Coptic liturgy. As a folk music researcher, she examined the musical life of the Hungarian Mátra region, and she collected the songs of the Summas, folk nursery rhymes, and singing games. She also contributed to László Dobszay's book The Hungarian Song (1984).

According to one source: "Her pioneering research into the details of the historical, analytical, and liturgical significance of Coptic music opened the field of Coptic musicology and defined its direction. Her contribution has had an impact not only on Coptic studies but also on all research concerning music whose historical roots have been transmitted through the centuries by oral tradition."

She retired in 1978 and died at 58 in Budapest on 8 July 1982. Her funeral service before cremation was held at the Budapest Farkasrét Cemetery and her burial took place at the Hajongard cemetery in Cluj-Napoca, Romania.

== Personal life ==
Her paternal grandparents were: Áron Borsai 1866–1942 (until 1900 Áron Wettenstein) a doctor, and Laura Zimmermann. Her maternal grandfather: Sándor Herz (1875–1939) was a dentist. Her father's sister and her aunt were Mária Borsai (1906–1990), a storyteller and ethnographer, and Andrásné Huszár Borsai Piroska. Her mother's brother, Ottó Herz (1894–1976), was a pianist. Her brother was Endre Borsai, a mechanical engineer.

== Selected recordings ==
- Dádili's Swallow. Folktales and Children's Games from Galgamács (Moldován Domokossal; Budapest, 1981)
- Christmas in Galgamács: Christmas and New Year's customs, folk songs, nursery rhymes, folk games in Galgamács (Budapest, 1987)

== Memberships ==
Borsai was a member of the Coptic Archaeological Society, the Hungarian Ethnographical Society, the Association of Hungarian Musicians, the Hungarian Society of Studies of Antiquities, the International Association of Hungarian Studies, the Hungarian Kodály Society and the International Association of Coptic Studies.
