= Gizella Hervay =

Hungarian writer (1934–1982)

- Born: October 14, 1934; Makó, Hungary
- Died: July 2, 1982 (aged 47); Budapest, Hungary
- Occupations: poet; writer; literary translator
- Spouse: Domokos Szilágyi (m. 1960, div. 1963)
- Children: Attila Szilágyi (1961–1977)

Gizella Hervay (Makó, October 14, 1934 – Budapest, July 2, 1982) Transylvanian Hungarian poet, writer and literary translator. Wife of poet Szilágyi Domokos.

== Biography ==
Born to Tamás Hervay (1900–1973) and Lily Julianna Sipos (1914–?) in Makó, Hungary, into a prominent family that gradually became more destitute. Her father held various local government positions, but lost his job in 1941, after which the family was splintered. Gizella moved in with her grandmother in Budapest. She was reunited with her mother after World War II in Zalău (Zilah), Romania, and completed her secondary education there (1952). She went on to study at Szentgyörgyi István Színművészeti Főiskola (1952–1953) and earned a degree in Hungarian language and literature from Bolyai University (1956). Here, she met Domokos Szilágyi. She worked as an editor of Napsugár (1956–67) and Ifjúmunkás (1957–59), and taught at the Hungarian lyceum in Bucharest (1959–1961). She later joined the staff of the public education periodical Művelődés (1964–1966) and returned to Ifjúmunkás (1968–71).

She and Domokos Szilágyi married in the fall of 1960. Their son Attila Szilágyi was born on September 21, 1961. They lived in difficult circumstances in a room with no private bath. She and Szilágyi divorced in the fall of 1963.

Hervay's first volume of poetry was published in 1963. In subsequent years, she published several volumes of poetry and two collections of children's tales written for her son Attila, nicknamed Kobak. Her work garnered increasing recognition, culminating in her being awarded the poetry prize of the Romanian Writers' Guild in 1973.

Hervay's ex-husband Szilágyi committed suicide in September, 1976. She had moved to Budapest in that same year, and planned to have her son join her the following year. In March, 1977, her then 15-year-old son Attila lost his life in the Vrancea earthquake. These personal tragedies took a lasting toll, even as she continued to write and receive psychiatric treatment. Finally, after multiple attempts, she took her own life in June, 1982, in Budapest.

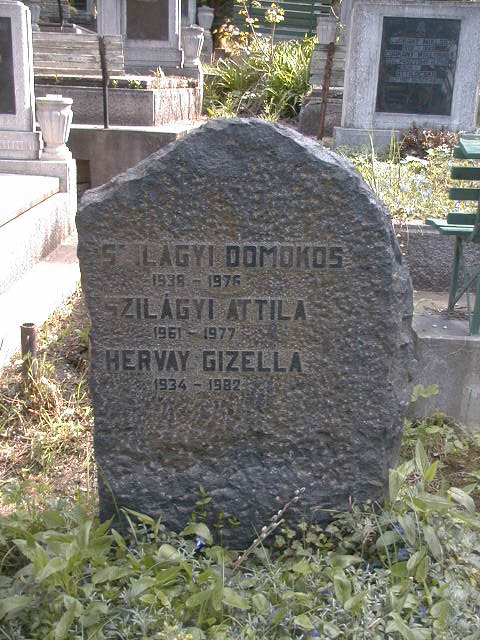
The grave of Gizella Hervay, Domokos Szilágyi and their son Attila Szilágyi at Hajongard Cemetery in Cluj-Napoca (Kolozsvár).

Gizella Hervay, Domokos Szilágyi and their son Attila Szilágyi are buried in the same grave in Hajongard cemetery in Cluj-Napoca (Kolozsvár).

== Publications ==
- 1963 – Virág a végtelenben (poems)
- 1966 – Reggeltől halálig (poems)
- 1966 – Kobak könyve (children's tales)
- 1968 – Kobak második könyve (children's tales)
- 1968 – Tőmondatok (poems)
- 1968 – A félszemű küklopsz meséje; Homérosz Odüsszeiája nyomán; Ifjúsági, Bucharest
- 1973 – Űrlap (poems)
- 1978 – Zuhanások (oratory for three voices)
- 1978 – A mondat folytatása (collected poems)
- 1978 – Kettészelt madár (poems)
- 1980 – Száműzött szivárvány (poems)
- 1980 – Hervay Gizella 1934–1982 (vocational college journal entries); edited by Bakacsi Gyula, B. Kiss Tamás; MKKE, Budapest
- 1983 – Lódenkabát Keleteurópa szegén (poems)
- 1983 – Életfa (children's poems)
- 1999 – Dúha vo vyhnanstve; Slovak translation by Ľubomír Navrátil; AB-art, Bratislava
- 1999 – Az idő körei (collected poems); edited by Balázs Imre József; Kriterion, Cluj-Napoca

== Awards ==
- Romanian Writers' Guild Prize (1973)
- Magyar Művészetért díj (posthumous) (1993)
