= Union of Hungary and Romania =

Unsuccessful historical proposal to unite Hungary and Romania

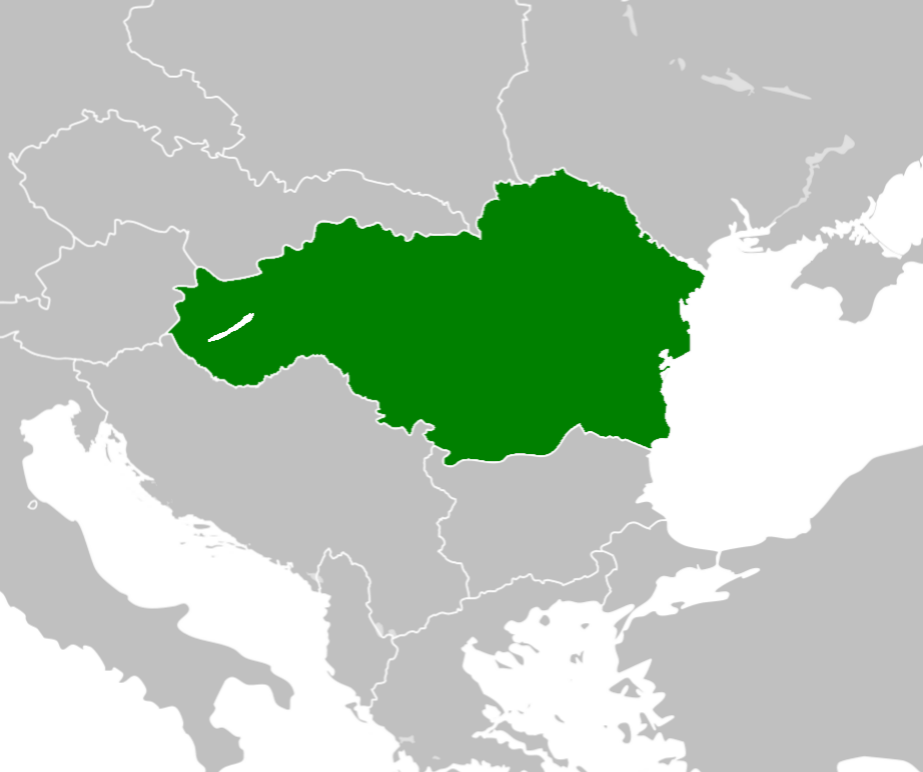
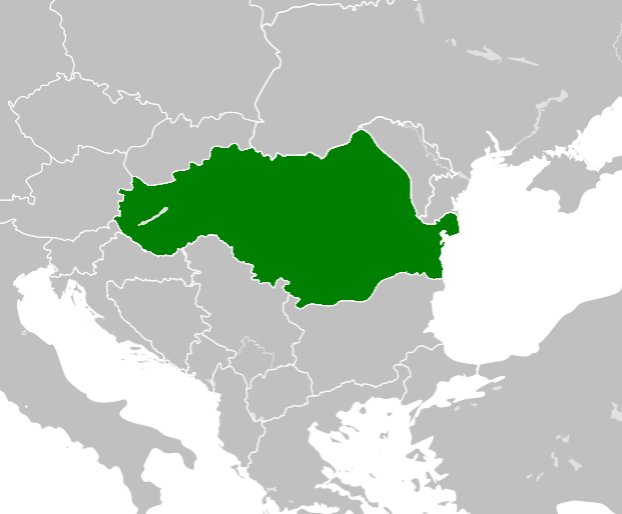
Map of a proposed Hungarian–Romanian union in the interbellum after the 1920 Treaty of Trianon (top) and if it were proposed at present (bottom)

The union of Hungary and Romania comprises proposed unsuccessful 20th-century, mostly interbellum, attempts to unite the Kingdom or Republic of Hungary with the Kingdom of Romania. Such proposals were most active in 1919 and 1920, though they had appeared somewhat earlier and continued up to World War II.

== Proposals ==
The proposed union would have been ruled by the Romanian Hohenzollern-Sigmaringen dynasty. The project saw support and opposition on both the Romanian and Hungarian sides.

Reasons for Romania to favor the project included potential expansion of Romania's influence nearer to Vienna, increased security of Romania's western border, reduced chances of Hungary taking Transylvania back from Romania and prevention of the Habsburgs returning to power in Hungary.

Hungary's reasons to favor the proposed union were prevention of Hungary's political isolation and Hungarian hopes for getting back Transylvania, or at least securing autonomy for Transylvania's Hungarian minority. As an inducement for Hungary to accept the proposed union, Romania offered to support Hungary in defending its western territories against Austria, and to help Hungary get back Slovakia and Hungary's former southern territories.

Every proposal for union failed because of opposition in Hungary and Romania, as well as opposition from other countries, particularly Serbia and later Yugoslavia, Czechoslovakia and the Entente powers.

== See also ==
- Hungary–Romania relations
- List of proposed state mergers
- Transylvanianism
- Union of Bulgaria and Romania
- Union of Hungary and Poland
