= Lajos Martin =

Hungarian mathematician and engineer

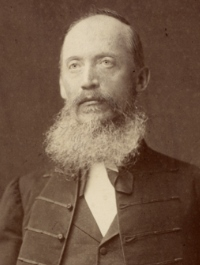
- Born: 30 August 1827; Buda, Kingdom of Hungary (now Budapest, Hungary)
- Died: 4 March 1897 (aged 69); Kolozsvár, Austria-Hungary (now Cluj-Napoca, Romania)
- Resting place: Hajongard cemetery, (Cluj-Napoca); 46.764522°N 23.593152°E
- Education: University of Pest
- Scientific career
- Fields: Mathematics; Engineering
- Workplaces: Franz Joseph University

Lajos Martin (30 August 1827 – 4 March 1897) was a Hungarian mathematician and engineer, known by his works in transportation and aerodynamics.

== Life and work ==
He was the seventh son of a wine grower. After completing his studies in the Roman Catholic Secondary School, he began studies in the University of Pest. The 1848 European revolutions disrupted his studies and due his active participation was imprisoned and after enrolled in the Imperial Army. Finally, he finished his studies graduating in 1854 in the Military Engineering Academy in Vienna.

He was teaching in the Vienna's Military School until 1859 when he left the army and returned to Buda where he worked privately as civil engineer until 1861. From 1863 to 1868 he was teaching at secondary schools in Selmecbánya and Pressburg and he wrote some textbooks on mathematics in this level.

In 1872 he was appointed professor of mathematics in the university of Kolozsvár. He became rector of the university in 1895–1896 and in his inaugural discourse he spoke about the importance of flights in the transportation of people and goods.

He began his research in ballistics in the army, and he followed his theoretical and experimental works in this area all his life. He became also interested in hydraulics and in the search of the most efficient propeller. In his last years he worked in aerodynamics and he had a very clear idea about aviation would be in the future.

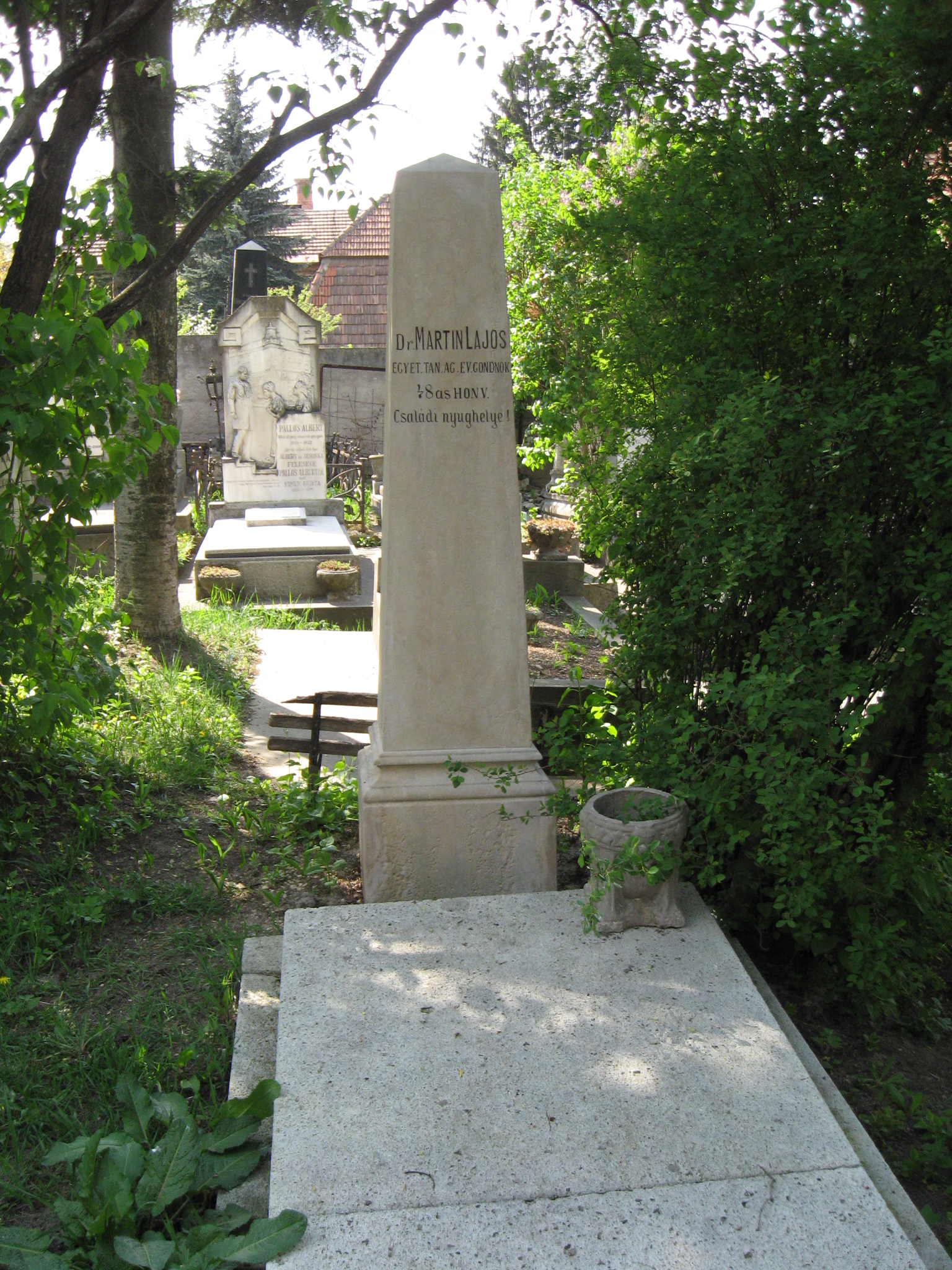
Burial place in Hazsongard Cemetery

== Bibliography ==
- Bitay, Enikő; Máté, Márton (2013). "Martin Lajos a Feltaláló Mérnök és Lebegökerke". XVIII. International Scientific Conference of Young Engineers (in Hungarian): 77–82.
- Hargittai, István; Hargittai, Magdolna (2015). Budapest Scientific: A Guidebook. Oxford University Press. ISBN 978-0-19-871907-6.
- Szénássy, Barna; Bognár, János (1992). History of Mathematics in Hungary Until the 20th Century. Springer. pp. 338–339. ISBN 9783540554974.
- Szenkovits, Ferenc (2014). "Remarkable Hungarian mathematicians at the Cluj University" (PDF). Studia Universitatis Babeş-Bolyai, Mathematica. 59 (4): 419–433. ISSN 2065-961X. Archived from the original (PDF) on 2020-07-19.
