= Aureliu Manea =

Romanian theater director

Aureliu Manea (4 February 1945, Bucharest – 13 March 2014, Galda de Jos) was a Romanian theatre director, actor, and writer.

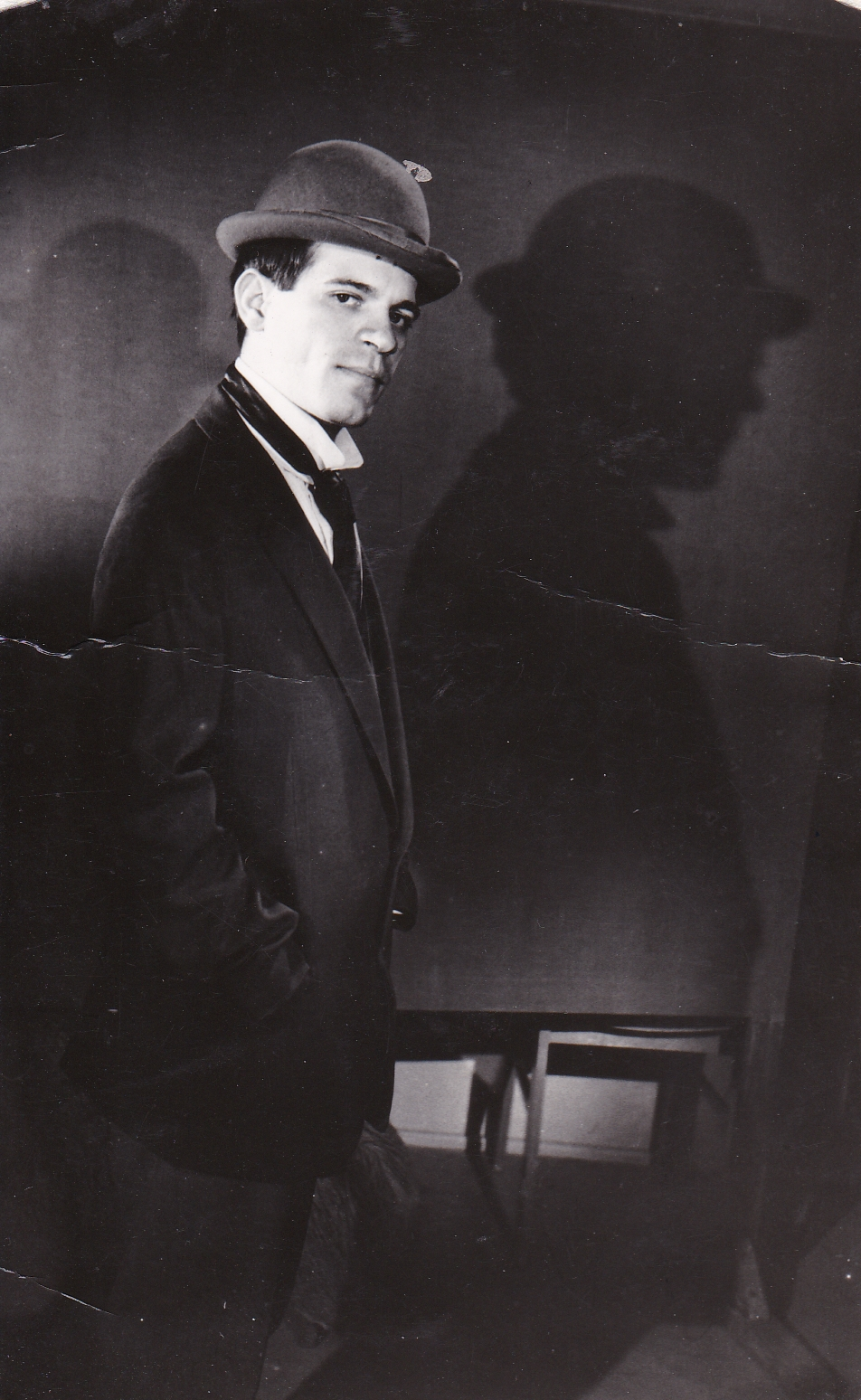
Aureliu Manea, c. 1968

== Life ==
Aureliu Manea studied theatre directing under Radu Penciulescu (1930–2019) at the Caragiale National University of Theatre and Film in Bucharest, graduating in 1968. The same year, he made his debut as a director with a highly original production of Henrik Ibsen's Rosmersholm at the State Theatre of Sibiu.

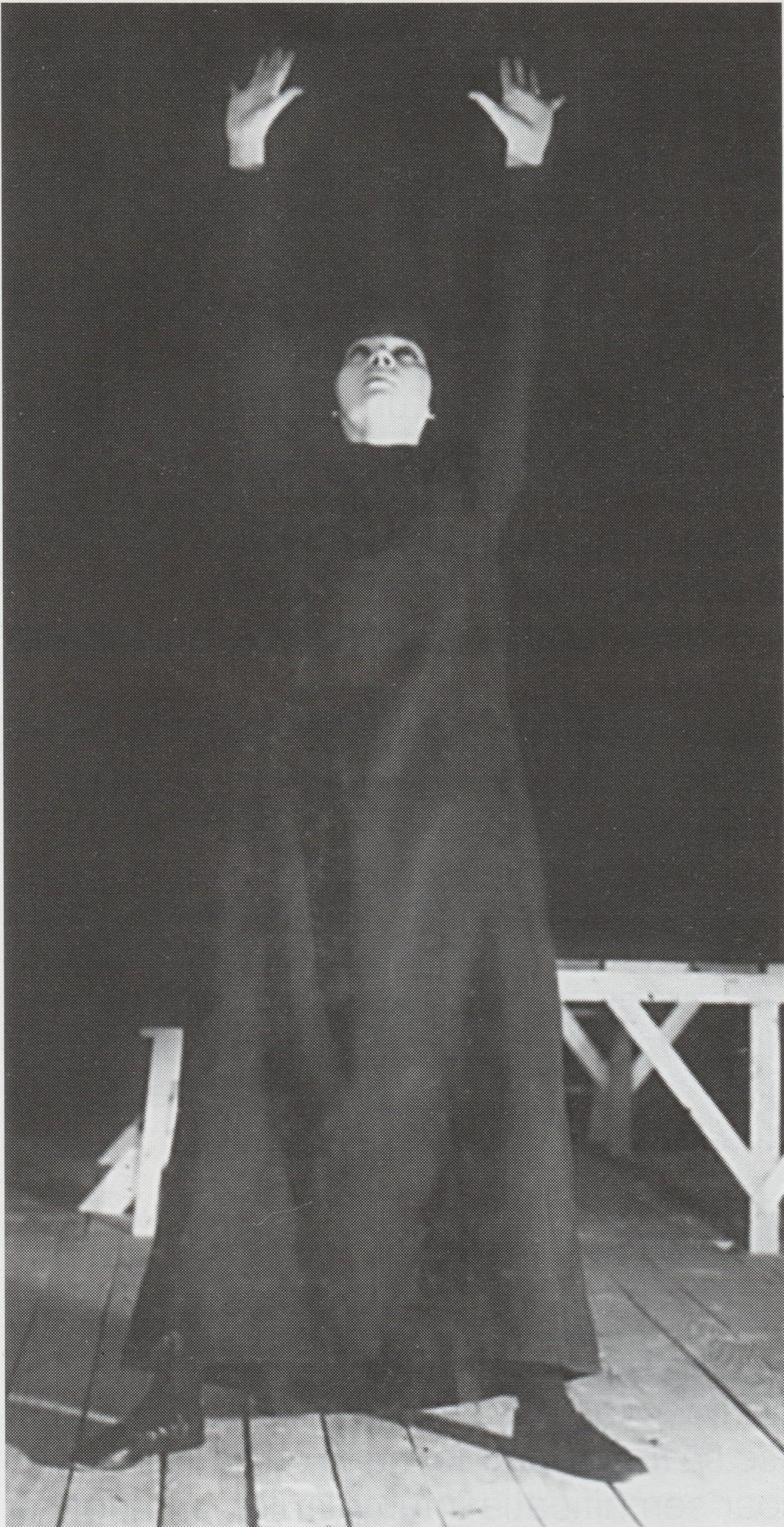
Ibsen, Rosmersholm, dir. Aureliu Manea, 1968

He went on to stage a large number of productions, including works by Shakespeare, Sophocles, Seneca, Chekhov, Arnold Wesker, Jean Racine, Jean Cocteau, and Georg Büchner, as well as Romanian classics, such as Ion Luca Caragiale's A Stormy Night and Tudor Mușatescu's Titanic Waltz, and plays by contemporary Romanian dramatist Teodor Mazilu (1930–1980). Suffering from ill health, Manea withdrew from theatre life in 1991 and was a patient at the Neuropsychiatric Recuperation and Rehabilitation Centre, Galda de Jos, Alba County, until his death in 2014. He is buried at the Hajongard Cemetery in Cluj-Napoca.

In 1993, he was awarded the UNITER (Uniunea Teatrală din România) Prize for Lifetime Achievement. In 2014, the Turda Municipal Theatre was renamed the Aureliu Manea National Theatre in honour of the director, who staged many of his productions there.

== Work as a director ==
Franco-Romanian theatre critic Georges Banu likens Manea to Argentinian director "maudit" Victor Garcia, an exponent of "absolute theatre, incandescent theatre," whose genius was recognised and admired at the time by Jean Genet and Peter Brook. Banu followed Manea's career from the very beginning, writing a review of his debut production, Rosmersholm, staged at the State Theatre of Sibiu in 1968. According to Banu, Manea's production succeeded in creating an intense sense of unease in both cast and audience by embodying Ibsen as a ghostly presence moving among the actors on stage. Similarly, Pastor Rosmer's wife, who commits suicide before the play begins, is present during the performance as a ghostly figure hovering above the stage, as if directing and influencing the actors' actions. In The Energies of Performance, Manea recounts that his reading of Rosmersholm was as a drama that went against nature and life, which prompted him to have the cast appear dressed all in black sackcloth. The only moment relieving the blackness came in Pastor Rosmer's monologue, which the actor spoke while biting the cloth of a white flag, with the resultant tortured delivery conveying how the character's rage for purity had become his own torture. Around this time, Manea staged a production in Timișoara of angry young man Arnold Wesker's Four Seasons, in which he tried to convey the idea of a "failed construction", with lead actors Ovidiu-Iuliu Moldovan and Florin Cercel interrupting their performance to sit down on the stage to rest for two minutes whenever the dramatic situation became false, ridiculous, or unrealistic. Wesker saw the production when it was staged in Bucharest and enjoyed it, but felt it was a performance of someone else's play.

The year before Rosmersholm, in 1967, Manea had been due to stage a production of Sophocles' Philoctetes at the Iași National Theatre, but the premiere was suspended for three years after Teofil Vâlcu, in the lead role, seriously injured himself in a fall from a rope he was climbing onstage during rehearsals. The production featured an Elizabethan-style set intended to convey an aesthetic of brutal, bloody acts that are inherent to an ineluctably violent history and costumes designed to suggest both savagery and a technologically advanced civilisation. After Rosmersholm, Manea continued to stage innovative, visually arresting productions at theatres around Romania, His production of Racine's Britannicus at the Piatra Neamț Youth Theatre in 1969 featured scenes of highly aestheticised, ritualistic torture, which director Liviu Ciulei likened to Japanese Noh theatre, although Manea was unfamiliar with this tradition at the time.

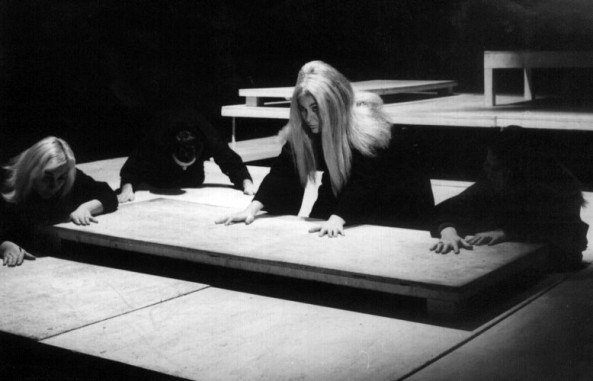
Racine, Britannicus, directed by Aureliu Manea, Youth Theatre, Piatra Neamț, 1969

In 1972, Manea staged a production of Jean Cocteau's The Typewriter at the State Theatre, Turda, which employed as its visual metaphor B movies and the blurring of cinema and real life, with Solange portrayed as a narcissist who steps onto the stage from a white screen at the beginning of the performance and acts out the final suicide scene as if she were on the big screen. In Manea's 1973 production of Marivaux's Le Jeu de l'amour et du hasard at the National Theatre, Cluj, he imagined the action as a game presided over by Orgon as both master of ceremonies and ideal audience, in which the action is a dialogue between costumes rather than characters.

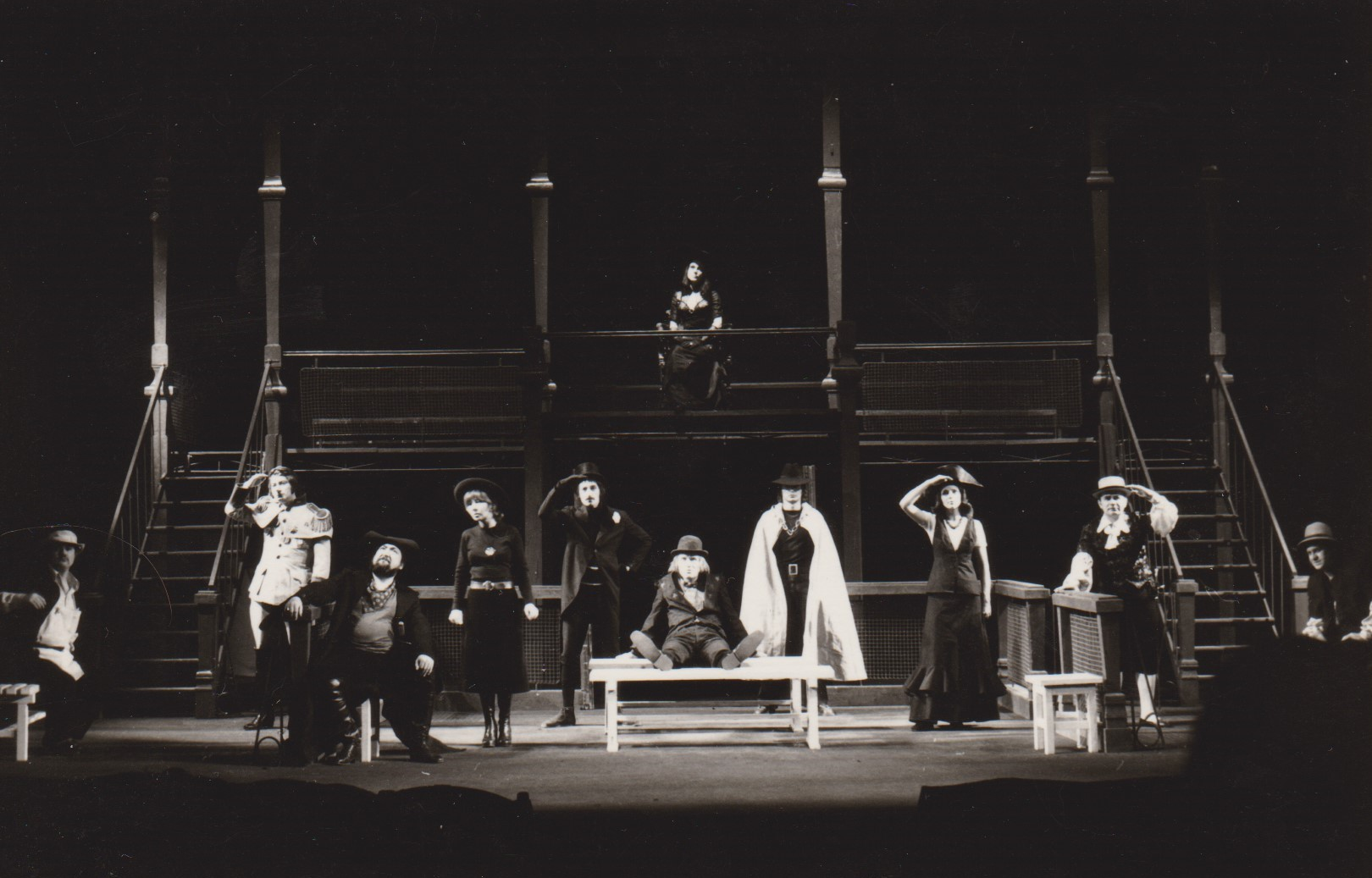
Twelfth Night, directed by Aureliu Manea, Cluj National Theatre, 1975

In 1975, Manea's production of Twelfth Night, which he conceived in the manner of what he called a "philosophical variety show", staged at the Cluj National Theatre, with sets by Paul Salzberger, drew standing ovations. The following year, hisMacbeth, staged at the Ploiești Theatre in 1976, drew on Japanese Kabuki theatre, with a stark set that evoked a desolate, snowy landscape, dominated by a wooden throne symbolising Macbeth's barbarous, brutal power, "adorned with furs and animal heads, which were trophies of earlier conquests and omens of the death that was to come." A contemporary reviewer saw the production as a "cosmic" clash "between Good and Evil, between Life and Death, between order and chaos, or between nature and the human being as a representative of social convulsion."

During his career, Manea staged only one production in Bucharest, however, since he saw the actors there as "too big" and preferred to work with lesser-known actors, who were not given to displays of ego and did not contest his direction: As a director, he saw theatre not as a vehicle for individual actors, but rather as the "art of solidarity", "a ritual of togetherness" uniting actors and audience. Produced by Manea's sister, Viorica Samson, the production in question, for which Manea came out of retirement after two decades in the Galda de Jos Neuropsychiatric Recuperation Home, was a dramatisation of the letters of Mariana Alcoforado, staged at the Metropolis Theatre, Bucharest, with sets by Paul Salzberger.

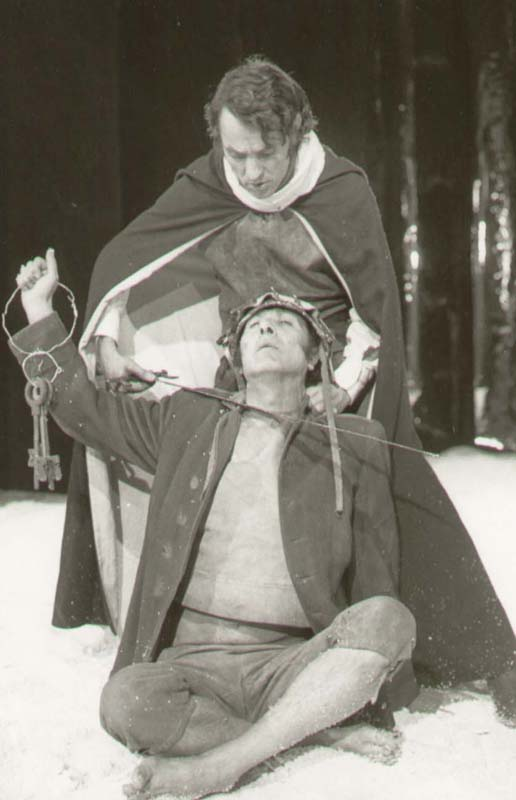
Constantin Drăgănescu and Aristide Teica in Aureliu Manea's production of Macbeth, Ploiești State Theatre, 1976

== List of productions ==
- 1967
- Sophocles, Philoctetes, National Theatre, Iași
- 1968
- Ibsen, Rosmersholm, State Theatre, Sibiu
- 1969
- Arnold Wesker, Four Seasons, National Theatre, Timișoara
- Racine, Britannicus, Youth Theatre, Piatra Neamț
- 1970
- Dumitru Radu Popescu, These Sad Angels, National Theatre Timișoara
- 1971
- Murray Schisgal, The Tiger, Municipal Theatre, Turda
- Valentin Katayev, Squaring the Circle, Municipal Theatre, Turda
- 1972
- Alexandru Kirițescu, The Jays, Municipal Theatre, Turda
- Jean Cocteau, The Typewriter, Municipal Theatre, Turda
- 1973
- Marivaux, The Game of Love and Chance, National Theatre, Cluj
- 1975
- Shakespeare, Twelfth Night, National Theatre, Cluj
- Ion Luca Caragiale, A Stormy Night, National Theatre, Cluj
- 1976
- Shakespeare, Macbeth, Municipal Theatre, Ploiești
- Aristophanes, Peace, National Theatre, Cluj
- 1977
- Valentin Munteanu, The Water Level of the Danube, Municipal Theatre, Turda
- 1978
- Arden of Faversham, Municipal Theatre, Ploiești
- Racine, Phèdre, State Theatre, Sibiu
- Ion Luca Caragiale, Conul Leonida față cu reacțiunea, National Theatre, Cluj
- 1979
- Carlo Goldoni, The Mistress of the Inn, National Theatre, Cluj
- August Strindberg, Miss Julia, Municipal Theatre, Turda
- Tudor Mușatescu, Titanic Waltz, Hungarian State Theatre, Cluj
- 1980
- Teodor Mazilu, These Hypocritical Fools, Hungarian State Theatre, Cluj
- Euripides, Medea, Municipal Theatre, Turda
- 1981
- Molière, Tartuffe, National Theatre, Cluj
- Goethe, Iphigenie in Tauris, Municipal Theatre, Petroșani
- 1982
- Teodor Mazilu, Somnoroasa aventură, National Theatre, Timișoara
- 1983
- Horia Lovinescu, The Boga Sisters, National Theatre, Cluj
- 1984
- Barbu Ștefănescu-Delavrancea, The Second Conscience, National Theatre, Cluj
- Mircea Vaida, Execuția se repetă, National Theatre, Cluj
- 1986
- Teodor Mazilu, Fools by Moonlight, National Theatre, Cluj
- 1988
- Anton Chekhov, Three Sisters, National Theatre, Cluj
- 1989
- I.D. Sîrbu, The Ark of Good Hope, National Theatre, Craiova
- 1990
- Georg Büchner, Woyzeck, Municipal Theatre, Ploiești
- 2012
- The Portuguese Letters of Mariana Alcoforado, Metropolis Theatre, Bucharest

== Writing ==
In 1983, Manea published Energiile spectacolului (The Energies of Performance), a series of short meditations on directors (Liviu Ciulei, Jerzy Grotowski, Peter Brook) and directing; playwrights (Sophocles, Gogol, Shakespeare, Aristophanes, Racine, Strindberg, Carlo Goldoni, Brecht, Chekhov, Molière, Marivaux); actors and acting; the ritual and psychological laws governing stage properties; the mechanisms of attention during performance (the director is an "engineer of attention"); theatre as officiation of a sacral rite; directorial intention, improvisation, chance, and the "entropic phenomenon" in theatrical performance; and the fundamental enigma and ephemerality of the theatrical act. In Spectacole imaginare, published in 1986, Manea takes nineteen plays by Shakespeare (Richard II, The Merchant of Venice, The Tempest, As You Like It, Two Gentlemen of Verona, Julius Caesar, Much Ado About Nothing, The Comedy of Errors, Love's Labours Lost, A Midsummer Night's Dream, Romeo and Juliet, King John, Richard III, The Taming of the Shrew, Titus Andronicus, Twelfth Night, Othello, Macbeth, Hamlet) and imagines a production that might penetrate the enigma of each play, its timeless human mystery. The "Imaginary Performances" are followed by a series of "Confessions", in which Manea meditates on his work as a director, on his past productions and work with specific actors and playwrights, on the puppet theatre, on performance as a ritual of profound communion between audience and actors, on the giants of universal drama (Aeschylus, Goethe).

In 2012, Viorica Samson Manea, the director's sister, edited and published a collection of Manea's writings: the trilogy of plays Penelope Falls to Thinking, The Theatre Rehearsal, and The Fairy from the East, short stories, and an essay ("Man's Solitude, or Narcissus"). Penelope Falls to Thinking was presented in the Reading Performances section of the Sibiu International Theatre Festival in 2012. In 2013, the Cluj National Theatre staged a production of Manea's trilogy of plays, directed by Gábor Tompa.

== Sources ==
- Georges Banu, "Un meteorit." In Manea (2012, 5–10)
- Monica Matei-Chesnoiu, Shakespeare in the Romanian Cultural Memory, Fairleigh Dickinson University Press, Madison, Teaneck, 2006 ISBN 0-8386-4081-8.
- Aureliu Manea, Energiile spectacolului, Editura Dacia, Cluj, Socialist Republic of Romania, 1983.
- Aureliu Manea, Imaginary Performances in Shakespeare, trans. Alistair Ian Blyth, Routledge, Taylor & Francis Group, 2020 ISBN 978-0367498740.
- Aureliu Manea, Texte regăsite, ed. Viorica Samson Manea, Casa Cărții de Știință, Cluj, 2012 ISBN 978-606-17-0124-7.
- Aureliu Manea, Spectacole imaginare, 2nd edition, Editura Eikon, Bucharest, 2018 ISBN 978-606-711-801-8.
- Ștefan Oprea, "Cazul Filoctet", Cronica Veche, No. 3 (62), March 2016.
- Nicolae Prelipceanu, "Teatrul Globus al lui Aureliu Manea." In Manea (2018, 13–16)
- Paul Salzberger, "Creion." In Manea (2012, 11–12)
- Viorica Samson Manea, "Foreword." In Manea (2020, xi-xii)
- Sibiu International Theatre Festival 2012, Antologia, ed. Alina Mazilu, Editura Humanitas, Bucharest, 2012 ISBN 978-973-50-3627-0.
