= Antonine de Gérando =

French-born Hungarian writer (1844–1914)

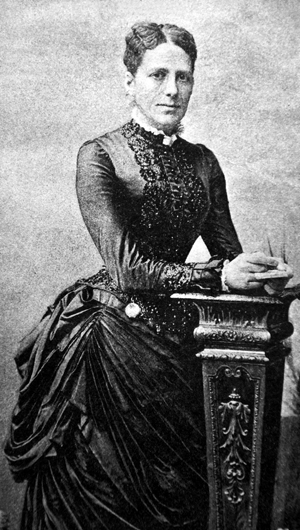
- Born: February 13, 1844 Paris, France
- Died: April 9, 1914 (aged 70) Kolozsvár, Hungary
- Occupation: translator, non-fiction writer, educator
- Language: French, Hungarian
- Relatives: Auguste de Gérando (father); Hungarian Countess Teleki Emma (mother); Blanka Teleki aunt

Antonine de Gérando (also known as Antonina de Gérando Teleki; 13 February 1844–9 April 1914) was a French-born Hungarian translator, non-fiction writer, and educator.

== Biography ==
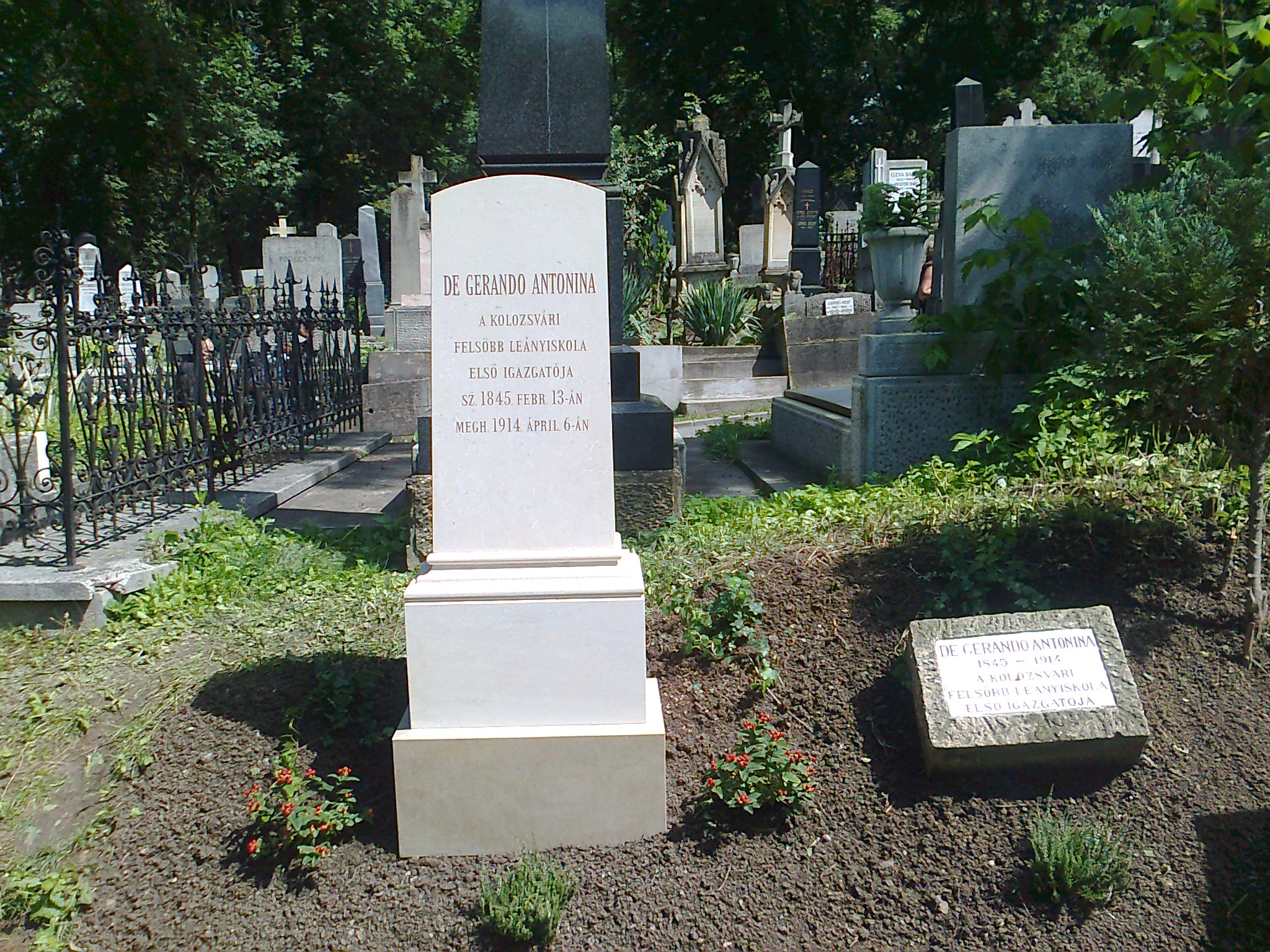
Gerando's grave at Hajongard cemetery

Antonine (or Antonina) de Gérando was born in Paris on February 13, 1844. Her parents were the liberal historian and writer Auguste de Gérando and the Hungarian Countess Teleki Emma, niece of the educator and feminist Blanka Teleki.

Gérando completed her education in Paris, where she obtained a secondary school diploma. Her parents hosted prominent figures such as Jules Michelet; these encounters had a profound influence on her.

From 1872 onwards, she lived in Hungary, where she taught at the Women's Association Institute, at a manual industrial school, and within elite families[3]. She served as the head of the girls' secondary school in Kolozsvár until 1912. In 1880, she translated Mór Jókai's novel A kőszívű ember fiai (The Sons of the Man with the Heart of Stone) into French.

Gérando published articles in various newspapers and journals, notably Paedogogia, Opposition, Journal de Dimanche, Revue internationale de l'enseignement, and La revue pédagogique.

She retired from her position as school principal in 1912.

Antonine de Gérando died on April 9, 1914, in Kolozsvár. She was buried at Hajongard cemetery.

== Selected works ==
=== Books ===
- Stein János, ed. (1880). Nőtan, vagy az asszonyi hivatás tudománya [Gynecology, or the science of women's professions] (in Hungarian). Kolozsvár.
- Nyomatott Stein János, ed. (1881). Neveléstan [Education] (in Hungarian). Kolozsvár.
- Légrády Testvérek, ed. (1883). Háztartástan vagy A nő legszükségesebb életismereteinek rövid előadása [Home Economics or a Short Lecture on the Most Necessary Life Skills of a Woman] (in Hungarian). Budapest.
- Kiadja Stampfel Károly, ed. (1896). Franczia olvasókőnyv a magyarországi felsőbb leány-iskolák II., III. és IV. osztályai számára - Livre de lecture à l'usage de la II., III. et IV. classe des écoles supérieures de jeunes filles en Hongrie [French reading book for the II., III. and IV. classes of girls' high schools in Hungary - Livre de lecture à l'usage de la II., III. et IV. classe des écoles supérieures de jeunes filles en Hongrie] (in Hungarian). Budapest.
- Ajtai K. Albert Könyvnyomdája, ed. (1896). Reform javaslatok a felsőbb leányiskolákra nézve [Reform proposals for girls' high schools] (in Hungarian). Kolozsvárt.

=== Articles ===
- "L'Instruction publique en Angleterre, par le Dr. Louis Felmeri. Pesth, 1881" [Public Education in England, by Dr. Louis Felmeri. Pesth, 1881]. Revue internationale de l'enseignement. 2 (2): 492–94. 1881.
- Gerando, Antonina de (1892). "A propos des distributions de prix" [About prize-giving ceremonies]. Revue pédagogique (in French). 20 (1): 428–30.

=== Translations from Hungarian into French ===
- Jókai, Mór (1880). P. Ollendorff (ed.). Les fils de l'homme au cœur de pierre [The sons of the man with a heart of stone] (in French). Paris. (text, via Internet Archive)

== Sources ==
- Schkolnyk, Claude (1995). "Exilés et voyageurs en Hongrie" [Exiles and Travelers in Hungary]. Revue d'histoire du XIXe siècle (in French). 11 (1): 51–63.
