= Antonín Carvan =

Czechoslovak footballer (1991–1959)

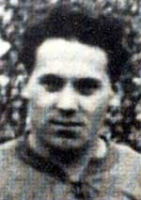

Personal information
- Date of birth: May 15, 1901
- Place of birth: Kročehlavy, Austria-Hungary
- Date of death: November 1, 1959 (aged 58)
- Place of death: Czechoslovakia
- Position: Midfielder

Youth career
- SK Kročehlavy

Senior career*
Years	Team	Apps	(Gls)
1918–1924	SK Židenice		
1924–1926	Viktoria Žižkov		
1926–1930	AC Sparta Prague		
1930–1932	SK Náchod		
1932–1934	SC Nîmes		

International career
1924–1930	Czechoslovakia	14	(0)

Managerial career
- 1935–1936: SK Židenice
- 1937–1938: SK Židenice
- * Club domestic league appearances and goals

Antonín Carvan (15 May 1901 – 1 November 1959) was a Czechoslovak former footballer who played as a midfielder. He played 14 games for the Czechoslovakia national football team. Carvan made 89 appearances in the Czechoslovak First League, scoring 13 times. He later managed SK Židenice at the same level.
