= Antonine Meunier =

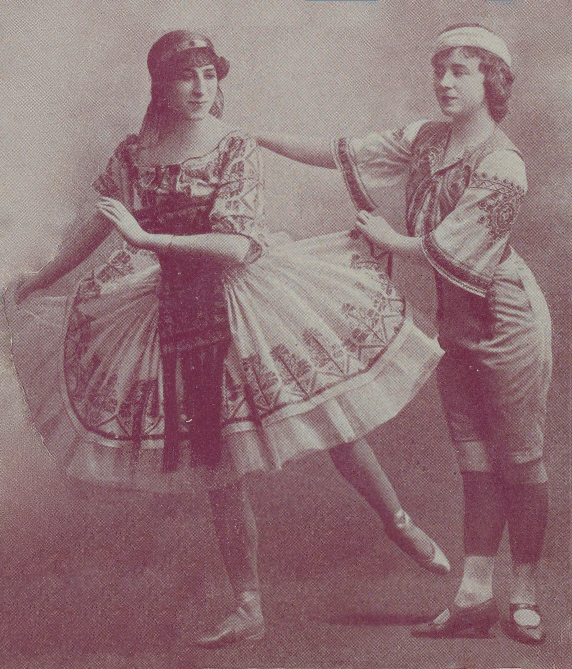
Carlotta Zambelli and Meunier (right) in Les Deux Pigeon

Antonine Meunier (9 August 1877 – 12 March 1972) was a French ballet dancer, teacher and writer.

Meunier studied at the Dance School of the Paris Opera. Later she joined the Paris Opera Ballet and became principal dancer . She was the partner of Carlotta Zambelli in Les Deux Pigeons by André Messager.

After leaving the Opera in 1923 Meunier taught dance at the Conservatoire Populaire Mimi Pinson which was founded by Gustave Charpentier. She was professor at the conservatory from 1900 to 1926.

She wrote several books on ballet and choreography and she created a dance notation published in 1931 under the title Figures. Sténochorégraphie – Dictionnaire. She wrote the highly regarded and influential La danse classique which was published in 1932.

In recognition of her services to the Théâtre aux Armées, a theatrical troupe which entertained French soldiers during the World War I, and dedication to the Académie de musique et de danse, in July 1932 she was awarded the cross of the Legion of Honour .

A fund at the library of the Centre National de la Danse which archives works by journalist and dance critic Gilberte Cournand bears her name.
