= Antonín Mikala =

Czech fencer

Personal information
- Born: 28 February 1874

Sport
- Sport: Fencing

Antonín Mikala was a Czech foil and sabre fencer. He competed in three events at the 1920 Summer Olympics.
