= Antonín Byczanski =

Czech sport shooter

Personal information
- Born: 1887

Sport
- Country: Czechoslovakia
- Sport: Sport shooting

Antonín Byczanski (1887–?) was a Czech sport shooter. He competed for Czechoslovakia in two events at the 1924 Summer Olympics.
