= Antonin Perbòsc =

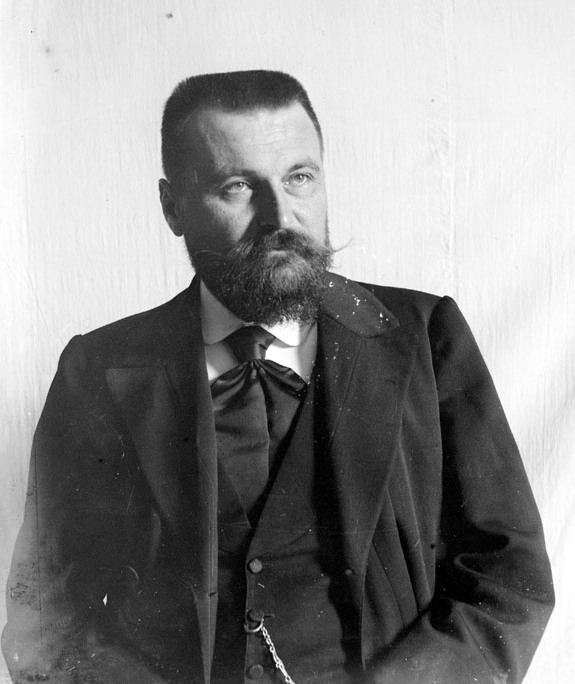
Antonin Perbòsc.

Antonin Perbòsc was a poet from Occitania, France. He was born in Labarthe, Tarn-et-Garonne in 1861 and died in 1944 in Montauban. His first job was as a primary school teacher in Comberouger, a small town 30km off Montauban, and later in Loze, near Villefranche-de-Rouergue. He'd teach his pupils about the region's traditions and cultural heritage and even formed a society for the more eager among them. The so-called societat tradicionista gathered 51 schoolgoers, both male and female, between 1900 and 1908.

The members of this club had a mission of collecting the oral patrimony around them, in other words all the Occitan songs, sayings, proverbs and tales they could come across where they lived. They'd then write them down without changing a single word. The younger pupils, who couldn't write yet, would tell what they heard and their older schoolmates would do the writing part for them. Perbòsc's innovative work was noted by folk specialists at the 1900 Congrès des traditions populaires in Paris. The tales told by the children were phonetically transcribed so as to respect the local accents and intonations, which still gave rise to tensions both with Provençal and Gascon activists who had their own views on how to better spell Occitan. These works can no longer be found.

Perbòsc also wrote poems, in magnificent style, which inspiration for he found in popular traditions.

== Works ==
- Remembransas (Memories) (1902)
- Lo got occitan (The Occitan Glass) (1903)
- "Fòc nòu" (New Fire), Mont-Segur (1904), 2nd edition (2011)
- L'arada (The Field) (1906)
- Guilhem de Toloza (Guilhem of Toulouse) (1908)
- Lo libre dels ausèls (The Book of Birds) (1924)
- Psophos (1925)
- Les langues de France à l’école (The Languages of France at School), a study (1926)
- Segond libre dels ausèls (The Second Book of Birds) (1930)
- Fablèls (The Fable Books) (1936)
- Lo libre del campèstre (The Country Book)
- Contes Atal (Tales Like These) (2007)
