= Jenő Dsida =

Hungarian poet and translator

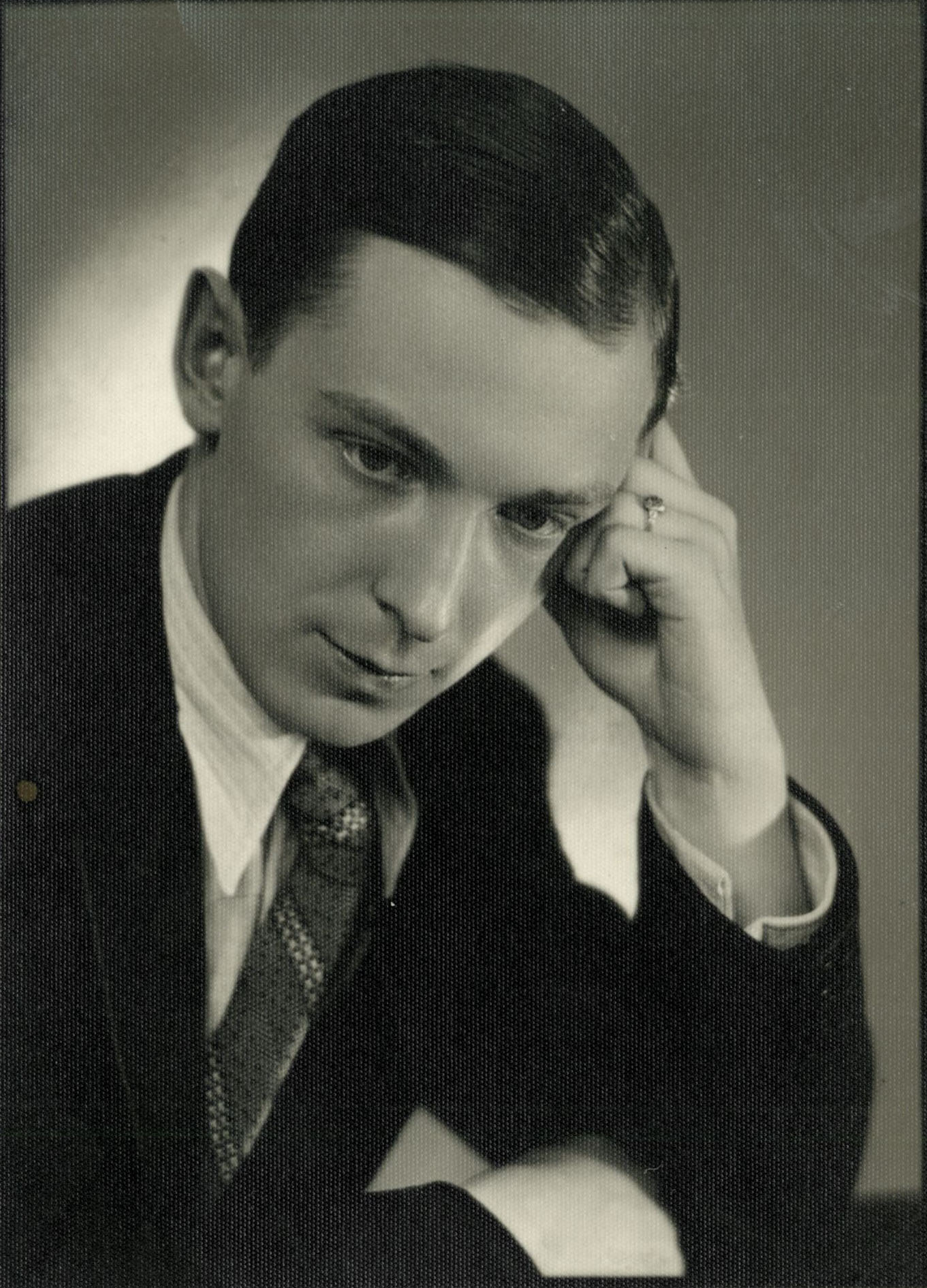
- Born: Binder Jenő Emil; 17 May 1907; Szatmárnémeti, Austria-Hungary (today Satu Mare, Romania)
- Died: 7 June 1938 (aged 31); Cluj, Romania
- Resting place: Hajongard Cemetery, Cluj, Romania
- Occupation: poet
- Spouse: Melinda Imbery
- Writing career
- Language: Hungarian
- Period: 1923–1938

Jenő Dsida (Hungarian: Dsida Jenő, pronounced [ˈd͡ʒidɒ ˈjɛnøː]; 17 May 1907 – 7 June 1938) was a Hungarian poet and translator.

== Early life ==
Jenő Dsida was born in 1907, in Transylvania. His father - Aladár Dsida - was an engineering officer in the Common Army of the Austro-Hungarian Empire. His mother, Margit Csengeri Tóth lived in Beregszász and that is where she met and married her husband.

Jenő's childhood was shadowed by World War I and after that by the Romanian occupation. During the war, his father was captured by the Russians, while his uncle was killed in Galicia.

He wanted to be a poet from the very beginning of his youth. He was discovered and helped by Elek Benedek. From 1923 to 1927 his first poems and literary translations were published in the magazine Cimbora. In 1925, in cause of his parents' will, he studied law at the Franz Joseph University, but he never graduated.

In 1937, he married the love of his life Melinda Imbery.

== Death ==
Dsida suffered from heart failure and in 1938, he got cold. Therefore, he was hospitalized for months in Kolozsvár, but unfortunately he died in his sleep at the age of 31.

== Works ==
- Leselkedő magány (1928)
- Nagycsütörtök (1933)
- Angyalok citeráján (1938)
- Jövendő havak himnusza (1923-1927)
- Rettenetes virágének (1928-1938)
- Séta egy csodálatos szigeten (1992)
- Légy már legenda (2005)
- Magyar karaván Itálián keresztül (2006)
