= Antonina =

Antonina may refer to:

== Geography ==
- Antonina, Paraná, a municipality in Brazil
- Antonina, Bełchatów County, in Łódź Voivodeship, central Poland
- Antonina, Pajęczno County, in Łódź Voivodeship, central Poland
- Antonina, Poddębice County, in Łódź Voivodeship, central Poland
- Antonina, Masovian Voivodeship, east-central Poland

== Other uses ==
- Antonina (bug), a genus of mealybugs
- Antonina (name)
- Antonina (wife of Belisarius) (c. 495–after 565), Byzantine patrikia and wife of the general Belisarius
- Antonina (Tur novel), by Evgenia Tur
- Antonina (Collins novel), an 1850 novel by Wilkie Collins
- Antonina Nutshell, Swedish drag queen who competed in Drag Race Sverige

== See also ==
- Antonia (disambiguation)
- Antonine (name)
