= Frédéric-Antonin Breysse =

French cartoonist and illustrator

Frédéric-Antonin Breysse (20 November 1907 – 13 September 2001) was a French cartoonist and illustrator. He was the creator of the comic series The Adventures of Oscar Hamil, published in the weekly Message to the Hearts Valiant and Valiant Hearts between 1945 and 1955.

== Publications ==
- 1947: The Most Beautiful Story, text of Father Gaston Courtois, from collection Beautiful Stories and Beautiful Lives, ed. Fleurus
- 1952: St Francis of Assisi, the text of Father Jean Pihan from collection Beautiful Stories and Beautiful Lives, ed. Fleurus

=== The Adventures of Oscar Hamel and Isidore ===
- 1945: Strange Adventure, reissued in 1996 as Volume 9 of the series
- 1947: The Conquerors of Infinity, reissued in 1982 as Volume 7 of the series
- 1952: The Mystery of Ker-Polik, Oscar Hamel and Isidore T.1
- 1952: Uncle Chad, Oscar Hamel and Isidore T.2
- 1952 S.O.S. 23-75, Oscar Hamel and Isidore T.3
- 1953: The Mountain of Fear, Oscar Hamel and Isidore T.4
- 1954: The river of fire, Oscar Hamel and Isidore T.5
- 1954: The Forgotten City, Oscar Hamel and Isidore T.6
- 1995: The Idol Emerald Eyes, Oscar Hamel and Isidore T.8 ed. du Triomphe
- The mystery of Vultur Totem, an unfinished adventure appearing in Valiant Hearts. Most of these stories have also appeared in this weekly before forthcoming albums.

== Bibliography ==
- 1979: Hop! No. 19, Dossier F.A.Breysse and interview, by Gérard Thomassian
