= Antonin Idrac =

French sculptor

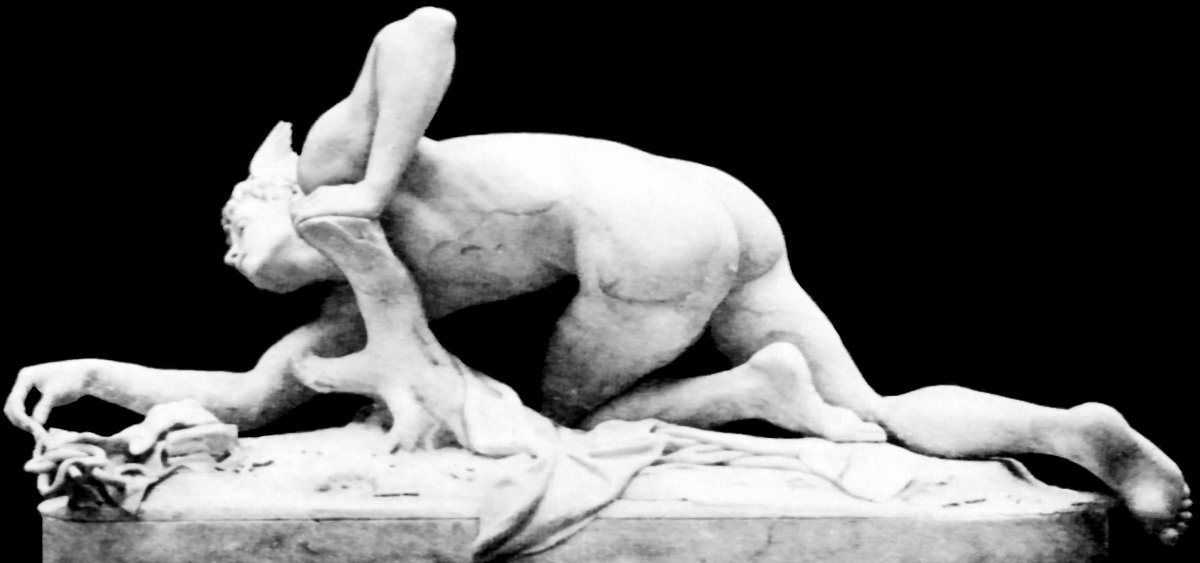
Mercury Inventing the Caduceus, taken from a small 1914 book photo

Jean-Antoine-Marie "Antonin" Idrac (1849–1884) was a French sculptor.

A pupil of Falguière, his works include:

- Salammbô / Eve and the Serpent, based on the novel Salammbô
- Cupid Stung
- Mercury inventing the Caduceus, now in the Musée d'Orsay
- Étienne Marcel, an equestrian statue in Paris.

His work has been cited as an influence on the sculpture of Lord Leighton.
