= Antonín Mlejnský =

Czech footballer (born 1973)

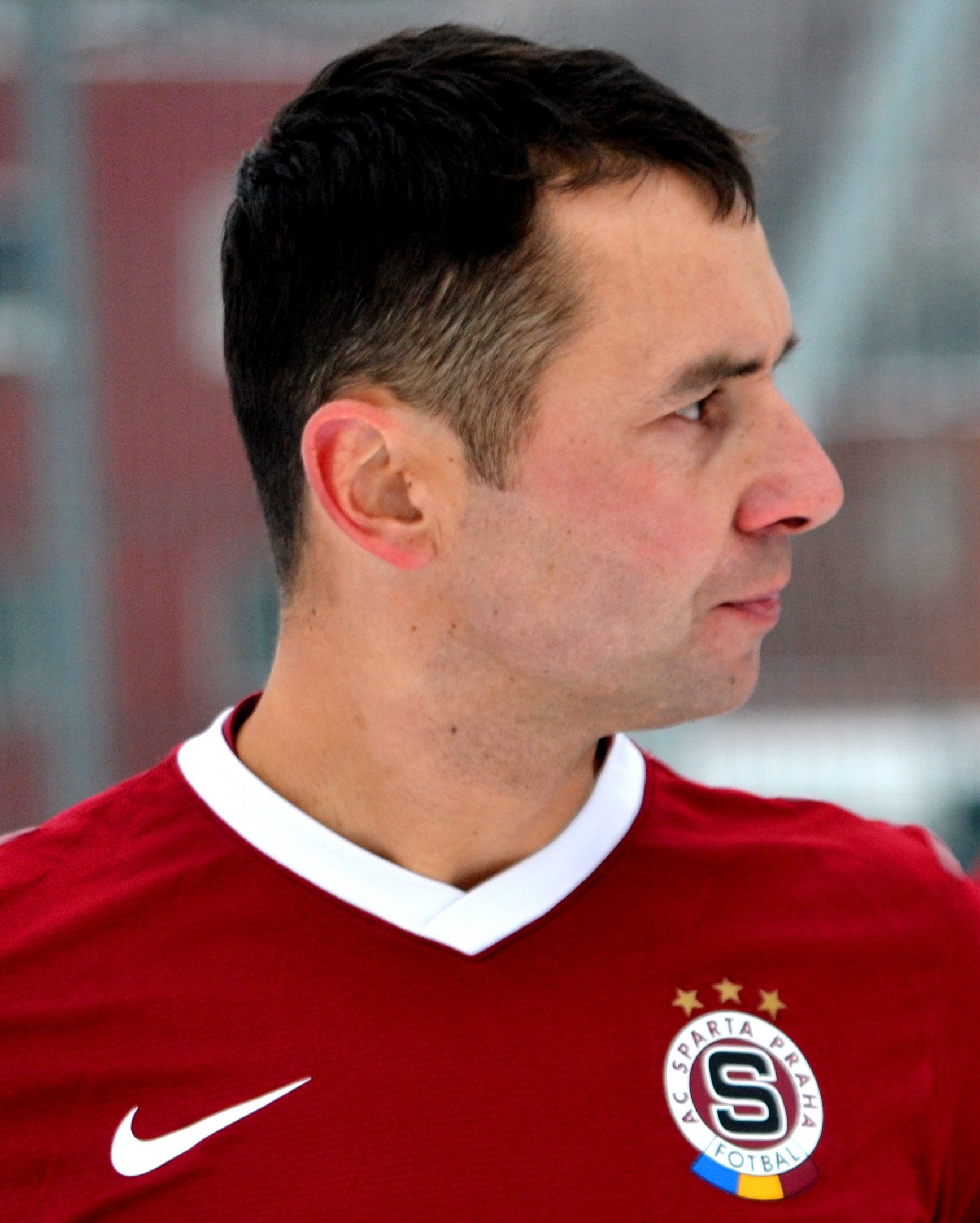

Personal information
- Date of birth: 17 May 1973 (age 53)
- Place of birth: Prague, Czechoslovakia
- Position: Defender

Youth career
- 1980–1991: TJ Davle
- 1991–1993: Okula Nýrsko

Senior career*
Years	Team	Apps	(Gls)
1993–1994	DIOSS Chomutov		
1994	SC Horní Počernice		
1995–1998	Viktoria Žižkov	88	(2)
1998–1999	AC Sparta Prague	18	(1)
1999–2005	Viktoria Žižkov	123	(1)

International career
2002	Czech Republic	1	(0)
- * Club domestic league appearances and goals

Antonín Mlejnský (born 17 May 1973, in Czechoslovakia) is a Czech former football player. He made one international appearance for the Czech Republic national football team and won the 1998–99 Gambrinus liga with AC Sparta Prague.
