= Antonín Molčík =

Czech actor (1939–2014)

- Born: 8 September 1939; Třebíč, Czechoslovakia
- Died: 18 April 2014 (aged 74); Prague, Czech Republic
- Occupation: Actor

Antonín Molčík (8 September 1939 - 18 April 2014) was a Czech actor and voice actor.

Molčík died aged 74 in a hospital in Prague.

He voiced character Ennio Salieri in video game Mafia: The City of Lost Heaven (Czech version).
