= Sándor Reményik =

Hungarian poet

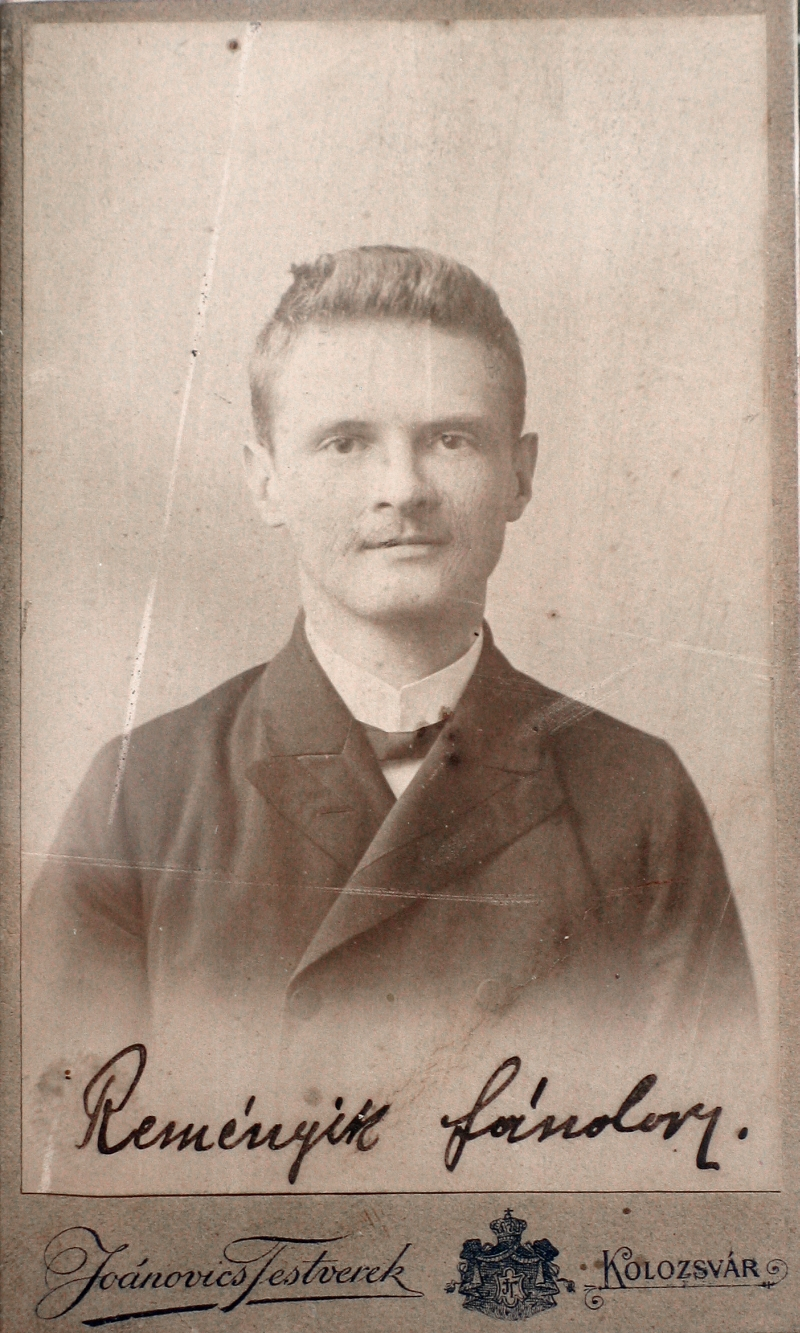
- Sándor Reményik
- Born: Sándor Reményik; August 30, 1890; Kolozsvár, Austria-Hungary (now Cluj-Napoca, Romania)
- Died: October 24, 1941 (aged 51); Kolozsvár, Austria-Hungary (now Cluj-Napoca, Romania)
- Resting place: Házsongárd Cemetery, Cluj-Napoca
- Occupations: Poet, periodical editor
- Writing career
- Years active: 1916–1941
- Notable works: Mindhalálig (1918); Végvári versek 1918–1921 (1921); Gondolatok a költészetről (1926)
- Movements: Transylvanism, Symbolism

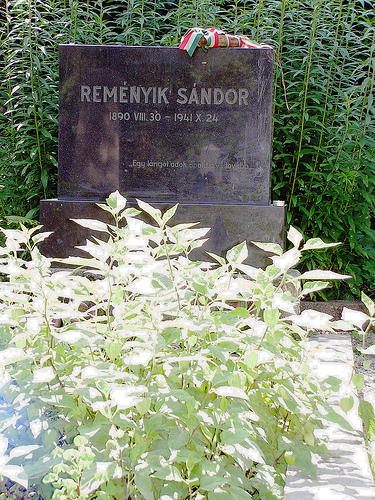
Tombstone at Házsongárd Cemetery

Sándor Reményik (August 30, 1890 – October 24, 1941) was a Hungarian poet and a leading figure of interwar Transylvanian Hungarian lyric poetry. Writing under the pen name Végvári, he received several prestigious literary awards during his lifetime. Following 1945, political considerations led to his work being exiled from Hungarian literature for decades, leaving him relatively unknown in Hungary until recent years.

== Family Background and Lineage ==
Reményik was born in Kolozsvár (now Cluj-Napoca) to Károly Reményik (1857–1935), an architectural engineer, president of the Kolozsvár Craftsmen's Association, and curator of the Lutheran congregation, and Mária Bretz (1863–1930). His paternal grandparents were Lajos Reményik (1812–1906), an iron wholesaler in Kolozsvár born in Dobsina, and Matild Nickl (1830–1912).

The family descended from a noble house from Trencsén County whose nobility was granted and proclaimed on October 20, 1659. The 1703 census of nobility listed the Reményik family living and holding property in Oláhpatak before relocating to nearby Dobsina to the north. His paternal great-grandparents were noble János Reményik (b. 1767) and Mária Gömöry (b. 1777), daughter of György Gömöry (1738–1803), town judge of Dobsina, and Eszter Szojka (1741–1810).

Ancestors of the Gömöry, Nickl, and Szojka families had engaged in mining as free citizens in Dobsina since 1326. The Gömöry family, recorded as early as 1651, served as town judges of Dobsina across centuries and manufactured weapons for Francis II Rákóczi alongside local miners and smelters.

== Early Life and Education ==
After attending Lutheran primary school, Reményik completed his secondary studies at the Reformed Main Gymnasium in Kolozsvár. He went on to study law at the faculty of law at Franz Joseph University in Kolozsvár for four years. An eye disease prevented him from taking his final comprehensive examinations.

During his school and university years, he formed friendships with Lajos Olosz and Sándor Makkai (later a writer and Reformed bishop). The group later collaborated in community-building efforts for the Transylvanian Hungarian minority.

== Literary career ==
Reményik published his first poem in the journal Új Idők in 1916. In 1918, he became a regular contributor to Erdélyi Szemle. In 1921, he became editor-in-chief of Pásztortűz (reorganized from Erdélyi Szemle), leading the periodical through a difficult period while Transylvanian literature coalesced around it.

Supported by his father's estate, Reményik did not take up public office or employment, living on his inheritance and literary pursuits. He considered the poet to be an "architect of souls". His early poetry collections, Mindhalálig (1918) and Végvári versek 1918–1921 (1921), brought him quick popularity.

His lyric style matured in the 1920s, combining Transylvanism with a strong humanist philosophy. His poems feature rich natural imagery, symbolism, philosophical inquiry, and elements of humor. In 1926, he published the theoretical essay Gondolatok a költészetről (Thoughts on Poetry) in Arad, examining the nature of the poetic vocation.

His life and work were driven by his Christian faith and Hungarian heritage, alongside family traditions preserving memories of the 1848 Revolution. His mother was a cultured lover of literature who strongly influenced his artistic temperament.

"Úgy beszéljen ma ki-ki magyarul,

Mintha imádkozna,

Mintha aranyat, tömjént, myrrhát hozna!"

— Sándor Reményik: Ige

== Later Years, Health, and Death ==
Following the Treaty of Trianon, Reményik briefly fell silent before developing a quiet, introspective tone. The loss of his homeland caused severe depression and led to morphine dependence. Suffering physical ailments, he spent extended periods in sanatoriums, and from the mid-1920s felt that the attrition of his community was inevitable.

He was treated with insulin shock therapy, a contemporary psychiatric procedure. He died during a treatment session in Kolozsvár on October 24, 1941, at the age of 51. He was buried from the Lutheran church in Kolozsvár as a national figure. His grave in Házsongárd Cemetery bears the epitaph: "Egy lángot adok, ápold, add tovább" ("I give you a flame, tend it, pass it on").

== Honors and Legacy ==
- Baumgarten Prize: Awarded in 1937 and 1941.
- Corvin Chain: Awarded in 1940.
- Translations: His poetry has been translated into English, Czech, French, Croatian, Polish, German, Italian, Romanian, Swedish, and Slovak.
- Collected Works: His complete poetry was published in two volumes in 2005 by Luther Kiadó, Polis Könyvkiadó, and Kálvin Kiadó.

== Works ==
- Mistletoe (1918)
- Until death (1918)
- Only like that (1920)
- Verses of a border castle (1921)
- Whispers of wild water (1921)
- An idea comes (1925)
- The bells of Atlantis ring (1927)
- Front of the lamp (1927)
- Instead of bread (1932)
- Flower in ruins (1935)
- Snow cross (1937)
- High tension (1940)
- Complete verses (1941)
- Beteljesedés (1942) – Fulfillment (Posthumously published uncollected poems)
