= Louise Antonini =

French female soldier

Jeanne Louise Antonini (30 May 1771 – 26 June 1861) was a French woman who disguised herself as a male to join the French Navy during the Revolutionary period and the Napoleonic Wars. After serving 10 years in the navy, she joined the French Army for the next 15 years, where she reached the rank of sergeant.

== Biography ==
Jeanne Louise Antonini was born to Pierre Jean Antonini and Louise Le Boucle in Ajaccio, the capital of Corsica. Both of her parents were involved in the freedom movement of Corsica after the French conquest of Corsica and were followers of Pasquale Paoli. Antonini had two older siblings. Her older sister entered a convent and her brother died at sea. Her father died and her mother met an unknown fate resulting in Antonini being an orphan by age ten.

She joined the crew of the frigate La Cornélie soon afterwards posing as a boy. She was able to conceal her true identity. After 10 years, in 1804, she was captured and wounded near Îles des Saintes, during an action with the British Navy after the frigate had left the port of Santo Domingo. As a prisoner, she was interned on a pontoon off the coast of Plymouth, England for eighteen months. Following the signing of a treaty between the British and French, she was allowed to return to France. There she joined the French Army, with the 70th of Line. She was still disguised as a male. Over the next 15 years, she was able to rise in rank to corporal and to sergeant. While in Portugal during the French occupation, she was wounded severely, including major injuries to her head. Over the course of her service, she received nine wounds.

After leaving the military, she worked for about 20 years in a brick factory in Brest. At the age of 70, she was presented with a Saint Helena Medal by Marshal Baraguey d'Hilliers. Antonini died on 26 June 1861 in Nantes at the age of 90. A street in Nantes bears her name.
