= Antonín Klimek =

Czech historian (1937–2005)

Antonín Klimek (January 18, 1937 – January 9, 2005) was a Czech historian from Prague whose work focused mainly on the history of the First Czechoslovak Republic.

== Books ==
- 1989 – Diplomacie na křižovatce Evropy
- 1989 – Jak se dělal mír roku 1919
- 1995 – Československá zahraniční politika 1918–1938 (together with Eduard Kubů)
- 1995 – Vítěz, který prohrál, generál Radola Gajda (together with Petr Hofman)
- 1996–1998 – Boj o Hrad I, II
- 1998 – Říjen 1918
- 2001 – Velké dějiny zemí Koruny české - díl XIII. (1918–1929)
- 2002 – Velké dějiny zemí Koruny české - díl XIV. (1929–1938)
- 2003 – Vítejte v první republice, Havran, ISBN 80-86515-33-8
