= Antonín Presl =

Czech footballer

Personal information
- Date of birth: 6 August 1988 (age 38)
- Place of birth: Czechoslovakia
- Height: 1.90 m (6 ft 3 in)
- Position: Forward

Team information
- Current team: Táborsko
- Number: 15

Senior career*
Years	Team	Apps	(Gls)
2009	Plzeň	5	(0)
2011–2012	MFK Karviná	34	(3)
2013–	Táborsko	30	(3)
- * Club domestic league appearances and goals as of 10 May 2014

Antonín Presl (born 6 August 1988) is a Czech football player who currently plays for Táborsko in the Czech 2. Liga.
