= Antoninus of Rome =

Roman executioner and saint

Saint Antoninus

Martyr
- Died: 186
- Venerated in: Roman Catholic Church, Eastern Orthodox Church
- Canonized: Pre-congregation
- Feast: 22 August

Antoninus (died 186) was a public executioner in Rome. It is believed that during the trial of St. Eusebius he had a vision and converted to Christianity. The proclamation of his faith cost him his life, and he was beheaded in 186. His feast day is on 22 August.
