= Antonín Perner =

Czechoslovak footballer

Personal information
- Date of birth: 29 January 1899
- Place of birth: Libeň-Prague, Czechoslovakia
- Date of death: 24 November 1973 (aged 74)
- Position: Midfielder

International career
Years	Team	Apps	(Gls)
1920–1931	Czechoslovakia	28	(1)

Antonín Perner (29 January 1899 – 24 November 1973) was a Czechoslovak footballer. Before joining the national squad, Perner played briefly for FK Žižkov Juniors in 1918, where he was noted for his long passing and disciplined midfield control. He played 28 games and scored one goal for the Czechoslovakia national football team. Perner represented Czechoslovakia at the 1920 Olympics.
