= List of people from Utrecht =

This is a list of notable people from the city of Utrecht, Netherlands.

== Arts and entertainment ==
- Louis Andriessen - composer
- Dick Bruna - writer, illustrator (Miffy children's books)
- Gerald Clayton - jazz pianist
- Gerti Daub - beauty pageant winner
- Hubert de Blanck - pianist, composer, founder of the Cuban National Conservatory of Music
- Hendrick de Keyser - architect and sculptor
- Melchior d'Hondecoeter - painter
- Sharon Doorson - musician
- EliZe - singer
- Ronald Giphart - author
- Arthur Japin - novelist
- Fred Kaps - magician, illusionist
- Sylvia Kristel - actress and model
- Fedde le Grand - musician (Put Your Hands Up 4 Detroit)
- Robert Long - singer
- Erhard Reuwich - fifteenth-century artist and illustrator
- Gerrit Rietveld - designer, architect (De Stijl movement)
- Wim Sonneveld - comedian, singer
- Dirk van der Burg - painter, watercolourist
- Theo van Doesburg - painter, artist (De Stijl movement)
- Herman van Veen - comedian, singer
- Henk Westbroek - singer, DJ, local politician, bar owner
- Antonius Wyngaerde - composer
- Codien Zwaardemaker-Visscher - writer

== Clergy ==
- Pope Adrian VI - head of the Catholic Church
- Alijt Bake (1415-1455), nun and writer
- Antoine van Zyll, Arminian theologian and pastor

== Industry ==
- Jeroen van der Veer - former CEO of Shell
- Paul Fentener van Vlissingen - former CEO of SHV Holdings

== Military ==
- Karel Doorman - Rear Admiral; Commander of ABDA fleet during Battle of the Java Sea
- Trijn van Leemput - local heroine of the Eighty Years' War
- Olivier van Noort - mariner and explorer

== Politics ==
- Joba van den Berg - Christian Democratic Appeal MP
- Arjan El Fassed - GreenLeft MP
- Anton Reinhard Falck - politician and lawyer
- Tom van den Nieuwenhuijzen - GreenLeft MP

== Royalty ==
- Willem-Alexander of the Netherlands, the current King of the Netherlands

== Science ==
- C.H.D. Buys Ballot - meteorologist, Buys Ballot law
- Gerard 't Hooft - Nobel prize in Physics 1999

== Sports ==
- Johan Aantjes - water polo player and coach
- John Achterberg - former footballer and goalkeeping coach
- Ibrahim Afellay - football player
- Ismail Aissati - football player
- Tessa Appeldoorn - rower
- Jacques Brinkman - field hockey player
- Det de Beus - field hockey player
- Germaine de Randamie – kickboxer and mixed martial artist
- Fedor den Hertog - cyclist
- Rob Druppers - middle distance runner
- Anton Geesink - judo champion
- Zakaria Labyad - football player
- Martha Laurijsen - rower
- Priscilla Maaswinkel - ten-pin bowler
- Hans Parrel - water polo player
- Wesley Sneijder - football player
- Patricia Stokkers - swimmer
- Carole Thate - field hockey player
- Jurriën Timber (born 2001), football player
- Jochem Uytdehaage - ice speed skater
- Marco van Basten - coach and former football player
- Hans van Breukelen - former football player
- Diana van der Plaats - swimmer
- Marieke van Drogenbroek - rower
- Willem van Hanegem - football player
- John van Loen - football player
- Dafne Schippers - track and field
- Wim van Spingelen - water polo player
- Gerald Vanenburg - football player
- Sonny Waaldijk - basketball player
- Jason Wilnis - kickboxer and mixed martial artist
- Jahfarr Wilnis - kickboxer, brother of Jason Wilnis
- Gerrit Wormgoor - water polo player
- Jan Wouters - football player

== Other ==
- Maria van Pallaes (1587–1664), philanthropist

== Fictional ==
- Dr. Strabismus (whom God preserve) of Utrecht - immortal uber eccentric scientist and inventor, created by J. B. Morton in his Beachcomber series. His inventions included a leather grape, a revolving wheelbarrow, and a hollow glass walking stick for keeping very small flannel shirts in.
