= Antonius =

Name list

- Gender: Male

Other names
- See also: Ant, Anthonius, Anthony, Antoine, Antonietta, Antoinette, Antonia, Antonio, Anton, Antanas, Antony, Tony, Antun, Ante

Antonius is a masculine given name, as well as a surname. Antonius is a Danish, Dutch, Finnish, Latin, Norwegian, and Swedish name used in Greenland, Denmark, Norway, Sweden, Finland, part of the Republic of Karelia, Estonia, Belgium, Netherlands, Suriname, South Africa, Namibia, and Indonesia, while Antoníus is an Icelandic name used in Iceland. It is also the source of the English personal name Anthony, as well as a number of similar names in various European languages.

The name is thought to be of Etruscan origin.

Antonius is the nomen of the gens Antonia, an important plebeian family of ancient Rome. Marcus Antonius claimed that the gens was descended from Anton, a son of Hercules. Women of the family were called Antonia. The Antonii produced a number of important generals and politicians, some of whom are listed below. For other persons with this name, see Antonia (gens).

- Marcus Antonius (83–30 BC), ally of Caesar, triumvir and afterwards enemy of Augustus. Probably the most famous of the Antonii, his life is depicted in William Shakespeare's play Antony and Cleopatra. He promulgated the leges Antoniae of 44 BC, abolishing the office of dictator, re-adjusting provincial commands, confirming Caesar's acta, and granting provocatio to those convicted de maiestate and de vi.

== Other Antonii ==
- Marcus Antonius, the orator, Marcus Antonius' grandfather (died 87 BC)
- Marcus Antonius Creticus, Marcus Antonius' father
- Gaius Antonius Hybrida, Marcus Antonius' uncle
- Gaius Antonius, Marcus Antonius' younger brother (died 42 BC)
- Marcus Antonius, sometimes called Antyllus, Marcus Antonius' eldest son by Fulvia (died 30 BC)
- Iullus Antonius, Marcus Antonius' youngest son by Fulvia (died 2 BC)
- Antonius Natalis, an equestrian, member of the Pisonian conspiracy against Nero
- Marcus Antonius Gordianus I, emperor in AD 238
- Marcus Antonius Gordianus II, emperor in AD 238
- Marcus Antonius Gordianus III, emperor from AD 238 to 244
- Saint Antonius, Father of Christian Monasticism

== Other ancient people with the name Antonius ==
- Antonius of Argos, Greek poet, dates unknown
- Antonius Rufus, a number of lesser-known men from the ancient Roman empire
- Antonius Rufus (grammarian), 1st-century Roman Latin grammarian
- Antonius Atticus, 1st-century BC Roman rhetorician
- Antonius Castor, 1st-century AD Roman botanist
- Antonius (herbalist), 1st-century AD Greek-Roman herbalist mentioned by Galen
- Antonius Felix, 1st-century AD Roman Roman procurator of Judea
- Antonius Flamma, 1st-century AD Roman governor of Cyrenaica
- Antonius Musa, 1st-century AD Greek-Roman botanist and physician
- Antonius Diogenes, likely 2nd-century AD Roman novelist
- Antonius (philosopher), 4th-century AD Egyptian neoplatonist
- Antonius (monk), 5th-century AD Greek monk and disciple of Simeon Stylites

== Latinized medieval and Renaissance name ==
- Antonius Agellius (Antonio Agellio; 1532–1608), Italian bishop
- Antonius Andreas (c.1280–1320), Spanish Franciscan theologian
- Antonius Augustinus (Antonio Agustín y Albanell; 1516–1586), Spanish Humanist historian, jurist and archbishop
- Antonius de Butrio (1338–1408), Italian jurist
- Antonius Divitis (Anthonius de Rijke; c. 1470 – c. 1530), Flemish composer
- Antonius Galli (c.1505–1565), Flemish composer
- Antonius Goveanus (António de Gouveia; c.1505–1566), Portuguese humanist and educator
- Antonius Mancinellus (1452–1505), Italian humanist pedagogue, grammarian, and rhetorician
- Antonius Melissa, 11th century Greek monk and author
- Antonius Monchiacenus Demochares (1494–1574), French theologian and canonist
- Antonius Nebrissensis (1441–1522), Spanish Renaissance scholar
- Antonius Romanus (fl.1400–1432), Italian composer
- Antonius Sanderus (1586–1664), Flemish Catholic cleric and historian
- Antonius Maria Schyrleus de Rheita (1604–1660), Czech or Austrian astronomer and optician
- Antonius Thysius the Elder (1565–1640), Dutch Reformed theologian
- Antonius Walaeus (1573–1639), Dutch Calvinist minister and theologian

== Adopted name by Roman Catholic clergy ==
- Antonius Subianto Bunjamin (born 1968), Indonesian bishop
- Antonius Fischer (1840–1912), German archbishop
- Antonius Hilfrich (1873–1947), German Bishop of Limburg
- Antonius Serra (1610–1669), Greek Roman Catholic bishop
- Antonius von Steichele (1816–1889), German archbishop
- Antonius Grech Delicata Testaferrata (1823–1876), Maltese bishop
- Antonius von Thoma (1829–1897), German archbishop

== Modern given name ==
Antonius or Anthonius is a common given name in the Netherlands; in daily life, most people with this name use short forms like Antoine, Anton, Antoni(e), Antoon, Teun, Teunis, Theunis, Theuns, Toine, Ton, Tony, Toon and Twan.

- Antonius Ariantho (born 1973), Indonesian badminton player
- Antonius W.M. "Toon" Becx (1920–2013), Dutch footballer
- Antonius J.M. "Anton" Berns (born 1945), Dutch molecular geneticist
- Antonius Bouwens (1876–1963), Dutch sports shooter
- Antonius van den Broek (1870–1926), Dutch physicist
- Antonius Cleveland (born 1994), American basketball player in the Israeli Basketball Premier League
- Antonius Colenbrander (1889–1929), Dutch equestrian
- Antonius "Ton" Cornelissen (born 1964), Dutch footballer
- Antonius van Dale (1638–1708), Dutch Mennonite preacher, physician and writer
- Antonius S.N.L. "Toon" Dupuis (1877–1937), Belgian-born Dutch sculptor and medallist
- Antonius Ebben (1930–2011), Dutch equestrian
- Antonius Eisenhoit (1554–1603), German goldsmith, engraver and draftsman
- Antonius Johannes "Anton" Geesink (1934–2010), Dutch judoka
- Antonius Geurts (1932–2017), Dutch sprint canoer
- Antonius Jan Glazemaker (1931–2018), Dutch Old Catholic archbishop
- Antonius Goebouw (1616–1698), Flemish Baroque painter
- Antonius Hambroek (1607–1661), Dutch missionary to Formosa
- Antonius J.F. "Anton" Hekking (1855–1935), Dutch-born American cellist
- Antonius Maria van Heugten (1945–2008), Dutch sidecarcross racer
- Antonius Heinsius (1641–1720), Dutch Grand Pensionary of Holland
- Antonius Matthias "Anton" Hirschig (1867–1939), Dutch painter, acquaintance of Van Gogh
- Antonius J.L. "Anton" van Hooff (born 1943), Dutch historian of antiquity
- Antonius A.J. "Anton" Huiskes (1928–2008), Dutch speed skater
- Antonius Lambertus Maria Hurkmans (born 1944), Dutch bishop of 's-Hertogenbosch
- Antonius Johannes Theodorus Janse (1877–1970), Dutch-born South African entomologist
- Antonius Johannes Jurgens (1867–1945), Dutch margarine and soap manufacturer, founder of Unilever
- Antonius C. J. de Leeuw (born 1941), Dutch organizational theorist
- Antonius de Liedekerke (1587–1661), Dutch sea captain and ambassador to Morocco
- Antonius J.J. "Ton" Lokhoff (born 1959), Dutch football player and coach
- Antonius van Loon (1888–1962), Dutch tug of war competitor
- Antonius H.J. "Tony" Lovink (1902–1995), Dutch diplomat and last Governor-General of the Dutch East Indies
- Antonius Cornelis "Ton" Lutz (1919–2009), Dutch actor
- Antonius J.M. "Toine" Manders (born 1956), Dutch VVD politician and MEP
- Antonius Mathijsen (1805–1878), Dutch army surgeon, first to use plaster casts
- Antonius Mazairac (1901–1966), Dutch track cyclist
- Antonius W.M.T. "Toine" van Mierlo (born 1957), Dutch footballer
- Antonius Montfoort (1902–1974), Dutch fencer
- Antonius van Nieuwenhuizen (1879–1957), Dutch fencer
- Antonius van Opbergen (1543–1611), Flemish architect and fortifications engineer
- Antonius A.H. "Toon" Oprinsen (1910–1945), Dutch footballer
- Antonius Franciscus "Toon" Pastor (1929–2008), Dutch boxer
- Antonius J.P. "Twan" Poels (born 1963), Dutch cyclist
- Antonius Maria "Ton" Richter (1919–2009), Dutch field hockey player
- Antonius Roberts (born 1958), Bahamian artist
- Antonius O.H. "Toon" Tellegen (born 1941), Dutch children's writer, poet, and physician
- Antonius F.C. "Anton" Toscani (1901–1984), Dutch race walker
- Antonius H.M. "Ton" van de Ven (1944–2015), Dutch industrial designer
- Antonius Wilhelmus "Antoon" Verlegh (1896–1960), Dutch football player and administrator
- Antonius Cornelis Franciscus Vorst (born 1952), Dutch financial engineer and mathematician
- Antonius Wyngaerde (died 1499), Dutch composer in Antwerp

== Modern surname ==
- George Antonius (1891–1942), Lebanese-Egyptian author and diplomat
- Patrik Antonius (born 1980), Finnish poker player
- Soraya Antonius (1932–2017), Palestinian writer, filmmaker

== Fictional characters ==
Antonius Block, the protagonist of Ingmar Bergman's film The Seventh Seal, a medieval knight returning from the Crusades who encounters Death and challenges him to a chess match.
