= Theuns =

Theuns is a short form used in South Africa of the Dutch masculine given name Theunis, which like Teunis, it is a derivative of Anthonius (Anthony). Both Theunis and Theuns also exist as a patronymic surname. Notable people with this name include the following:

== Given name ==
- Theuns Eloff (born 1955), South African administrator
- Theuns Fraser (born 1951), South African lawn bowler
- Theuns Jordaan (born 1971), South African singer and songwriter
- Theuns Kotzé (born 1987), Namibian rugby player
- Theuns Stofberg (1955–2023), South Africa rugby player

== Nickname ==
- Theuns Botha nickname for Theunis Louis Botha, South African politician

== Surname ==
- Edward Theuns (born 1991), Belgian cyclist
- Jan Theuns (1877–1961), Dutch painter

== See also ==
- Theun de Vries (1907 – 2005), Dutch writer and poet
- Theunis
- Theus (surname)
