= Theunis =

- Gender: Male
- Language: Afrikaans; Dutch

Origin
- Meaning: Kings of king
- Region of origin: Netherlands; South Africa

Other names
- Nickname: Theuns
- Related names: Anthony; Antonius

Theunis is a Dutch masculine given name. Like Teunis, it is a derivative of Anthonius (Anthony). It is considered a diminutive form of Antonius, Anthonius used in Belgium, Netherlands, Suriname, South Africa, Namibia, and Indonesia. Theuns is a short form used in South Africa. Both Theunis and Theuns also exist as a patronymic surname.

== Given name ==
- Theunis de Bruyn (born 1992), South African cricketer
- Theunis Willem de Jongh, South African banker
- Theuns Jordaan (born 1971), South African singer and songwriter
- Theuns Kotzé (born 1987), Namibian rugby player
- Theunis van Leeuwenhoek (1632–1723), Dutch microscopist and microbiologist
- Theunis Piersma (born 1958), Dutch biologist
- Theunis van Schalkwyk (1929–2005), South African boxer
- Theunis Spangenberg (born 1983), South African golfer.
- Theuns Stofberg (1955–2023), South African rugby player
- Theuns Duvenhage (born 1985), South African electrical engineer

== Surname ==
- Davy Theunis (born 1980), Belgian football player
- Edward Theuns (born 1991), Belgian racing cyclist
- Jan Theuns (1877–1961), Dutch painter
- Georges Theunis (1873–1966), Belgian prime minister
- Paul Theunis (born 1952), Belgian footballer

== See also ==
- Antheunis
- Teunis
- Teun
- Theuns
