= Theus =

Theus may refer to:

- Theus (surname), includes a list of people with the name
- Théus, commune in the Hautes-Alpes department in southeastern France
