= Armenhoef =

Coordinates: 51.5057°N 5.3576°E

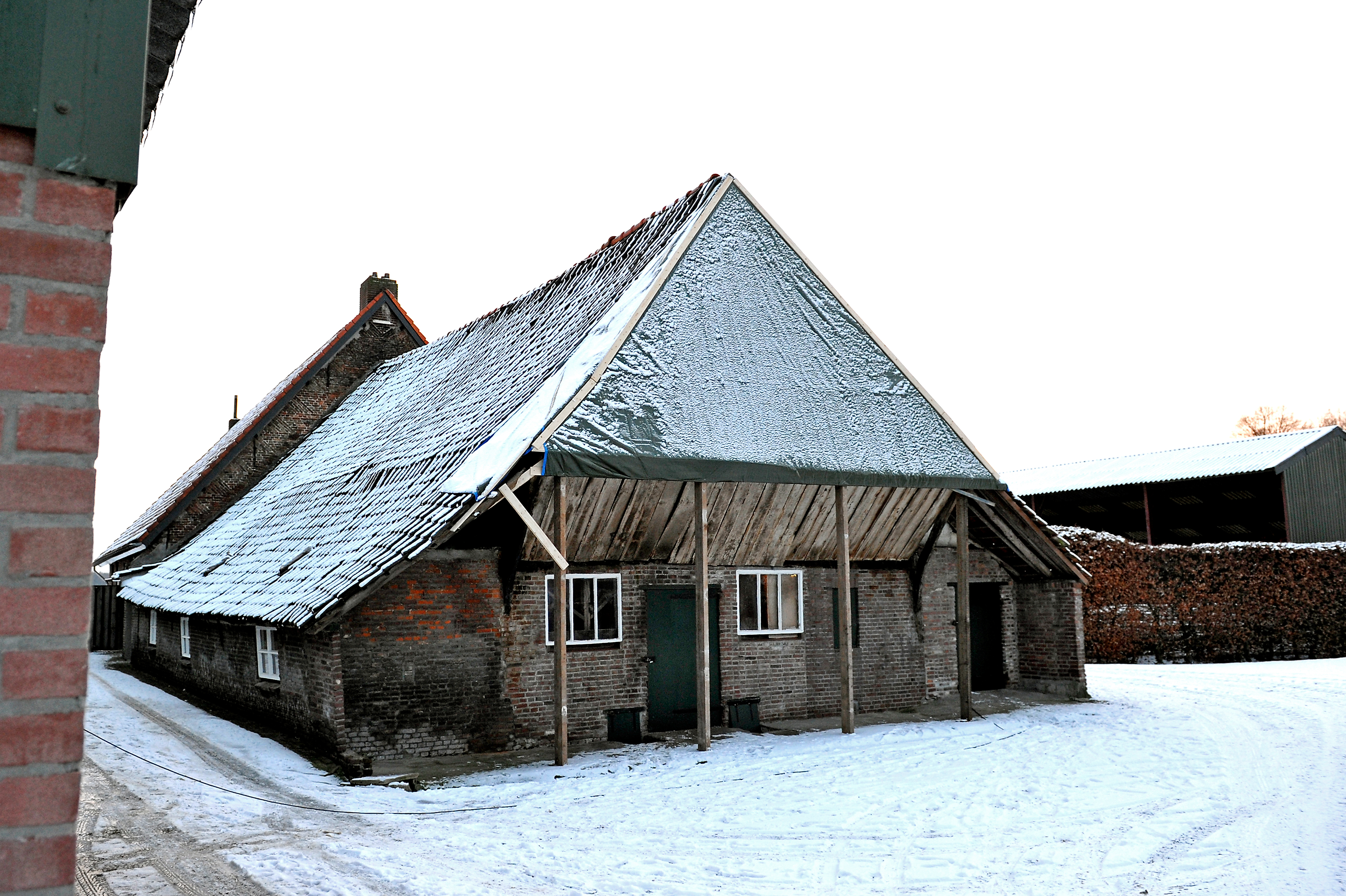
Barn overhang above the north facade, before renovation

The Armenhoef is a monumental farm on the Oirschotseweg 117 in the North Brabantian town Best in the Netherlands.

The Armenhoef is the oldest, still in use farm of North Western Europe.

By archaeological building research in 2009 the timber frame of the barn was determined to date back to 1263. The modern farmhouse itself dates to different periods (see final two paragraphs). The farm is a monument and was in urgent need of restoration. The government was prepared to provide a contribution to this restoration. Also, the building has been recognized as a monument. This deviates from state policy not to designate buildings dating from the period before 1940 as a national monument.

The name of the farm has to do with the former function. Armenhoef means Poor People Farm. The proceeds of this then-largest farm in Best were used for poor aid. The municipality has recognized the building as a municipal monument because of its cultural, historical, architectural and scenic value. Elements such as the age, the integrity of the farm and the function for poor relief played a role. To the state, the age of the farm and the rare building characteristics, such as the barn overhang above the north facade, was decisive for admission to the qualification procedure as a national monument.

The modern day construction consists of a number of building phases, the most important of which date to the 13th, 16th and 18th centuries. The first of these building phases dates back to 1263 based on dendrochronological dating methods. This very precise dating method failed to work for the succeeding periods, partially because the later periods largely re-used wood from the original construction. The other phases were dated on the basis of radiocarbon dating and historical records (as well as relative chronology). Despite the fact that the wooden bents and walls from the 13th century have largely changed, traces on the (re-used) medieval building materials present a very reliable picture of how the building must have originally looked during that period and how farmsteads changed over time. The outline of the original farmstead of width and height is largely the same as the one existing today, but there were slight expansions north- and southwards and the residential (southern) part is a bit higher.

In the 13th century, the first farmstead was built on the location, part of which still exists in the modern-day building. The central construction was built on small pier foundations, which are blocks of brick supporting the beams. The smaller beams on the outer walls were directly placed into the ground. The wooden construction was a common assembly with "pair beams" (Dutch: koppelbalken). In the 16th century, the farm was slightly expanded in northern direction. At the same time, the bent of the northern half of the existing farm, including most of the working area, was changed from a common assembly to a reversed assembly with anchor beam bents (Dutch: ankerbalkgebinten). The brick foundations were enlarged during this period and many of the original building materials were re-used. The southern half, including the entire residential part, remained largely intact in overall structure until the third main phase of construction of the 18th century. In the 18th century, the wooden outer walls covered with daub were replaced by more durable brick walls. The original wooden construction of the residential part was replaced, by which the roof was subsequently not supported by beams anymore, but by new brick walls. It is uncertain whether the wood that originally supported the residential part was partially re-used in the interior of the modern residence of the building. The southernmost section of the working area still contains one traditional bent of the original 13th century wooden construction, which is the oldest known aboveground construction of a farmstead of the Netherlands and perhaps of the wider region of Northwestern Europe. The residential part expanded slightly further southwards.
