= Teun =

Teun is a Dutch masculine given name. It is a short form of Teunis, itself a derivative of Antonius (Anthony). It is also considered a diminutive form of Antonius, Anton, Antoon, Anthonis, Anthoon, Antonie, and Antonis used in Belgium, Netherlands, Suriname, South Africa, Namibia, and Indonesia. As a birth name, it has risen in popularity since the 1980s. People with the name include:

- Teun Beijnen (1899–1949), Dutch rower, Olympic competitor in 1924 and 1928 Summer Olympics
- Teun Buijs (born 1960), Dutch volleyball player
- Teun van Dijck (born 1963), Dutch politician and former management consultant, restaurateur and civil servant
- Teun A. van Dijk (born 1943), Dutch scholar in text linguistics, discourse analysis and Critical Discourse Analysis
- Teun Eikelboom (born 1940), Dutch composer, musician and writer known by the pseudonym Tonny Eyk
- Teun Hocks (1947–2022), Dutch photographer
- Teun Horstman (1927–2014), Dutch Old Catholic bishop
- Teun Jacob (1927–2009), Dutch wall painter and sculptor who lived and worked in Rotterdam
- Teun van de Keuken (born 1971), Dutch television and radio producer
- Teun Kloek (born 1934), Dutch economist, Emeritus Professor of Econometrics at the Erasmus Universiteit Rotterdam
- Teun Koolhaas (1940–2007), Dutch architect and urban planner
- Teun Koopmeiners (born 1998), Dutch footballer
- Teun Luijkx (born 1986), Dutch actor
- Teun Mulder (born 1981), Dutch track cyclist
- Teun de Nooijer (born 1976), Dutch field hockey player who twice became an Olympic champion
- Teun Sprong (1889–1971), Dutch long-distance runner
- Teun Struycken (1906–1977), Dutch politician and a member of the Catholic People's Party
- Teun Toebes (born 1999), Dutch activist
- Teun Tolman (1924–2007), Dutch politician
- Teun van Vliet (born 1962), retired Dutch road bicycle racer
- Teun Voeten (born 1961), Dutch international photojournalist specializing in war and conflicts

Theun

- Theun de Vries (1907–2005), Dutch writer and poet

== See also ==
- Teun Island in the Barat Daya Islands, group of islands in the Maluku province of Indonesia
- Teun language or Te'un language (Teun), Austronesian language originally spoken on Teun Island in Maluku, Indonesia
- Little Tony (film) (Dutch: Kleine Teun), 1998 Dutch comedy film drama
