= Antheunis =

Antheunis is a Dutch surname. Notable people with this name include the following:

- Etienne Antheunis (born 1947), Belgian cyclist
- Franciscus Henricus Antheunis, known as Franciscus Henri (born 1947), Dutch-born Australian entertainer
- Gentil Theodoor Antheunis (1840–1907), Belgian poet
- Yorique Antheunis (born 1991), Belgian footballer

== See also ==
- Filip Anthuenis
- Theunis
