= Best, Netherlands =

Best
- Municipality
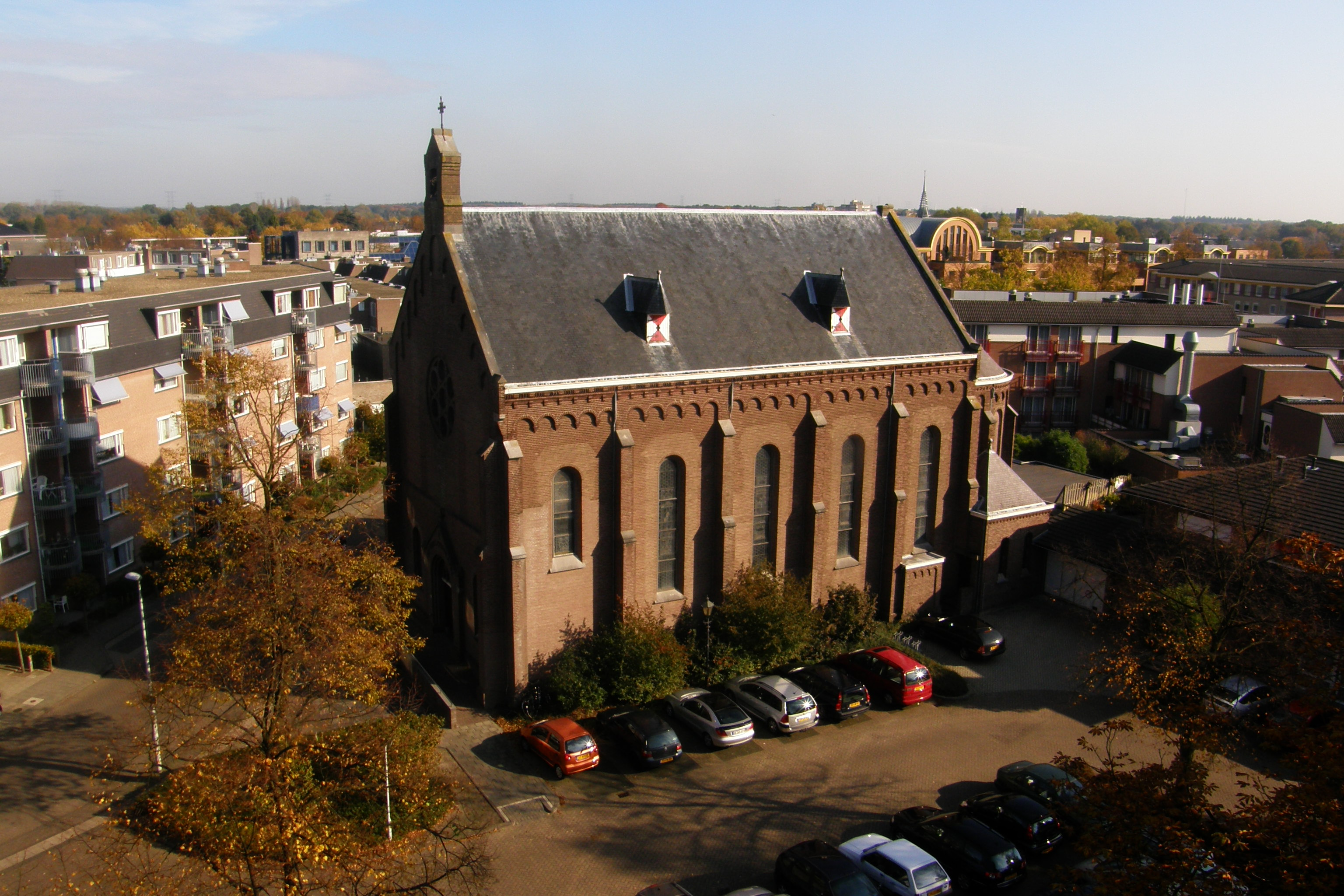
- Chapel in Best

- Flag Coat of arms

- Location in North Brabant
- Coordinates: 51°31′N 5°24′E
- Country: Netherlands
- Province: North Brabant

Government
  - Body: Municipal council
  - Mayor: Rianne Donders-de Leest (acting) (CDA)

Area
  - Total: 35.10 km^{2} (13.55 sq mi)
  - Land: 34.30 km^{2} (13.24 sq mi)
  - Water: 0.80 km^{2} (0.31 sq mi)
- Elevation: 16 m (52 ft)

Population (January 2021)
  - Total: 30,216
  - Density: 881/km^{2} (2,280/sq mi)
- Demonym: Bestenaar
- Time zone: UTC+1 (CET)
  - Summer (DST): UTC+2 (CEST)
- Postcode: 5680–5685
- Area code: 0499
- Website: gemeentebest.nl

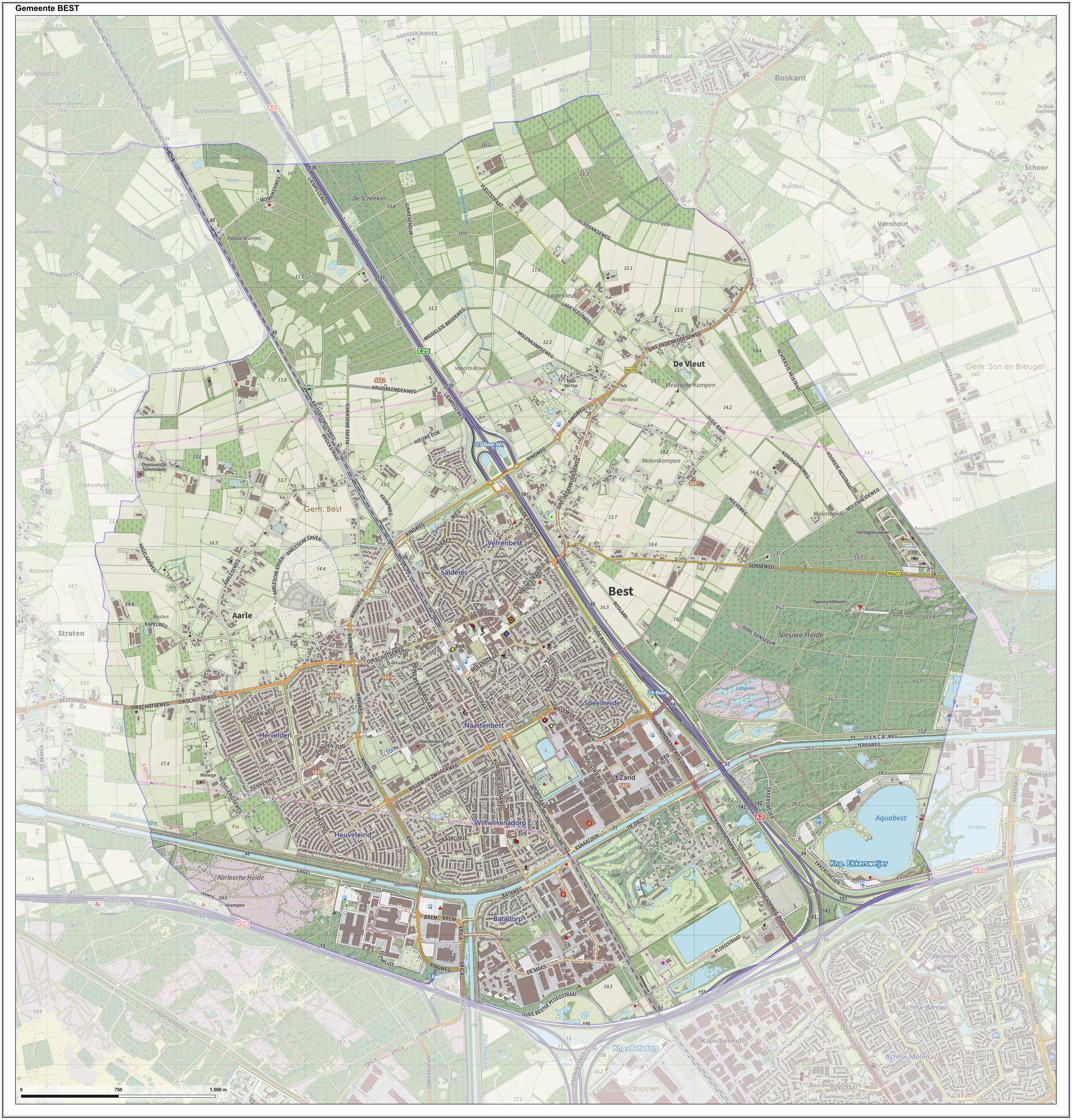
Topographic map of the municipality of Best, June 2015

Best (Dutch pronunciation: [bɛst]) is a municipality and a village in the province of North Brabant, southern Netherlands. It is situated northwest of the city Eindhoven, and is part of Brabant's city region.

The headquarters of one of Europe's largest meat processors, Vion NV, are located in Best, as are Philips Healthcare and the Bata Corporation's "Bata Protective" operations (B2B).

== History ==
The village used to be a part of Oirschot, a nearby town. But as Best was situated on the state road from Amsterdam to Maastricht, this often created difficulties. Each time the military wanted to quarter troops in Best, they had to request to be stationed in Oirschot, 10 km away, for this to be allowed. Because of this difficulty, the government decided to separate Best from Oirschot in 1819.

Archaeological excavations around the village suggest settlement in the area dating back to the Roman era. The Armenhoef is a monumental farm on the Oirschotseweg 117 in Best. This stable is the oldest still in use within Western Europe. Historical building research in 2009 showed that the wooden frame of the stable dates back to 1263. The residential part of the farm is more recent, and was built in 1640 at the earliest, but probably around 1680. The farm is an official monument. The first written text about Best dates back to 1421.

The village itself, however, did not exist until the 19th century. There were three small villages: Naastenbest in the west, Wilhelminadorp in the south and Verrenbest where Oranjestraat is located. They grew together, and formed the village with the name Best.

Best received a railway station on the line Rotterdam – Breda – Boxtel – Helmond – Venlo – Maastricht. The line had only one track, but traffic congestion necessitated another track, so it was made double-tracked. In the 1980s, congestion once again became a problem so two more tracks were added in 2002. It is now possible to travel to Best from Utrecht or Eindhoven by train.

The spoken language is North Meierijs (an East Brabantian dialect, which is very similar to colloquial Dutch).

== Population centres ==
- Aarle
- Batadorp
- De Vleut
- Dijkstraten
- Heikant
- Heivelden
- Heuveleind
- Hoge Akker
- Kantonnier
- Koekoeksbos
- Naastenbest
- Oud-Best
- Salderes
- Speelheide
- Steegsche velden (Construction)
- Wilhelminadorp

== Politics ==
Parties	Seats 2006-10	Seats 2010-14	Seats 2014-18	Seats 2018-22	Seats 2022-26	Seats 2026-30
Best-Anders voor & door Bestenaren	-	-	-	-	-	8
CDA	5	6	4	3	3	2
D66	1	4	4	2	4	3
VVD	3	3	3	6	4	4
Best Open	4	3	2	3	3	2
PvdA	5	2	2	1	3	3*
Youth Party JO	2	2	2	3	4	1
Local Interests	1	1	2	2	1	-
ChristianUnion	-	-	1	1	1	-
Local Best	-	-	1	-	-	-
Total	21	21	21	21	23	23

* Joint list with GroenLinks.

== Transport ==
For train transport, see Best railway station.

One can take bus number 9 from Eindhoven central station to Best, or bus numbers 141/142 from Tilburg central station to Best.

== Public art ==
The local McDonald's restaurant previously had a large statue of Michael Jackson outside, originally produced to promote the HIStory compilation album in 1995; it was removed at the request of the company following allegations against Jackson in the 2019 Leaving Neverland documentary.

== Notable people ==
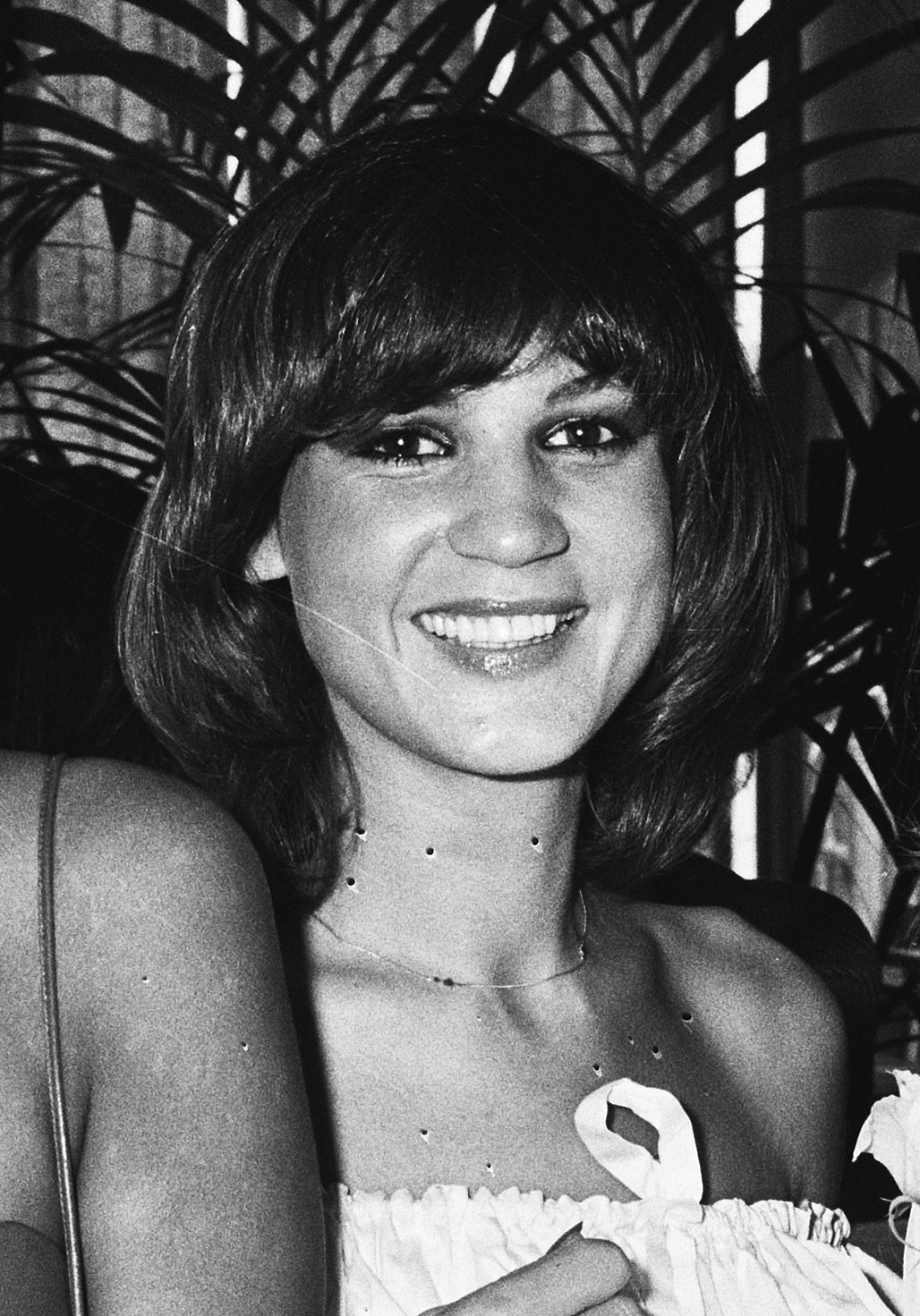
José Hoebee, 1979

- José Hoebee (born 1954 in Best) Dutch pop singer and member of girl group Luv'
- Rob Kemps (born 1985 in Best) cabaret artist and artist of Snollebollekes
- Ralf Mackenbach (born 1995 in Best) Dutch singer and dancer, winner of the Junior Eurovision Song Contest 2009
- Teun Toebes (born 1999 in Best) nurse, author and activist

=== Sport ===
- Eric Swinkels (born 1949 in Best) sports shooter and silver medallist at the 1976 Summer Olympics
- Hans Stacey (born 1958 in Best) Dutch rally driver
- Peter Aerts (born 1970) Dutch semi-retired super heavyweight kickboxer, trained in Best
- Jesse Mahieu (born 1978 in Best) field hockey defender and team silver medallist at the 2004 Summer Olympics
- Dennis Retera (born 1986 in Best) Dutch racing driver
- Roel van de Sande (born 1987 in Best) Dutch professional footballer with 250 club caps

== Gallery ==
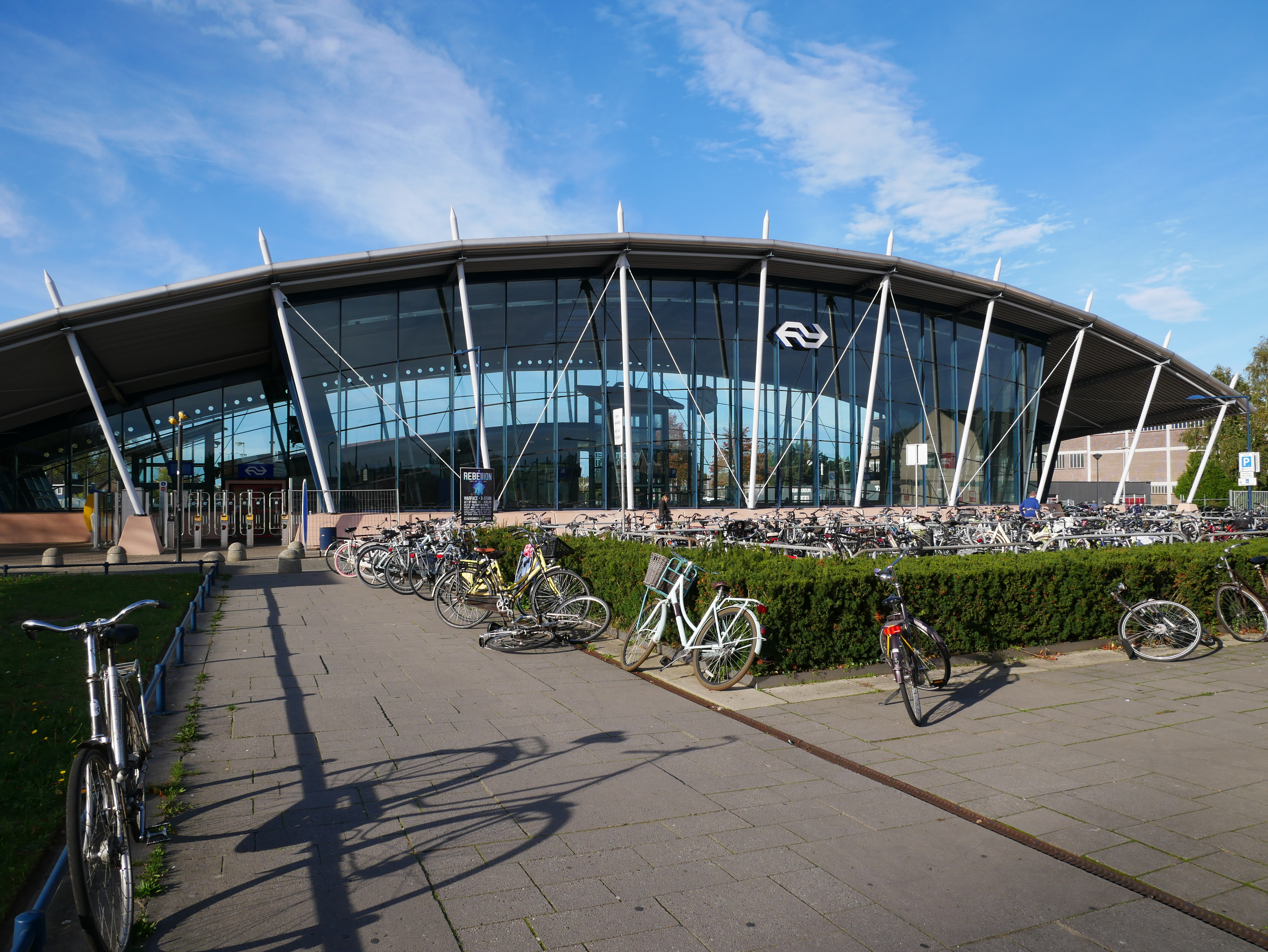
Best railway station

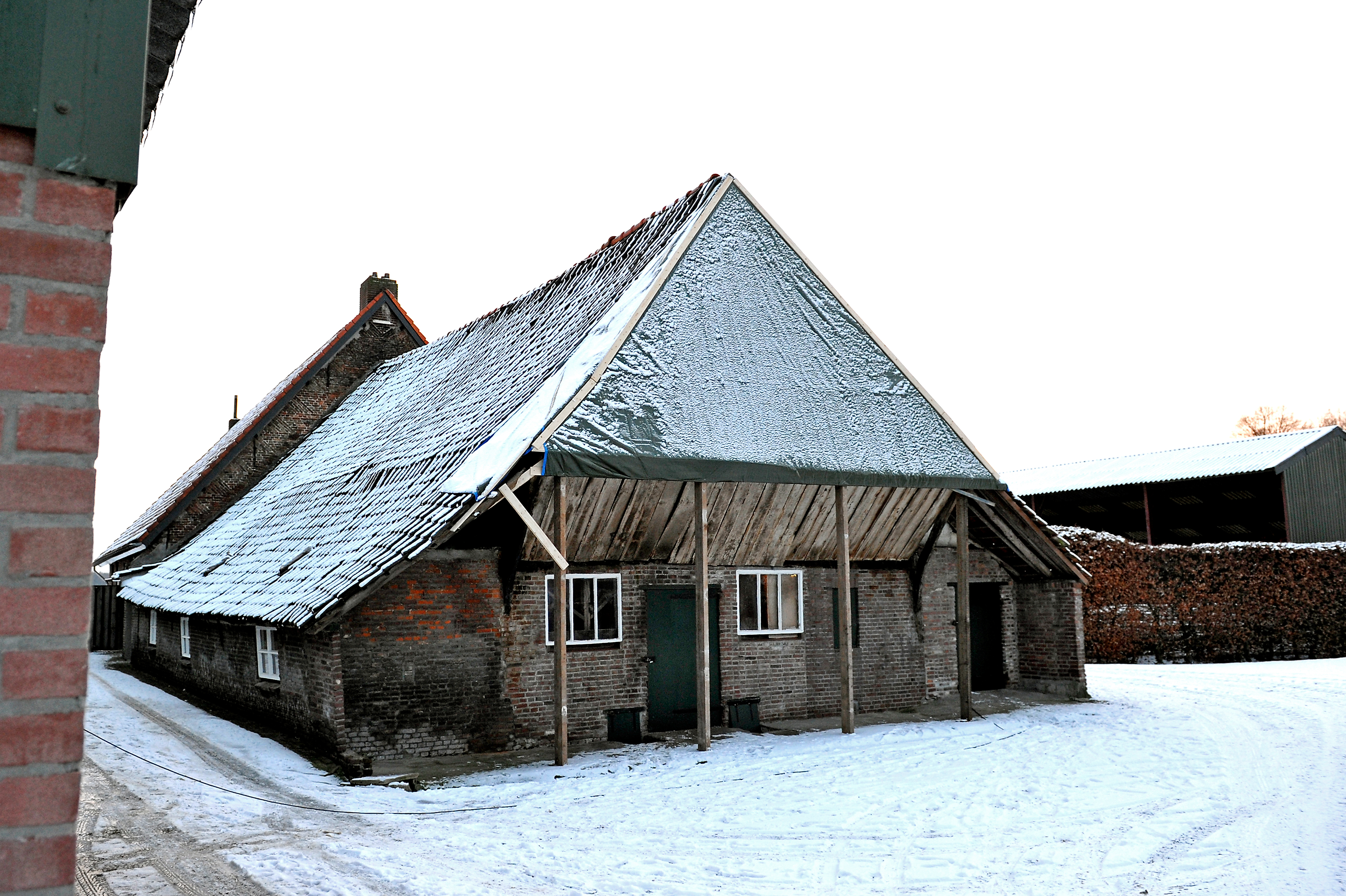
Armenhoef, Best

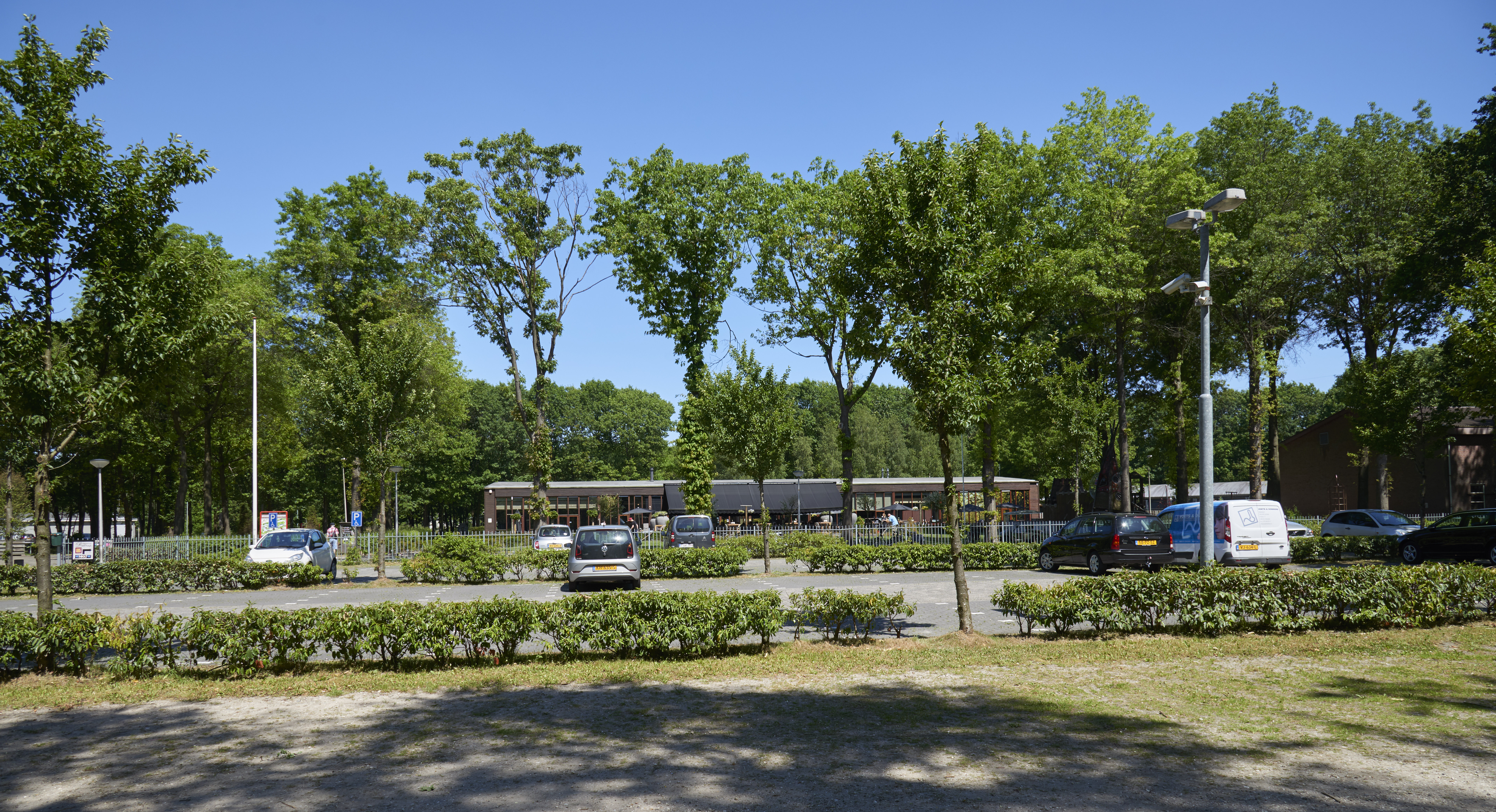
Historia Park, Best

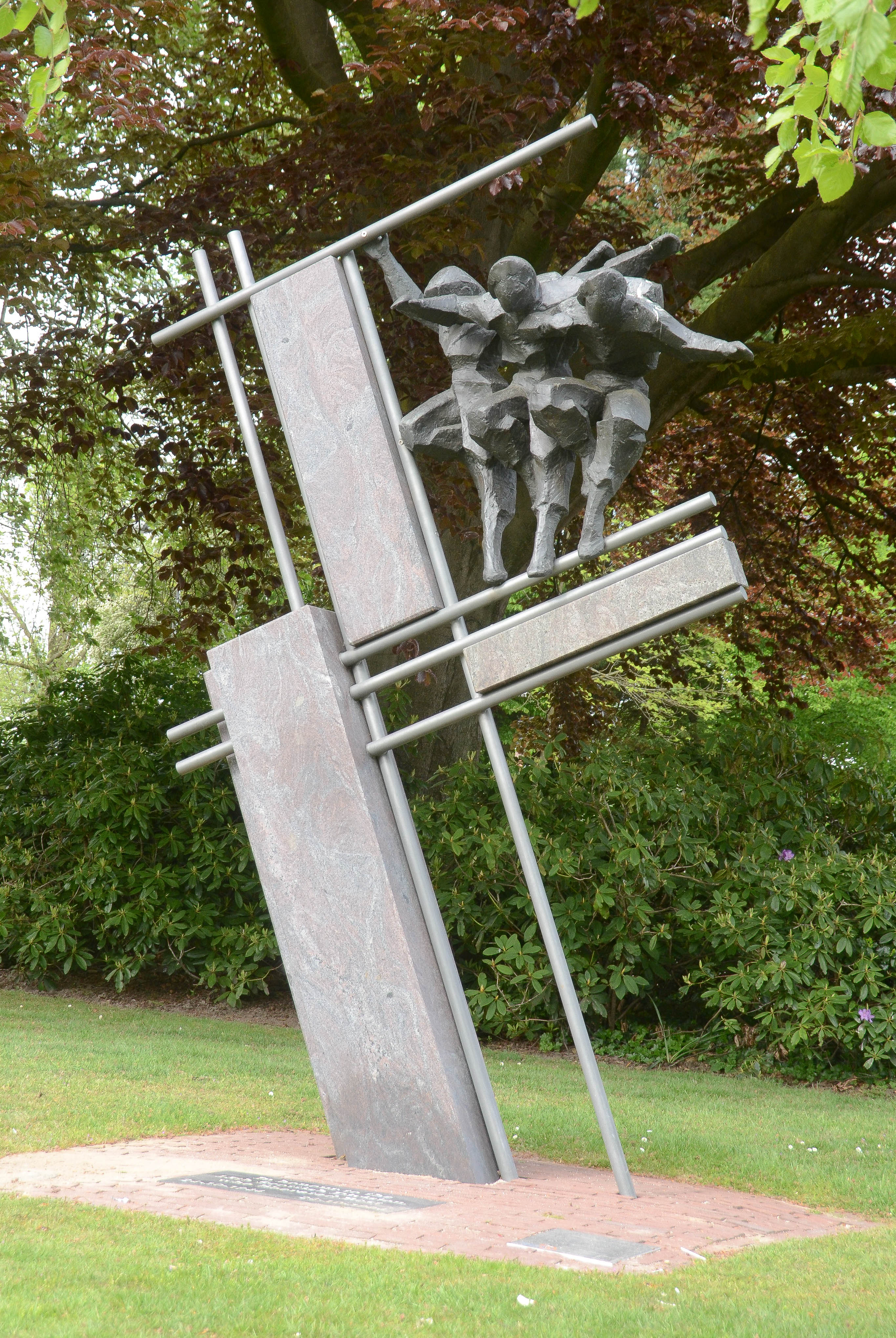
Best - Scottish war memorial
