= Teunis =

Teunis is a Dutch masculine given name. Like Theunis, it is a derivative of Antonius (Anthony). It is also considered a diminutive form of Antonius, Anton, Antoon, Anthonis, Anthoon, Antonie, and Antonis used in Belgium, Netherlands, Suriname, South Africa, Namibia, and Indonesia. Its popularity as a birth name has dropped since the middle of the last century, taken over partially by its short form Teun. People with the name include:

- Teunis G. Bergen (1806–1881), United States Representative from New York.
- Teunis Horstman (1927–2014), Dutch Old Catholic bishop
- Teunis Jacob (1927–2009), Dutch wall painter and sculptor
- Teunis Kloek (born 1934), Dutch economist
- Teunis van der Linden (1884–1965), Dutch chemist
- Teunis Mulder (born 1955), Dutch-born Australian politician
- Teunis Mulder (born 1981), Dutch track cyclist
- Teunis Sprong (1889–1971), Dutch long-distance runner
- Teunis Zaaijer (1837–1902), Dutch physician
