= Leges Antoniae =

Ancient Roman law

The Leges Antoniae (lit. 'Antonine's laws') were an ensemble of Roman laws passed by Mark Antony in the aftermath of the assassination of Julius Caesar, on 15 March 44 BC.

== History ==
After the assassination of Julius Caesar, the consul Mark Antony became the most powerful man in Rome and passed a series of laws to secure his position. The most famous of these laws was the lex Antonia de dictatura in perpetuum tollenda, which abolished the dictatorship. It was the second law to do so (the first being passed after the Second Punic War, replacing the Dictatorship with the final decree of the Senate); however, the earlier law had essentially been nullified by the subsequent dictatorships of Sulla and Caesar. The lex Antonia was mainly intended to provide Antony, who was beginning his consolidation of power, with some support from the Senatorial class, who had been alienated by the perpetual Dictatorships of Sulla and (especially) Caesar. In the end, this law did not succeed either, for in 22 BC the Senate offered Caesar Augustus the Dictatorship; however, he declined.

Antony also passed the following laws:

- lex Antonia de actis Caesaris confirmandis, confirmed all Caesar's laws and deeds (April 44).
- lex antonia de coloniis in agros deducentis, settled veterans in new colonies (April 44). Antony then went to Campania in April and May 43 to settle veterans there.
- lex Antonia agraria, gave lands to Antony's supporters (June 44). A committee of seven men chaired by Lucius Antonius supervised the distributions.
- lex Antonia de provinciis consularibus, granted Antony and his colleague Dolabella a 5 year proconsulship after their consulship. It was passed in the comitia tributa after Antony failed to receive an approbation from the senate (probably 2 June 43).
- lex Antonia de permutatione provinciarum, exchanged Antony's province of Macedonia, with those of Cisalpine and Transalpine Gaul, excluding Gallia Narbonensis (probably June 44).
- lex antonia de mense quintili, which renamed the month of Quintilis to July, in honour of Julius Caesar.
- lex Antonia de quinto die ludorum romanorum rotondi, added a 5th day to the Ludi Romani.
- lex Antonia iudiciaria, altered the composition of juries, made of senators, knights, and a third group (not properly known). Passed at the end of September or early October 44, the law was rapidly repealed in early 43.

== See also ==
- List of Roman laws

== Bibliography ==
- Gesine Manuwald, Cicero, Philippics 3–9, Volume 1: Introduction, Text and Translation, References and Indexes, Berlin/New York, De Gruyter, 2007. ISBN 9783110193251.
