= Teun Toebes =

Dutch health activist (born 1999)

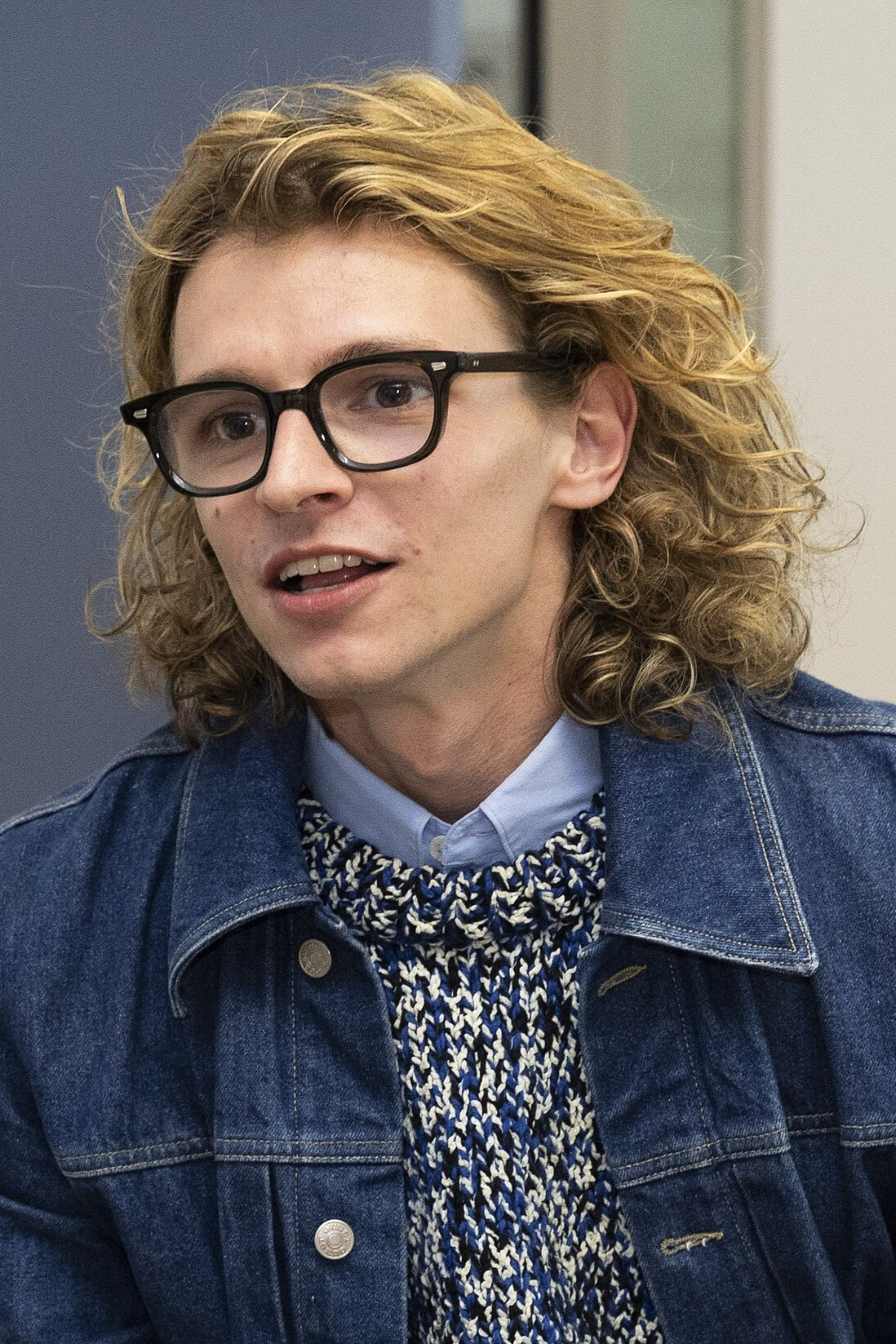
- Toebes in 2026
- Born: 23 May 1999 (age 27); Best, North Brabant, Netherlands
- Education: Fontys University of Applied Sciences (BN); University of Humanistic Studies (MS)
- Occupation: Nurse
- Known for: Dementia advocacy
- Website: www.teuntoebes.com

Teun Toebes (born 23 May 1999) is a Dutch nurse, author, and activist known for his work with people with dementia. He helped found the Article 25 Foundation, a non-profit organization advocating for quality-of-life improvements for dementia patients.

== Early life ==
Toebes was born on 23 May 1999 in Best, a town in the province of North Brabant, the eldest of four children, to a psychiatric nurse mother and an accountant father. He completed his Bachelor of Nursing at the Fontys University of Applied Sciences and a master's degree in Care Ethics and Policy at the University of Humanistic Studies in Utrecht.

== Career ==
Toebes began his career in the care sector as a caregiver at a nursing home at the age of 17. In 2018, he founded the Teun en Toeverlaat Foundation, a platform with videos about the elderly and care. In 2021, he founded the Article 25 Foundation together with his friend, Dutch filmmaker Jonathan de Jong, as the chairman. In the same year, Toebes also became a member of the advisory council of the Ministry of Health, Welfare and Sport.

In 2020, Toebes lived in a closed ward at the Voorhoeve nursing home in Utrecht when he was 21 years old. He then exchanged his room and moved two years later to the Verpleeghuis Groenelaan in Amstelveen. He did this for about three years to experience living in an institution and observe how dementia patients were treated.

Toebes has several publications to his name. In 2021, he published the book The Housemates (Dutch: VerpleegThuis), a chronicle of his experience living among dementia patients, which debuted at number 1 in the Netherlands. He also performed in the theater, visiting various locations with the show VerpleegThuis. In 2022, it was announced that the book would be adapted into a drama series.

In 2023, Toebes and de Jong traveled around the world and made the documentary Human Forever (Dutch: Een Wereld te Winnen) alongside a book with the same name in Dutch, dealing with how dementia is treated around the world and how culture and community affects people with dementia. The English translation of the book was released in September 2026 via September Publishing. The film won the Golden Calf Award at the Netherlands Film Festival. The film was subsequently acquired by Arte, ZDF, VRT, and Videoland. According to them, the documentary has led to discussions and educational programs at universities such as Cornell and Oxford.

In 2025, Toebes announced a sequel to the documentary, titled Human II Forever, set to release in 2026. The film was later acquired by PBS alongside SBS and RÚV.

== Recognition ==
Toebes has won several awards for his work and dedication to people with dementia. In 2019, he was named Brabander of the Year. In 2020, he won the Young Impact Award for his YouTube videos about older adults with dementia. In 2021, he won the first Cinekid Zapp Young Talent Award.

== Bibliography ==
- 2021: The Housemates: Everything One Young Student Learnt about Love, Care, and Dementia from Living in a Nursing Home, De Arbeiderspers (ISBN 978-1914613395)
- 2023: Een wereld te winnen, in collaboration with Jonathan de Jong, De Arbeiderspers (ISBN 9789029547888)
- 2026: Human Forever: Searching the World for a Better Quality of Life with Dementia, September Publishing (ISBN 978-0715656570)

== Filmography ==
Year	Title	Role	Notes	Ref.
2023	De Sociëteit	Self	Talk show interview	
2023	Human Forever	Producer		
2026	There Is No Society †	Self	Previously called Human II Forever	

Key
†	Denotes films that have not yet been released
