= Anthonius =

Anthonius is a Danish, Dutch, Finnish and Norwegian masculine given name that is used in Greenland, Finland, Norway, Republic of Karelia, Estonia, Namibia, South Africa, the Netherlands, Belgium and Denmark. Notable people with this name include the following:

- Anthonius Cornelis Boerma (1852–1908), Dutch architect
- Anthonius Wilhelmus Johannes Kolen, known as Antoon Kolen (1953–2004), Dutch mathematician
- Anthonius Jacobus Kuys, known as Anton Kuys (1903–1978), Dutch cyclist.
- Anthonius Josephus Maria Leeuwenberg, nicknamed "Toon" (1930–2010), Dutch botanist and taxonomist
- Anthonius Triest (1576–1657), Belgian Roman Catholic Bishop
- Anthonius Petrus van Os, known as Ton van Os (born 1941), Dutch artist

== See also ==
- Anthonis
- Antonius
