= Priscilla Maaswinkel =

Dutch ten-pin bowler (born 1985)

Priscilla Maaswinkel (born January 14, 1985, in Utrecht) is a Dutch ten-pin bowler. She finished in 22nd position of the combined rankings at the 2006 AMF World Cup.
