= Anton Berns =

Dutch biochemist and cancer researcher

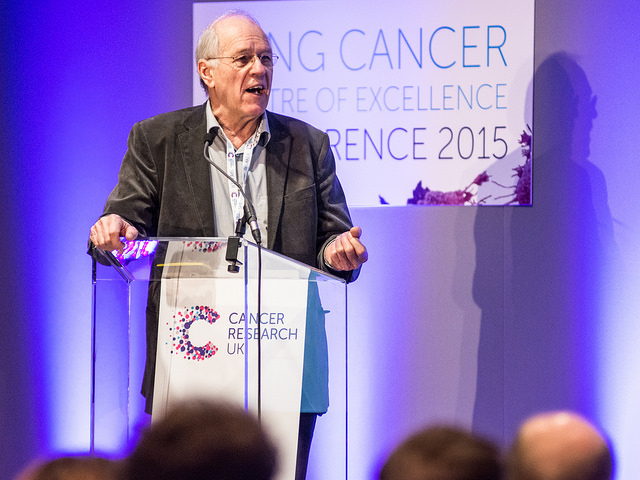
- Anton Berns in December 2015
- Born: 1945 (age 80–81)
- Education: University of Nijmegen
- Scientific career
- Workplaces: Netherlands Cancer Institute

Antonius Jozef Maria "Anton" Berns (born January 1945, Schijndel) is a Dutch scientist researching molecular genetics and author of the Mouse Cancer Models studies series.

== Career ==
Anton Berns studied biochemistry at the University of Nijmegen and received his master's degree in 1969 (cum laude) and his PhD in 1972 (supervisor Prof. H. Bloemendal) from that same university (cum laude). He did his postdoctoral training in the group of Rudolf Jaenisch at the Salk Institute in La Jolla, CA., where he studied the role of retroviruses in causing lymphomas in mice. In 1976 he returned to the University of Nijmegen where he became junior staff member. His group explored proviral insertional mutagenesis as a means to identify new oncogenes. In 1985 he was appointed as staff scientist at the Netherlands Cancer Institute and in 1986 he became head of the Division of Molecular Genetics of the institute. Here his group did pioneering work to generate and utilize genetically modified mice as a tool to search for new cancer genes.

Berns was elected a member of the European Molecular Biology Organization in 1989. He served on its council from 2005 to 2007 and again from 2008 to 2010. He was its Secretary General from 2010 to 2012.

Berns was elected a member of the Royal Netherlands Academy of Arts and Sciences in 1997. He was elected a member of Academia Europaea in 1999.

In 1999, he was appointed as Director of Research and chairman of the Board of Directors of the Netherlands Cancer Institute/Antoni van Leeuwenhoek Hospital from which he retired at the end of 2011.

He continued his research as a group leader in the Division of Molecular Genetics of the NKI.

On 3 June 2013, Anton Berns was approved by the Skolkovo Institute of Science and Technology Board of Trustees as the director for the Centers for Research, Education and Innovation (CREI) that are established to promote partnerships between Russian and non-Russian researchers.

In 2016 he was elected as a foreign associate of the National Academy of Sciences.

He is a member of the editorial board for Genes & Development.

== Research interest ==
=== Mouse Cancer Models ===
The aim is to utilize genetically engineered mouse models to define the genetic and epigenetic lesions involved in tumor initiation, progression, metastasis and tumor maintenance. These models are particularly suited to design and evaluate new intervention strategies.

=== Inducible mouse models ===
Anton Berns' research group has a significant investment in developing new mouse models for a variety of tumors, using Cre/Lox mediated switching of tumor suppressor genes and oncogenes. Both transgenesis and somatic gene transfer are employed to express Cre recombinase and other genes or shRNAs in a regulatable fashion. They have managed to switch multiple oncogenes and/or tumor suppressor genes within cells in vivo at a defined time and to monitor the relevance of these genes for tumor initiation and progression. The induction of highly specific tumors within a narrow time window permits us to correlate specific genetic lesions with distinct tumor characteristics. The general picture that transpires from these studies is that the mouse cancer models show closer resemblance to the human condition when they share the same mutations.

By applying sensitive in vivo imaging techniques to follow tumor growth and metastatic spread in real time in animals the researchers not only can follow tumor development longitudinally but also monitor response to genetic and pharmacological interventions.

== Current research ==
Currently, his group focuses on the development and use of advanced mouse models for cancer. Themes of his current research are:

1. Development of tools to faster generate complex mouse models,
2. High throughput transposon insertional mutagenesis to identify components in signaling pathways relevant for cancer,
3. The role of tumor heterogeneity and cells-of-origin of lung cancer and mesothelioma.

His group consists of approximately 12 members including 4 technicians.
