= Loci Communes (Antonius Melissa) =

11th-century collection of sententiae

Loci Communes is a compilation of sententiae or moral sentences written by Greek monk Antonius Melissa (c. 11th century). It is similar to another Loci communes, by an anonymous author and misattributed to Maximus Confessor. Both works contain extracts from the early Church Fathers, and also contain quotations from earlier Jewish and pagan authors. The two works have often been printed together, and have often been printed at the end of the editions of Stobaeus.

Nothing is known about the author. The surname traditionally applied to Antonius, Melissa ("the Bee"), seems to have been, in fact, the original title of his compilation.
