= Theus (surname) =

Theus is a surname. Notable people with the name include:

- Darius Theus (born 1990), American professional basketball player
- Jeremiah Theus (sometimes Jeremiah Theüs) (1716–74), Swiss-born American painter
- John Theus (born 1994), American football offensive tackle
- Kerly Theus (born 1999), Haitian professional soccer player
- Lucius Theus (1922–2007), Major General in the United States Air Force
- Reggie Theus (born 1957), American basketball player and head coach

== See also ==
- Theuns
