= Sonny Waaldijk =

Dutch basketball player

Personal information
- Born: 30 June 1990 (age 36) Utrecht, Netherlands
- Listed height: 1.85 m (6 ft 1 in)
- Position: Shooting guard
- Number: 4, 5, 14

Career history
- 2009–2010: EiffelTowers Den Bosch
- 2010–2011: De Friesland Aris

Sonny Waaldijk (born 30 June 1990, in Utrecht) is a former Dutch professional basketball player who played for Dutch Basketball League clubs EiffelTowers Den Bosch and Aris Leeuwarden during the 2009–2011 seasons.
