= Alijt Bake =

Alijt Bake (born 1415 in Utrecht, died 1455 in Ghent), was a nun and writer, prioress of the Galilea convent in Ghent, Belgium. Among her writings is a spiritual autobiography containing accounts of encounters with Christ.

Bake joined the Galilea convent in 1438. The Augustinian convent was founded in 1431, and joined the Congregation of Windesheim in 1438. When she joined, she was 23 and already experienced enough to have run-ins with the prioress, Hilde Sonterlants, whom she referred to as "Mater Hildegont". She took her vows in 1440, and when Sonterlants died in 1445, Bake was elected to succeed her.

Bake's first challenge was how to reinvigorate and reform the convent life. She considered joining the Bethlehem convent in Ghent, which belonged to the Poor Clares and had flourished under the leadership of Coleta von Corbie, but in the end decided to stay and attempt to renew life at Galilea.

The leadership of her congregation deposed and banished her in 1455.

Her De vier kruiswegen, one of many women's texts produced during the Devotio Moderna movement, proposes an Imitatio Christi; the intellect, in the form of believer's soul, will be united with God, while nature, as the believer's body, will be united with the body of Christ.

Her autobiography is held in the State Archive of Ghent.
