= Antoine de Mouchy =

French theologian

Antoine de Mouchy (Antonius Monchiacenus Demochares) (1494 – 8 May 1574) was a French theologian and canonist, at Paris.

A traditional explanation of the French term mouchard, meaning police spy or informer, is that it derived from his use of intelligence-gathering networks, when working as an inquisitor. This folk-etymology was adopted by Voltaire, following François-Eudes de Mézeray. It has been plausibly contested, on the grounds that the word is found used in the fifteenth century.

== Life ==
De Mouchy was born at Ressons-sur-Matz, near Beauvais, in Picardy. In 1539 he was appointed rector of the University of Paris. He was also professor at the Sorbonne and canon Penitentiarius of Noyon. He was one of a group of Sorbonne doctors who in the 1550s began detailed scholarship on lists of bishops, to support the apostolic succession.

As inquisitor fidei he exerted his influence against the Calvinists, and was a judge at the heresy trial of Anne du Bourg. In a 1560 book he accused Calvinists of sexual libertinism, practiced after the end of religious services.

In 1562 he accompanied Charles, Cardinal of Lorraine to the Council of Trent, and in 1564 was present at the Synod of Reims.

== Works ==
Mouchy wrote a work in defence of the Mass (Paris, 1562). His scholarly edition of the Corpus juris canonici is called "pioneering".
