= Antonius Galli =

- Born: c. 1505; Flanders
- Died: 1565
- Occupation: Composer

Antonius Galli (c. 1505 - Vienna, 2 April 1565) was a Franco-Flemish composer at the court of Maximilian II.

Galli was born in Flanders. In 1545 he was appointed as choirmaster at St. Donatian in Bruges. Before he held this position, he had a similar one at St. Saviour in the same city. However, in 1550 he was dismissed due to negligence in the care and instruction of the church's choirboys. Later on he entered the service of Maximilian II of Austria, whom he served as a chaplain. It's not known at what time he held this position, but he is listed in the court register of 1 January 1554.

Galli's Missa Ascendetis post filium, based on Vaet's motet, was recorded by the vocal group Cinquecento.
