= Antoine van Zyll =

- Born: Utrecht, Netherlands
- Died: 1655
- Occupations: Remonstrant theologian, pastor
- Known for: Latin poetry, translation of Libri tres de resurrectione mortuorum by Manasseh Ben Israel

Antoine van Zyll, born in Utrecht, died in 1655, was a Remonstrant theologian and pastor in Alkmaar. He is mentioned in the Parnassus Latino-Belgicus by Hoeufft. This scholar possessed unpublished Latin poems by van Zyll, written between 1604 and 1652, among which is an epigram titled In tractatum Manassis - Ben-Israël de resurrectione mortuorum, a me ex hispano latine redditum (1636). This suggests that the Libri tres de resurrectione mortuorum by Manasseh Ben Israel, published in Latin in Amsterdam in 1636, was originally written in Spanish and translated into Latin by Antoine van Zyll.

== Sources ==
- Michaud, Louis-Gabriel (1843–1865). "Antoine Van Zyll". Biographie universelle ancienne et moderne: histoire par ordre alphabétique de la vie publique et privée de tous les hommes avec la collaboration de plus de 300 savants et littérateurs français ou étrangers (2nd ed.).
- van der Meer, Willemina, ed. (1991). Biografische Index van de Benelux (in Dutch). Walter de Gruyter. p. 1603. ISBN 978-3-11-097714-1.
