= Teunis Sprong =

Dutch long-distance runner

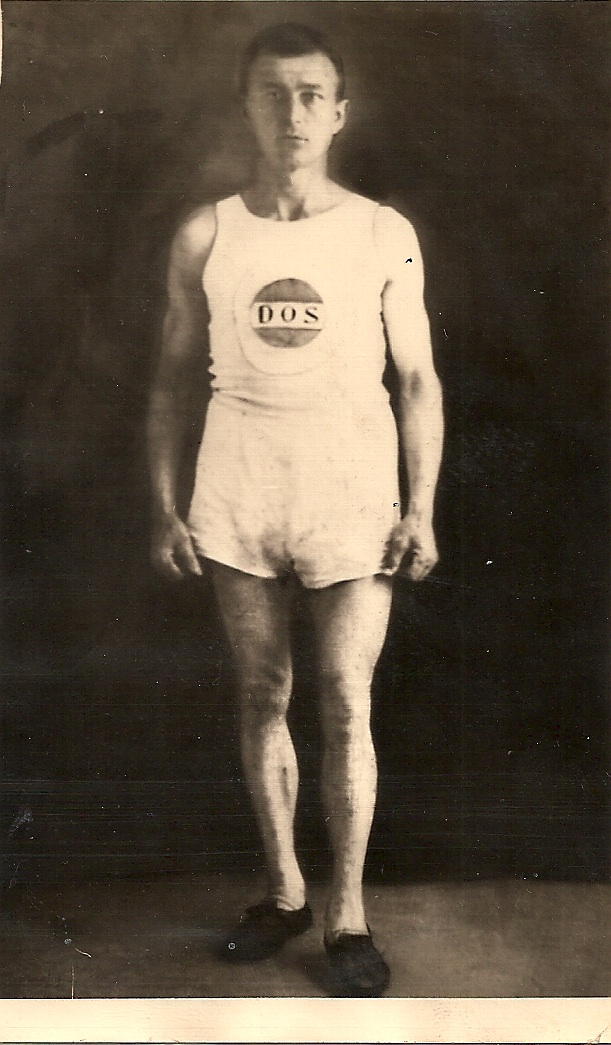

Personal information
- Nationality: Dutch
- Born: 16 February 1889 Rotterdam, Netherlands
- Died: 21 January 1971 (aged 81) Rotterdam, Netherlands

Sport
- Sport: Long-distance running
- Event: Marathon

Teunis Sprong (16 February 1889 – 21 January 1971) was a Dutch long-distance runner. He competed in the marathon at the 1924 and 1928 Summer Olympics, but both times he did not finish.
