= Antonius Wyngaerde =

Antonius Wyngaerde (died 1499) was a composer associated with the city of Antwerp. He was born in Utrecht. He gained some reputation for his contrapuntal ability.
