= Jan Theuns =

Dutch painter

Jan Theuns (1877–1961). Dutch painter born in 1877 in Breda (Netherlands) and well known as a landscape and portrait painter.

Theuns studied at the Ambachtsschool and was trained as a decorator. Early on re-known romantic painter Karel Frans Phillippeau (1825–1897) saw that the young Theuns had talent and encouraged him to take drawing lessons which he did at the Avondtekenschool in Breda.

Theuns was an accomplished painter of landscapes, interiors and rural peasant scenes in the romantic style of many of late 19th century painters (for example “Oosterschelde oever bij Bergen op Zoom, genaamd De Duintjes” Oil paint on board 1925-1950, Inv.nr. S 5783 Bruikleen Stichting Stedelijk Museum Breda).

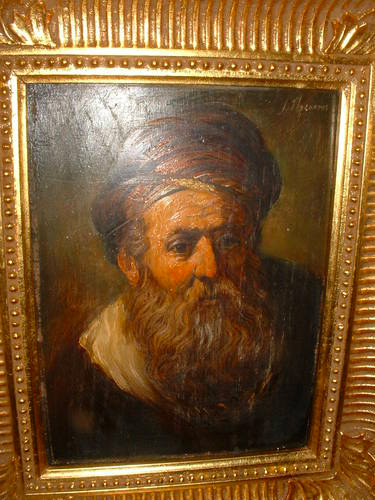
Oriental figure (Rabbi) by Jan Theuns

Jan Theuns was fascinated by the work of Rembrandt, Rubens and van Dyck. He studied their paintings at different museums in Antwerp and Rotterdam, and The Hague and even the Rijksmuseum in Amsterdam. He mastered the technique, color and composition of the 17th century artists. He often imitated Rembrandt's portraits with such a dexterity that earned him the nickname of “Breda's Rembrandt.” These skills accidentally got him into trouble with the law in 1927 when Theuns was involved in a scandal.

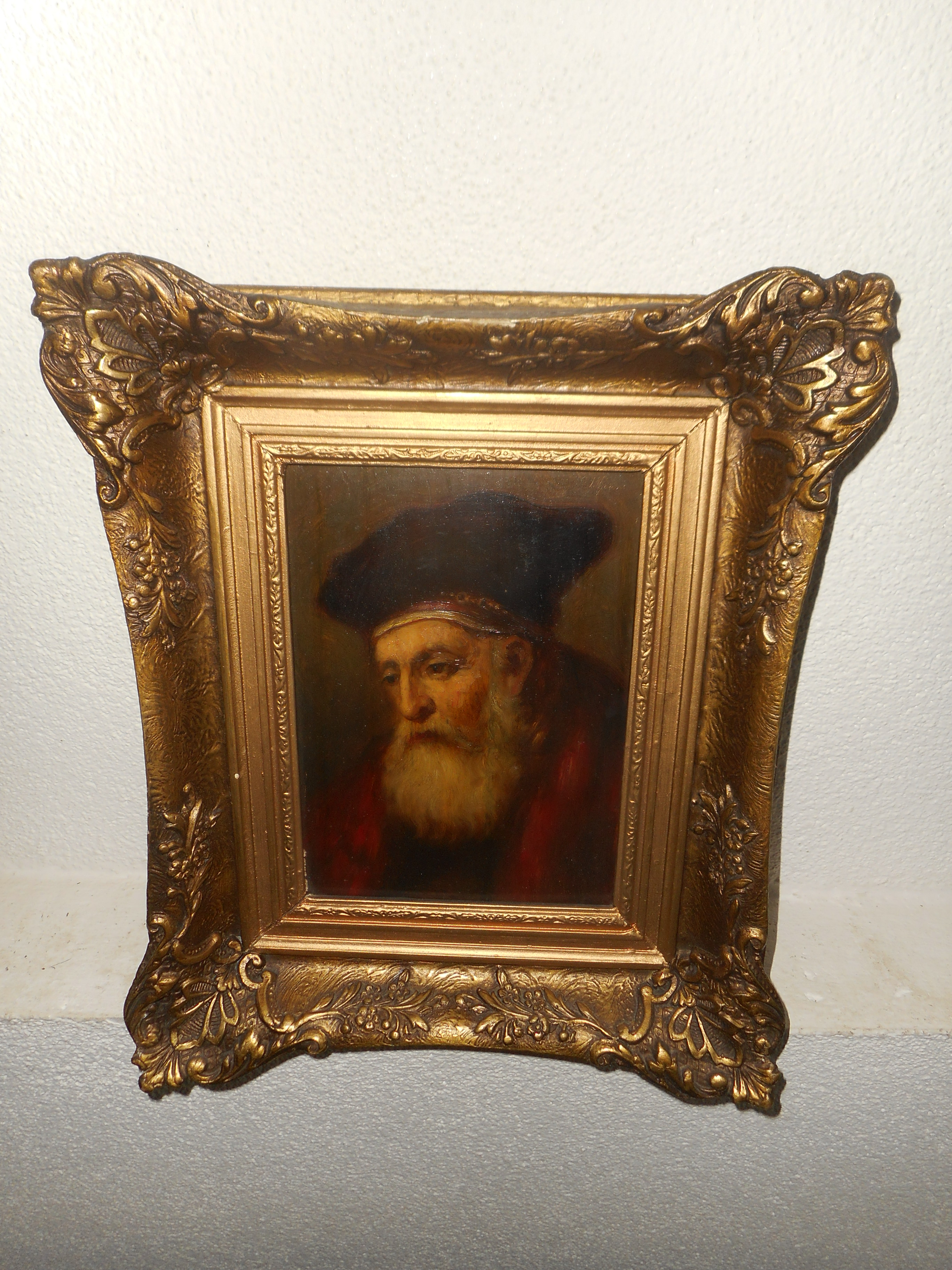
Jan Theuns "Рембрант"

In 1909 Mr. Duynstee, an antique collector from Delft, bought in Breda for 10 guilders the painting of an old rabbi (similar to Rembrandt's "Portrait of Jacob Trip" c. 1661, held by the National Gallery, London). Eighteen years later, Mr. Duynstee sold it for 70,000 guilders as a Rembrandt. The cleaning of the painting and later a technical investigation by authoritative Rembrandt scholars Dr. Abraham Bredius and Caspar Niehaus revealed that “The rabbi” was not an original despite its striking similarity to Rembrandt's work and a mysterious forged signature now appearing in the painting. Jan Theuns alleged that he never sold the painting as a Rembrandt, that he sold it for a small amount of money, and that someone else added the forged signature to his work. Theuns never signed these early “Rembrandts” and only did so after the scandal. He was not a criminal master forger (this is an intentional malicious one) as his famous contemporary Han van Meegeren, just a mater copyist. Jan Theuns maintained his innocence until his death in 1961 but this affair followed him throughout his life and made him world-famous–especially post-war--- as Rembrandt copyist. Such notoriety translated into many commissions of these “Rembrandt-heads” as he called them (according to his daughter Diny Ladner). Everywhere there were customers for such work. Theuns reputation reached from Cape Town to Rio de Janeiro. He continued to copy and imitate Rembrandt (and other 17th century painters) but since his copies were really difficult to distinguish from the originals he decided to sign them J. Theuns.

The Princenhage Museum exhibited in 2007 forty fake Rembrandt by Theuns from private collections around the world.

Theuns died in 1961.
