= Antonov (surname) =

Antonov is a masculine Russian surname that is derived from the male given name Anton and literally means Anton's. I.e., it is a patronymic surname derived from the Antonius root name. Its feminine counterpart is Antonova. It may refer to:

- Aleksandr Antonov (disambiguation), several people
- Aleksei Antonov (1896–1962), Soviet Army general
- Anatoly Antonov (born 1955), Russian diplomat
- Dmytro Antonov (born 1996), Ukrainian footballer
- Oleg Antonov, multiple people
- Sergei Antonov (1948–2007), Bulgarian accused of involvement in attempt by Mehmet Ali Ağca to kill Pope John Paul II
- Vadim Antonov (born 1965), Russian/American software engineer and entrepreneur
- Vladimir Antonov (disambiguation), several people
- Vladimir Antonov-Ovseyenko (1883–1939), Soviet statesman and party figure
- Yuri Antonov, Soviet and Russian composer, singer and musician

== See also ==
- Antonov (disambiguation)
- Anton (disambiguation)
- Antona, a genus of moths
- Antono (name)
- Antonov
- Antonova
- Antonovna
- Antonovca (disambiguation)
- Antonovka
