= Antonova =

Antonova is a feminine Russian surname that as the female version of Antonov is derived from the male given name Anton and literally means Anton's. I.e., it is a patronymic surname derived from the Antonius root name. It may refer to:

- Aleksandra Antonova (hurdler) (born 1980), Russian hurdler
- Aleksandra Andreevna Antonova (1932–2014), Russian, Kildin Sámi teacher, writer, poet, translator
- Aleksandra Antonova (water polo) (born 1991), Russian water polo player
- Anastasia Oberstolz-Antonova (born 1981), Soviet/Russian-born, Italian luger
- Anna Antonova (born 1965), Soviet figure skater
- Diana Antonova (born 1993), Russian water polo player
- Elena Antonova (skier) (born 1971), Kazak cross-country skier
- Irina Antonova (1922–2020), the Director of the Pushkin Museum of Fine Arts in Moscow for 52 years, from 1961 to 2013
- Koka Antonova (1910–2007), Soviet Indologist
- Ksenia Antonova (born 1990), Russian ice dancer
- Natalia Antonova (born 1995), Russian cyclist
- Natalya Antonova, Russian pianist
- Olena Antonova (born 1972), Ukrainian discus thrower
- Olga Antonova (athlete) (born 1960), Soviet sprint athlete
- Svetlana Antonova (born 1979), Russian actress
- Yelena Antonova (cyclist), Kazakhstani cyclist
- Yelena Antonova (rower) (born 1952), Soviet rower
- Yelena Antonova (synchronised swimmer) (born 1974), Russian swimmer

== See also ==
- Andonova
- Antonov (surname)
- Antonovna
