= Clan =

Group of people united by actual or perceived kinship and descent

A clan is a group of people united by actual or perceived kinship and descent. Even if lineage details remain unknown or non-specific, clan members may claim descent from a founding individual or apical ancestor who serves as a symbol of the clan's unity. (Note: In a Taiwanese example, for instance: Lazzarotti, Marco (17 July 2020). "5.2.2: Chinese Kinship and the Importance of Ancestors' Rites". Place, Alterity, and Narration in a Taiwanese Catholic Village. Asian Christianity in the Diaspora. Cham, Zug: Springer Nature. p. 107. doi:10.1007/978-3-030-43461-8. ISBN 9783030434618. "A lineage is an organized group of descendants of a single, specific ancestor. The ancestor is referred to as an "apical" ancestor because he is at the 'apex' of the genealogy by which the lineage membership is determined, and the descent links to this person are known (or written in a genealogy where they can be looked up). A clan is a property-holding group made up of descendants of an apical ancestor, but the details of the descent lines from that ancestor are unknown. In some cases the apical ancestor is clearly mythical, and in some societies the apical ancestor may even be non-human.") Many societies' exogamy rules are on a clan basis, where all members of one's own clan, or the clans of both parents or even grandparents, are excluded from marriage as incest.

Clan members may identify with a coat of arms or other symbol. Some kinship-based groups may also have a symbol of origin, whereby the clan shares a "stipulated" common ancestor serving as a symbol of the clan's unity. Traditional anthropological thought (as for example in the work of Gerardus van der Leeuw) classified non-human examples of such "ancestors" (frequently animals) as totems.

== Etymology ==
The word "clan" is derived from the Gaelic word clann meaning "children", "offspring", "progeny" or "descendants". According to the Oxford English Dictionary, the word "clan" was introduced into English in around 1406, as a descriptive label for the organization of society in the Scottish Highlands.

None of the Irish and Scottish Gaelic terms for kinship groups is cognate to English clan; Irish and Scottish Gaelic clann means "children":

- fine [ˈfʲɪnʲə] means (English) "clan"
- teaghlach means "family" in the sense of the nuclear family, or can include more distant relatives living in the same house
- líon tí means either "family" in the sense of "household", or everyone who lives in the house, including non-relatives
- muintir means "family" in the broad sense of "kinsfolk"

== Clans as political units ==
In different cultures and situations, a clan usually has different meaning than other kin-based groups, such as tribes and bands. Often, the distinguishing factor is that a clan is a smaller, integral part of a larger society such as a tribe, chiefdom, or a state. In some societies, clans may have an official leader such as a chief, matriarch or patriarch; or such leadership role is performed by elders. In others, leadership positions may have to be achieved.

Examples include Irish, Scottish, Chinese, Korean, and Japanese clans, which exist as distinct social groupings within their respective nations. Note, however, that tribes and bands can also be components of larger societies. The early Norse clans, the ætter, are often translated as "house" or "line". The Biblical tribes of Israel were composed of many clans. Arab clans are sub-tribal groups within Arab society. Native American and First Nations peoples, often referred to as "tribes", also have clans. For instance, Ojibwa bands are smaller parts of the Ojibwa people or tribe in North America. The many Native American peoples are distinguished by language and culture, and most have clans and bands as the basic kinship organizations. In some cases tribes recognized each other's clans; for instance, both the Chickasaw and Choctaw tribes of the Southeast United States had fox and bear clans, who felt a kinship that reached beyond their respective tribes.

Apart from these different historical traditions of kinship, conceptual confusion arises from colloquial usages of the term. In post-Soviet countries, for example, it is quite common to speak of "clans" in reference to informal networks within the economic and political sphere. This usage reflects the assumption that their members act towards each other in a particularly close and mutually supportive way, approximating the solidarity among kinsmen. Similar usage of the term applies to specific groups of various cultures and nationalities involved in organized crime. Polish clans differ from most others as they are a collection of families who bear the same coat of arms, as opposed to claiming a common descent (see Polish heraldry). There are multiple closely related clans in the Indian subcontinent, especially South India.

Romani people have many clans which are called vitsa in Romani.

=== Scottish Clans ===
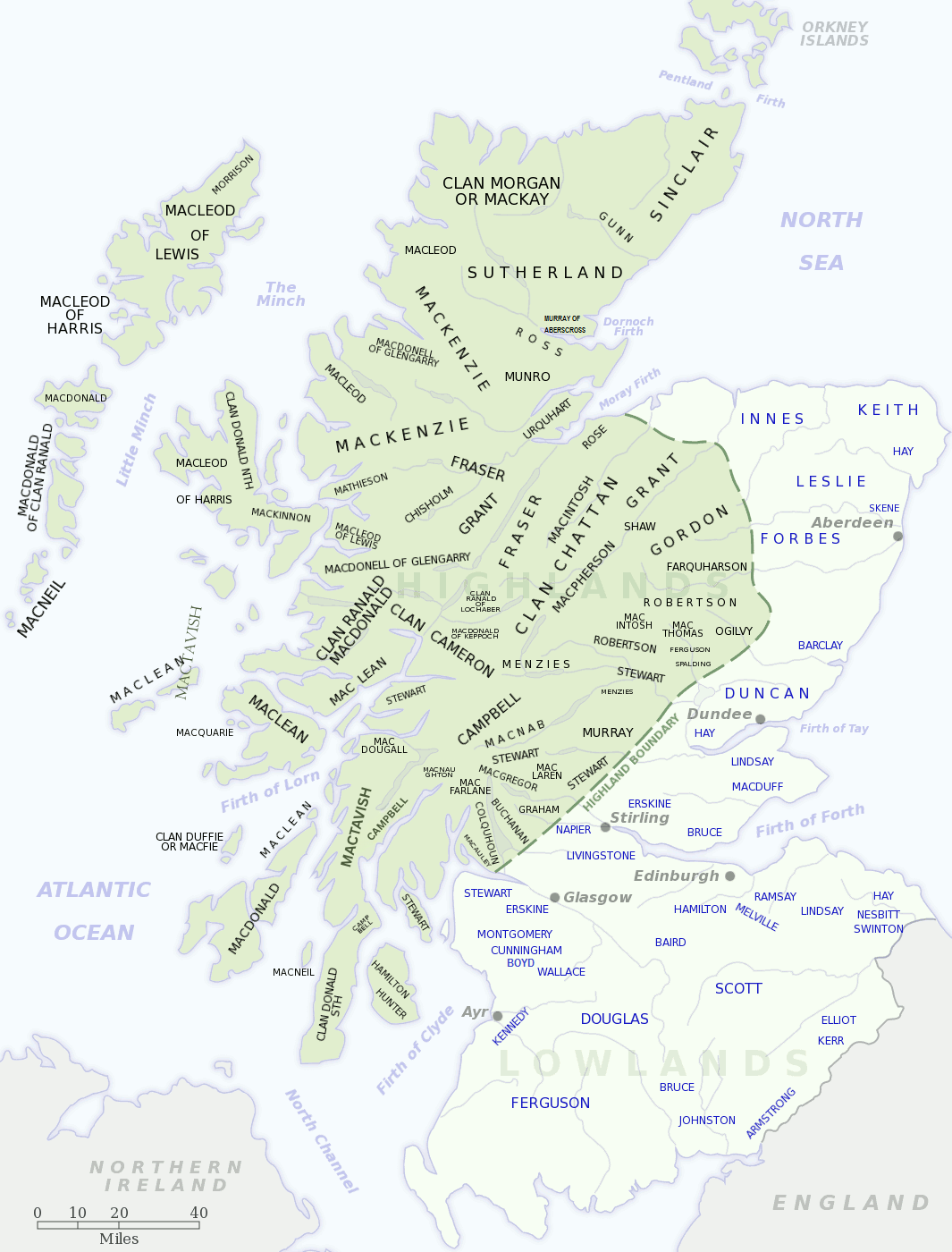
Map of Scottish Highland clans and lowland families

Scottish clans are social groupings that have played a pivotal role in the history and culture of Scotland. Unlike some other clans that focus solely on common descent or a shared coat of arms, Scottish clans are unique in their elaborate systems of tartans, insignias, and mottos. Clan culture in Scotland also extends to community events such as clan gatherings and Highland Games. Each clan may have an official leader known as a "Chieftain" or "Chief."

Members of Scottish clans often have a shared interest in preserving their historical and cultural landmarks, as well as the natural environment and wildlife of Scotland. The clan system in Scotland has also been influenced by key historical events like the Highland Clearances and the Jacobite uprisings, which have left lasting impacts on clan structures and Scottish diaspora.

=== Irish Clans ===
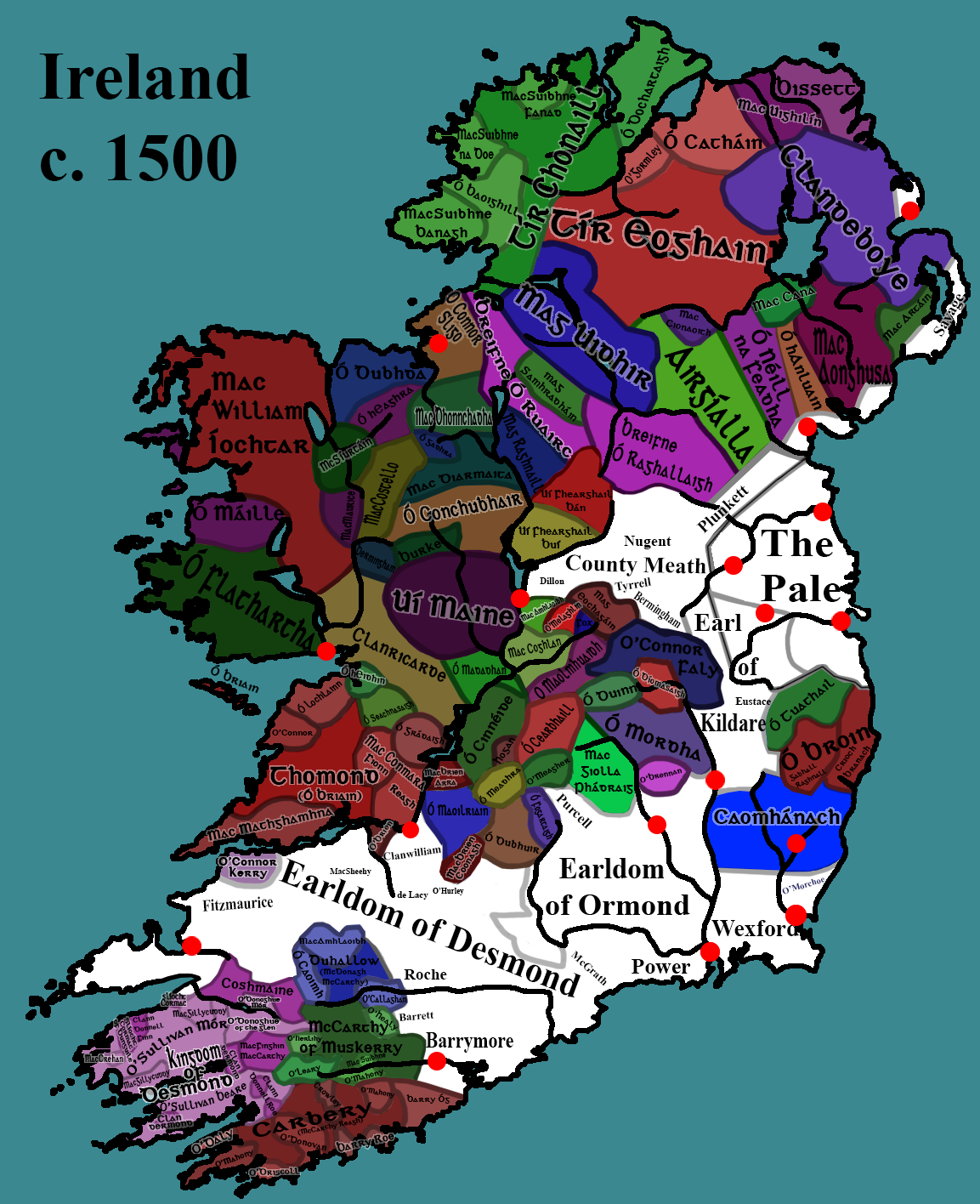
Ireland c. 1500 at the beginning of the Tudor Conquest

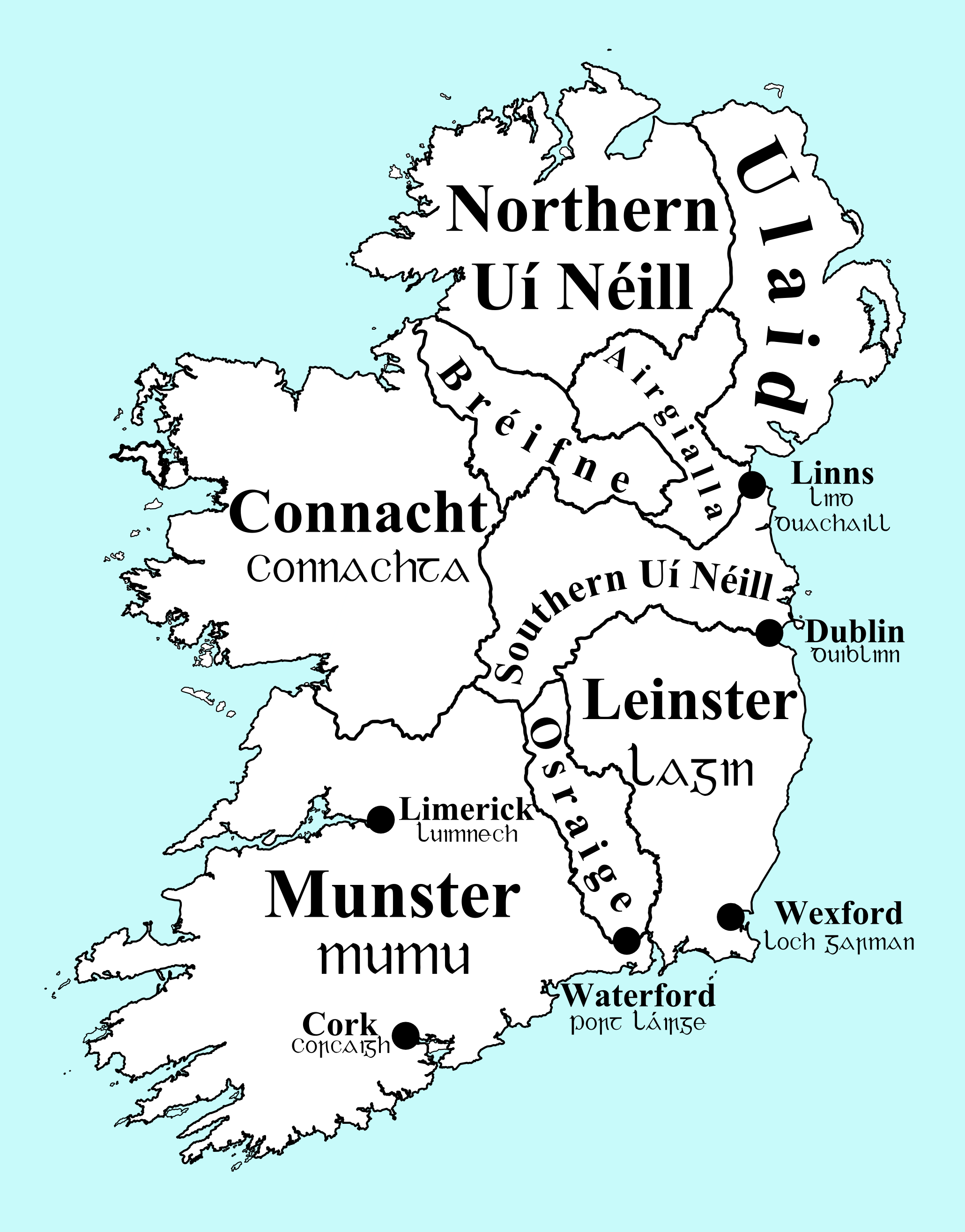
Ireland about the year 900

Irish Clans are social and kinship groups sharing a common surname and heritage and existing in a lineage based society. A clan (or fine in Irish) included the chief and his patrilineal relatives as well as unrelated clients of the chief. Unrelated clients and their descendants were ineligible to be elected chief, but nonetheless assumed the name of the leading lineage to show allegiance. Irish clans traditionally bore unifying cultural markers, such as common surnames, banners and heraldic arms, mottoes or war-cries, occupations, social rank, religious affiliation, and political, legal, or military action.

=== Clannism ===
Clannism (in Somali culture, qabiilism) is a system of society based on clan affiliation.

The Islamic world, the Near East, North and the Horn of Africa in general, and Somali culture specifically, is patriarchal and traditionally centered on patrilineal clans or tribes.

=== African ===
In the African Great Lakes region, the clan is a unit of social organisation. It is the oldest societal structure in the region, other than family and direct lineage. The structure is found in modern-day Rwanda, Burundi, Tanzania and Uganda.

The term clan was first used in the nineteenth century by Europeans, due to the similarities to other clan systems found across the world. The people of the area use a variety of vernacular terms to describe the concept: ubwoko in Rwanda, umuryango in Burundi, ruganda in the Bunyoro and Buhaya kingdoms, igise in Buha, ishanja in Buhavu and ebika in Buganda.

Clans differ somewhat in their nature from country to country: in Rwanda the clan is a very structured unit, with twenty in total, themselves divided into subclans. The same holds in Nkore, which has only four clans.

=== Matriclans ===
In a number of societies that have clans, clan membership is passed down matrilineally. These are sometimes known as matriclans. Peoples such as the Serer, Haudenosaunee, Akan, Minangkabau and Ejagham follow this matrilineal clan system.

== Clans by continent or region ==
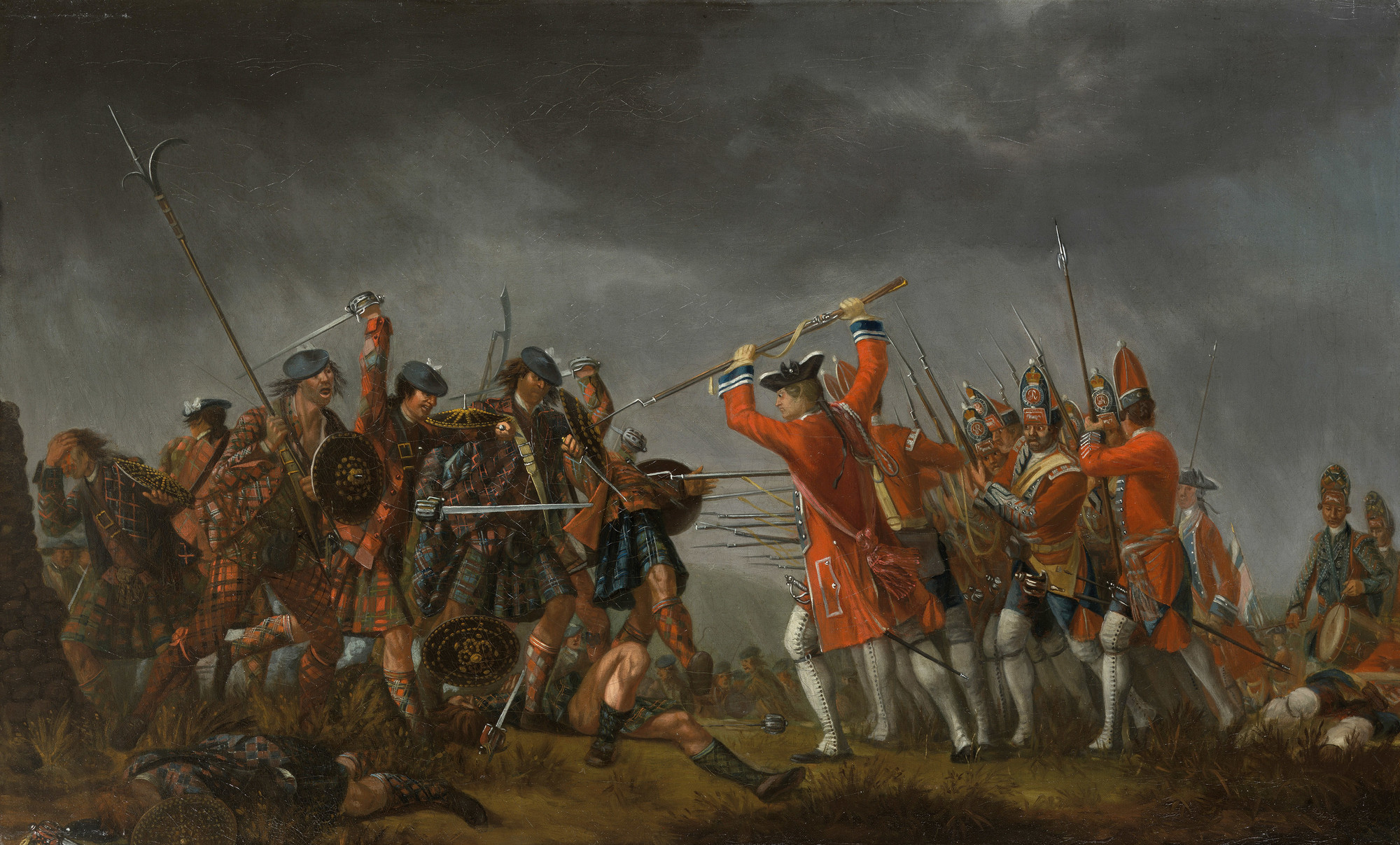
The Battle of Culloden of 1746, where British troops defeated the army of Scottish clansmen

Africa	Diarra (Jara); Habesha; Great Lakes; Serer clans (Serer maternal clans, Guelowar, Joos, Njuufeen, Fayeen); Kalenjin ortinuek; Somali clans; Tswana people; Clans of the Baganda
Americas	Anishinaabe; Cherokee; Haudenosaunee; Muscogee; Navajo; Omaha
Asia	Central Asian; Baloch; Ao Naga; Angami Naga; Bon-gwan (Korean names); Chinese (family name); Japanese; Luwang; Mangang; Punti; Khuman Salai; Angom; Moilang; Kha Nganpa; Salai Leishangthem; Kazakh; Manchu (names); Minangkabau (names); Mongolian; Ngoche; Pashtun
South Asia	Ahir; Arain; Bania; Bhuiyar; Bunt; Chero; Gakhars; Gotra; Gurjar (Gujjar); Dhangar (Gadariya); Jatav; Jat; Khatri; Kshatriya; Chowdary; Reddy; Maratha; Meena; Mukkulathor; Nai; Nair; Patidar; Paraiyar; Rajput; Sengunthar; Tarkhan; Vellalar; Yadav
Middle East	Arab; Israelite; Parthian; Kurdish; Syriac
Eurasia^{a}	Armenian; Bashkir, Chechen, Lezgin; Turkish; Russian; Yeraz
Europe	Spanish nobles; Irish; Irish and Scottish septs; Brussels; Irish and Scottish Chiefs of the Name; Norse; Polish; Scottish (Scottish clan chief); Armigerous; Albanian; Montenegrin; German nobles; French nobles
Oceania	Rapa Nui; Māori

^{a} Meaning the transcontinental area between Asia and Europe.

== See also ==
- Feud
- Caste
- Gotra system in India
- Clan (video gaming)
- Endogamy
- Extended family
- Uradel
