= Andonov =

Andonov (feminine Andonova) is a Bulgarian and Macedonian surname. Notable people with the surname include:

- Alyosha Andonov (born 1961), Bulgarian football head coach
- Atanas Andonov (born 1955), Bulgarian retired male decathlete
- Bobi Andonov (born 1994), Australian-Macedonian singer, songwriter and record producer
- Dalibor Andonov Gru (born 1973), Serbian musician
- Dimitar Andonov, Bulgarian officer and revolutionary, a leader of IMARO revolutionary band
- Dimitar Andonov (footballer) (born 1987), Bulgarian footballer
- Georgi Andonov (born 1983), Bulgarian footballer
- Hristo Andonov (1887–1928), Bulgarian revolutionary, a leader of IMARO and IMRO revolutionary bands
- Ivan Andonov (1934–2011), Bulgarian film director and actor
- Ivaylo Andonov (born 1967), retired Bulgarian footballer
- Kiril Andonov (born 1967), retired Bulgarian football player
- Lyudmila Andonova (born 1960), Bulgarian high jump athlete
- Malena Andonova (born 1957), Bulgarian sprint athlete
- Metodi Andonov (1932–1974), Bulgarian film director
- Metodija Andonov-Čento (1902–1957), Macedonian statesman and first president after the Second World War
- Milena Andonova (born 1959), Bulgarian screenwriter and film director
- Nataša Andonova (born 1993), Macedonian footballer
- Sijce Andonova (born 1992), Macedonian football
- Stanimir Andonov (born 1989), Bulgarian football player

== See also ==
- Andon (disambiguation)
- Andronov
- Andronovka
