= Klara Ashrafyan =

Armenian indologist (1924–1999)

Klara Z. Ashrafyan
- Кла́ра Зарма́йровна Ашрафя́н
- Born: 15 September 1924; Yerevan, Armenia
- Died: 7 August 1999 (aged 74); Moscow
- Citizenship: Soviet
- Education: Moscow State University
- Scientific career
- Fields: Medieval History of India
- Workplaces: Institute of Oriental Studies of the Russian Academy of Sciences
- Doctoral advisor: B.N. Zakhoder
- Doctoral students: Eugenia Vanina

Klara Zarmairovna Ashrafyan (Russian: Кла́ра Зарма́йровна Ашрафя́н; 15 September 1924 — 7 August 1999) was a Soviet Indologist of Armenian origin. She was known for her researches into the Delhi Sultanate and the Mughal Empire.

== Life and career ==
Ashrafyan was born in Yerevan, Armenian Soviet Socialist Republic, to Zarmair Ashrafyan, one of the founders of the Armenian Communist Party. In 1936, he and his wife were denounced, arrested and executed. The orphaned Klara was adopted by relatives in Moscow. Despite being tarnished as a family member of a traitor to the Motherland, she was allowed to study at the Faculty of History, Moscow State University, where she graduated in 1947. She specialised in the history of medieval Iran under B.N. Zakhoder, obtaining her Candidate of Sciences degree in 1950 with a dissertation on the period of the rule of Nadir Shah.

Between 1950 and 1955, she worked as an editor of the bulletin of foreign literature at the Fundamental Library of Social Sciences, succeeding Koka Antonova. Persuaded by Antonova and I.M. Reisner to change her field of study, she shifted to researching the Islamic states of medieval India, where her knowledge of Persian was useful. From 1955 to her death, she worked at the Institute of Oriental Studies of the Russian Academy of Sciences.

In 1984, the Institute decided to organise a multi-volume collective set of works on the History of the Orient. Ashrafyan was tasked with heading a section on the peoples of the east. She edited volumes II and III of the set.

Ashrafyan died in Moscow on 7 August 1999.

=== Academics ===
Ashrafyan's first monograph, published in 1960, was titled The Delhi Sultanate, covering the political development and social and economic basis for the first Islamic dominions in North India. This was the first publication on the subject in the Soviet Union.

Her research primarily investigated land ownership and the socio-economic framework of Indo-Muslim states. Aligned with Soviet economic theories of progressive historical evolution, she classified 13th-century private land holdings as feudal tenure. According to her analysis, this system was subsequently replaced by the ruling class's military organization, leading to state land ownership and the economic subjugation of the peasantry. She argued that private ownership in India evolved gradually through the coercion of producers, meaning that essential prerequisites for modern production relations had already developed within the country's agricultural system prior to the British occupation. Whereas some scholars claimed that the rise and fall of dominions in India were essentially manifestations of a static socio-economic structure, with state power changing hands and not facing any social conflicts or subaltern revolts, Ashrafyan contended that by the late medieval period, there were peasant uprisings against Mughal rule, chiefly caused by wealthy agriculturalists wanting a larger share of the revenue and power. Specifically, she posited two distinct stages of Indian feudalism: an early phase extending up to the 13th century, and a developed phase lasting until the 18th century. In the initial phase, a strict hierarchical class structure emerged, subjugating the peasantry and merchant classes beneath a new ruling elite. During the later phase, popular social movements partially disrupted this hierarchy. However, she concluded that Indian feudalism ultimately failed to evolve sufficiently to transition into a capitalist stage of development. This thesis was criticised as dubious, especially for the pan-Indian nature of the argument, whereas other researchers had shown that in the South, taxpayers were not necessarily peasants and in any case owned property.

In her analysis of the change of socio-economic structures, Ashrafyan (in keeping with the Soviet school of Indian studies) took an anti-religious stance, suggesting that movements such as Bhakti and Sikhism diluted social reform with religious garb, and that Akbar's Din-i Ilahi was a state counter to reduce their energy.

== Selected works ==
- Делийский султанат. К истории экономического строя и общественных отношений (XIII–XIV вв.) [The Delhi Sultanate]. 1960.
- Аграрный строй Северной Индии. XIII – сер. XVIII в. [The Agrarian System of the Northern India: 13th-mid-18th Century]. 1965.
- Феодализм в Индии: особенности и этапы развития [Feudalism in India]. 1977.
- Средневековый город Индии. XIII – сер. XVIII в. [Medieval City in India: 13th-mid-18th Century]. 1983.
- Дели: история и культура [Delhi: History and Culture]. 1987.

== Bibliography ==
- Alayev, L.B. (2013). Историография истории индии (PDF). Moscow. ISBN 978-5-89282-560-3.
- Kotovsky, G.G. (2000). "Памяти Клары Зармайровны Ашрафян". Vostok (1).
- Vanina, E. (1999). "Russian Studies in Medieval Indian History and Society: An Insider's View". The Medieval History Journal. 2 (2): 361–386. doi:10.1177/097194589900200207. S2CID 161289059.
- Vanina, E. (2005). "Ashrafyan". Great Russian Encyclopedia. Archived from the original on 2019-07-06.
