= 1998–99 Ukrainian First League =

Ukrainian First League
- Season: 1998–99
- Champions: Dynamo-2 Kyiv
- Promoted: Chornomorets Odesa
- Relegated: Podillya Khmelnytskyi, Kremin Kremenchuk, Bukovyna Chernivtsi, Desna Chernihiv, Shakhtar Makiivka
- Top goalscorer: (19) Oleh Hrytsay (FC Cherkasy)

1998–99 Ukrainian First League was the eighth season of the Ukrainian First League which was won by FC Dynamo-2 Kyiv. The season started on July 31, 1998, and finished on July 4, 1999.

== Promotion and relegation ==
=== Promoted teams ===
Two clubs promoted from the 1997-98 Ukrainian Second League through a promotion/relegation play-off tournament.

Group A

- FC Podillya Khmelnytskyi – champion (returning after a season)

Group C

- FC Shakhtar-2 Donetsk – champion (returning after six seasons)

=== Relegated teams ===
Two clubs were relegated from the 1997-98 Ukrainian Top League:

- FC Chornomorets Odesa – 15th place (debut)
- FC Torpedo Zaporizhia – 16th place (debut)

=== Renamed teams ===
- FC Nyva Vinnytsia changed its name to FC Vinnytsia at winter break.
- FC Yavir Krasnopillia moved to Sumy from Krasnopillia and changed its name to FC Yavir-Sumy at winter break.

=== Teams ===
Locations of teams in First League

Team	Stadium	Location
Chornomorets Odesa	Central Stadium ChMP	Odesa
Metalurh Nikopol	Stadium "Metalurh"	Nikopol
Torpedo Zaporizhia	Stadium of ME "AvtoZAZ–Daewoo"	Zaporizhia
Shakhtar-2 Donetsk	Stadium "Stalekanatchik"	Khartsyzk
Shakhtar-2 Donetsk	Stadium "Shakhtar"	Donetsk
Shakhtar-2 Donetsk	Stadium "Avanhard"	Makiivka
Dynamo-2 Kyiv	Stadium "DYuSSh"	Shchaslyve
Dynamo-2 Kyiv	Stadium "Dynamo"	Kyiv
Dynamo-2 Kyiv	Dynamo Training Center	Kyiv
Desna Chernihiv	Yuri Gagarin Stadium	Chernihiv
Stal Alchevsk	Stadium "Stal"	Alchevsk
Shakhtar Makiivka	Stadium "Avanhard"	Makiivka
Nyva Vinnytsia	Central City Stadium	Vinnytsia
Polissya Zhytomyr	Stadium "Polissia"	Zhytomyr
Polissya Zhytomyr	Central City Stadium	Zhytomyr
FC Lviv	Stadium "Yunist"	Lviv
Podillya Khmelnytskyi	Stadium "Podillia"	Khmelnytskyi
Volyn Lutsk	Stadium "Avanhard"	Lutsk
Yavir Krasnopillia	Stadium "Kolos"	Krasnopillya
Yavir Krasnopillia	Stadium "Avanhard"	Sumy
Naftovyk Okhtyrka	Stadium "Naftovyk"	Okhtyrka
Polihraftekhnika Oleksandriya	Stadium "Nika"	Oleksandriya
Kremin Kremenchuk	Stadium "Dnipro"	Kremenchuk
Kremin Kremenchuk	Stadium "Politekhnik"	Kremenchuk
CSKA-2 Kyiv	CSK ZSU Stadium	Kyiv
CSKA-2 Kyiv	Stadium "Metalist"	Kyiv
CSKA-2 Kyiv	Stadium "Kolos"	Boryspil
FC Cherkasy	Central Stadium	Cherkasy
Bukovyna Chernivtsi	Stadium "Bukovyna"	Chernivtsi

== Standings ==
Pos	Team	Pld	W	D	L	GF	GA	GD	Pts	Promotion or relegation
1	FC Dynamo-2 Kyiv (C)	38	27	7	4	78	27	+51	88	(Note: The second team of FC Dynamo Kyiv cannot be promoted as the club already has a representation in the Vyscha Liha.)
2	FC Chornomorets Odesa (P)	38	25	4	9	77	38	+39	79	Promoted to Vyshcha Liha
3	FC Torpedo Zaporizhia	38	24	5	9	55	29	+26	77	Bankruptcy (Note: FC Torpedo Zaporizhia filed for bankruptcy at the end of the season and therefore could not be promoted.)
4	FC Cherkasy	38	24	4	10	68	42	+26	76	Qualification for promotion play-off (Note: FC Cherkasy was offered to play a play-off game with the second worst team of Vyscha Liha, FC Prykarpattia Ivano-Frankivsk, because of Torpedo's bankruptcy and placing only the fourth place.)
5	FC Polihraftekhnika Oleksandria	38	15	13	10	47	51	−4	58	
6	FC Vinnytsia	38	16	9	13	45	39	+6	57	
7	FC Lviv	38	15	12	11	58	43	+15	57	
8	FC Naftovyk Okhtyrka	38	16	9	13	45	40	+5	57	
9	FC Stal Alchevsk	38	16	7	15	55	52	+3	55	
10	FC Shakhtar-2 Donetsk	38	15	7	16	51	44	+7	52	
11	CSKA-2 Kyiv	38	14	10	14	45	48	−3	52	
12	FC Polissya Zhytomyr	38	15	7	16	40	55	−15	52	
13	FC Yavir Sumy	38	15	7	16	36	42	−6	52	
14	FC Volyn Lutsk	38	16	3	19	36	43	−7	51	
15	FC Metalurh Nikopol	38	16	3	19	46	63	−17	51	
16	FC Podillya Khmelnytskyi (R)	38	13	12	13	39	42	−3	51	Relegated to Second League
17	FC Kremin Kremenchuk (R)	38	11	7	20	34	63	−29	40	Relegated to Second League
18	FC Bukovyna Chernivtsi (R)	38	6	9	23	26	68	−42	27	Relegated to Second League
19	FC Desna Chernihiv (R)	38	7	6	25	28	60	−32	27	Relegated to Second League
20	FC Shakhtar Makiivka (Note: After the first half of the competition the team was taken off due to the PFL membership debts. The team was fined of six competition points and in the second half was awarded technical losses.) (R)	38	3	1	34	20	40	−20	4	Withdrew

(C) Champions; (P) Promoted; (R) Relegated

== Promotion play-off ==
4 July 1999

Cherkasy	1 : 3	Prykarpattia Ivano-Frankivsk
Khursa 89'	Report	Larin 43', 46'; Skidan 70' (pen.)

Dynamo Stadium, Kyiv
Attendance: 6,000
Referee: Vadym Shevchenko, Kyiv

FC Cherkasy failed to obtain berth in the Top League.

== Top scorers ==
Statistics are taken from here.

	Scorer	Goals (Pen.)	Team
1	(Ukraine) Oleh Hrytsay	19 (1)	Cherkasy
2	(Ukraine) Oleksandr Kosyrin	18	Dynamo-2 Kyiv / Cherkasy
2	(Ukraine) Vadym Plotnykov	18 (2)	Stal Alchevsk
4	(Ukraine) Pavlo Irichuk	17	Torpedo Zaporizhzhia
5	(Ukraine) Oleh Venhlinskyi	16 (4)	Dynamo-2 Kyiv
6	(Ukraine) Oleksandr Holokolosov	15	Chornomorets Odesa
6	(Ukraine) Vadym Kharchenko	15 (6)	Naftovyk Okhtyrka
8	(Ukraine) Andriy Mazur	14	Lviv
8	(Ukraine) Rais Tyerkulov	14 (1)	Shakhtar Makiivka / Yavir Sumy
8	(Ukraine) Viktor Matsyuk	14 (2)	Podillya Khmelnytskyi

== See also ==
- 1998–99 Ukrainian Second League
- 1998–99 Ukrainian Premier League
