= 1997–98 Ukrainian First League =

Ukrainian First League
- Season: 1997–98
- Champions: SC Mykolaiv
- Promoted: SC Mykolaiv, Metalist Kharkiv
- Relegated: Zorya Luhansk, Verkhovyna Uzhhorod, Avanhard Rovenky, Khimik Severodonetsk
- Top goalscorer: (22) – Oleh Hrytsay FC Cherkasy and Hennadiy Skidan SC Mykolaiv

1997–98 Ukrainian First League was the seventh season of the Ukrainian First League which was won by SC Mykolaiv. The season started on July 30, 1997, and finished on July 9, 1998.

== Promotion and relegation ==
=== Promoted teams ===
Two clubs promoted from the 1996-97 Ukrainian Second League.

Group A

- FC Desna Chernihiv – champion (returning after three seasons)

Group B

- FC Avanhard-Industriya Rovenky – champion (debut)

=== Relegated teams ===
Two clubs were relegated from the 1996-97 Ukrainian Top League:

- FC Kremin Kremenchuk – 15th place (debut)
- FC Nyva Vinnytsia – 16th place (returning after four seasons)

=== Renamed teams ===
- FC Khimik Zhytomyr changed its name back to FC Polissya Zhytomyr.

=== Teams ===
In 1997-98 season, the Ukrainian First League consists of the following teams:

Locations of teams in First League

== Final standings ==
Pos	Team	Pld	W	D	L	GF	GA	GD	Pts	Promotion or relegation
1	SC Mykolaiv (C, P)	42	31	5	6	94	31	+63	98	Promoted to Vyshcha Liha
2	FC Dynamo-2 Kyiv	42	28	9	5	90	31	+59	93	
3	FC Metalist Kharkiv (P)	42	26	11	5	74	29	+45	89	Promoted to Vyshcha Liha
4	FC Stal Alchevsk	42	24	5	13	95	53	+42	77	
5	FC Nyva Vinnytsia	42	22	7	13	58	34	+24	73	
6	FC Polissya Zhytomyr	42	21	5	16	58	64	−6	68	
7	FC Cherkasy	42	19	11	12	51	41	+10	68	
8	FC Naftovyk Okhtyrka	42	19	10	13	56	50	+6	67	
9	FC Volyn Lutsk	42	19	8	15	56	45	+11	65	
10	FC Yavir Krasnopillia	42	19	5	18	52	48	+4	62	
11	FC Metalurh Nikopol	42	19	4	19	44	61	−17	61	
12	CSCA-2 Kyiv	42	18	5	19	56	44	+12	59	
13	FC Shakhtar Makiivka	42	17	5	20	65	77	−12	56	
14	FC Kremin Kremenchuk	42	16	7	19	55	53	+2	55	
15	FC Lviv	42	16	6	20	65	54	+11	54	
16	FC Polihraftekhnika Oleksandria	42	15	9	18	51	49	+2	54	
17	FC Desna Chernihiv	42	14	12	16	45	53	−8	54	
18	FC Bukovyna Chernivtsi (O)	42	14	11	17	36	50	−14	53	Qualification for relegation play-off
19	FC Zorya Luhansk (R)	42	11	6	25	43	84	−41	39	Relegated to Second League
20	FC Verkhovyna Uzhhorod (R)	42	7	11	24	42	79	−37	32	Relegated to Second League
21	FC Avanhard-Industria Rovenky (R)	42	4	4	34	15	107	−92	16	Relegated to Second League
22	FC Khimik Severodonetsk (D)	42	3	4	35	26	90	−64	13	withdrew

(C) Champions; (D) Disqualified; (O) Play-off winners; (P) Promoted; (R) Relegated

== Promotion/relegation play-off ==
To the play-off qualified four teams, the 18th placed team of 1997-98 Ukrainian First League and three group winners of 1997-98 Ukrainian Second League:

- FC Bukovyna Chernivtsi
- FC Podillya Khmelnytskyi (Group A)
- FC Krystal Kherson (Group B)
- FC Shakhtar-2 Donetsk (Group C)

Top three teams qualified for the First League, the fourth and last team qualified for the Second Team. Format was a single round robin in Kyiv and Boryspil, Kyiv Oblast. When tied on points, the main tie-breaker was head-to-head games. The tournament was conducted at almost empty stadiums. The tournament was discontinued right after the second round when it became apparent that Krystal was not able to secure the third and the safe place to receive promotion. The Georgian footballer George Magriani (Podillya) became the top scorer of the tournament with three goals.

Pos	Team	Pld	W	D	L	GF	GA	GD	Pts	Promotion or relegation
1	Podillya Khmelnytskyi (C)	2	1	1	0	5	1	+4	4	Promoted to First League
2	Bukovyna Chernivtsi	2	1	1	0	3	2	+1	4	Retained
3	Shakhtar-2 Donetsk	2	1	0	1	1	4	−3	3	Promoted to First League
4	Krystal Kherson	2	0	0	2	1	3	−2	0	No promotion

(C) Champions

=== Games ===
6 July 1998

Shakhtar-2 Donetsk	0 : 4	Podillya Khmelnytskyi
	Report	Tymoshchuk 28'; Kryvyi 62'; Magriani 75', 90'

CSK ZSU Stadium, Kyiv
Attendance: 100
Referee: Oleksandr Tyutyun, Fastiv
6 July 1998

Krystal Kherson	1 : 2	Bukovyna Chernivtsi
Bohomol 85'	Report	Lashuk 3'; Semotyuk 49'

Kolos Stadium, Boryspil
Attendance: 500
Referee: Anatoliy Kutsev, Kyiv

9 July 1998

Podillya Khmelnytskyi	1 : 1	Bukovyna Chernivtsi
Magriani 66' (pen.)	Report	Belous 63'

Dynamo Stadium, Kyiv
Attendance: 100
Referee: Ihor Yaremchuk, Kyiv
9 July 1998

Shakhtar-2 Donetsk	1 : 0	Krystal Kherson
Dranov 77'	Report

CSK ZSU Stadium, Kyiv
Attendance: 100
Referee: Serhiy Shebek, Kyiv

== Top scorers ==
Statistics are taken from here.

	Scorer	Goals (Pen.)	Team
1	(Ukraine) Oleh Hrytsay	22 (1)	FC Cherkasy
1	(Ukraine) Hennadiy Skidan	22 (2)	SC Mykolaiv
3	(Ukraine) Vadym Plotnikov	21 (1)	Stal Alchevsk
4	(Ukraine) Ruslan Zabranskyi	17	SC Mykolaiv
4	(Ukraine) Borys Finkel	17 (2)	Nyva Vinnytsia
6	(Ukraine) Rais Tierkulov	16 (1)	Shakhtar Makiivka
6	(Ukraine) Oleksandr Barabash	16 (8)	Shakhtar Makiivka
8	(Ukraine) Pavlo Parshyn	15	Metalurh / Polissya
8	(Ukraine) Vadym Kharchenko	15 (8)	Naftovyk Okhtyrka
10	(Ukraine) Oleksandr Ostashov	14	Stal Alchevsk

== See also ==
- Ukrainian Premier League 1997-98
- 1997–98 Ukrainian Second League
