= Masis =

Masis, Massis, or MASIS may refer to:

- Masis (given name)
- Massis (surname)
- Mount Ararat, a mountain in Turkey historically known as Masis by the Armenians
- Masis (town), a town in Ararat Province, Armenia
- Masis (village), a village in Ararat Province, Armenia
- Masis Municipality, Armenia
- MAS Integrated School, MASIS, a school in Puerto Rico
- FC Masis, a defunct football club in Armenia
- Massis (weekly), an Armenian publication in Los Angeles, CA
- Massis (periodical), an Armenian Catholic publication in Beirut, Lebanon
- Massis (Constantinople periodical), an Armenian Ottoman publication (1852–1908), first established as Hayasdan, published in Constantinople (now Istanbul)
- Memory and SMS interface standard (where "SMS" stands for "STAR Memory System", and "STAR" in turn stands for "Self-Test and Repair"), a specialized hardware description language created by Synopsys for the purpose of describing random-access memory structures in integrated circuit design.

== Massifs ==
- Massís del Besiberri, also known as Besiberri Massif
- Massís de Cardó, also known as Cardó Massif
- Massís Centrau, also known as Massif Central
- Massís del Garraf, also known as Garraf Massif
- Massís de les Gavarres, also known as Gavarres
- Massís del Montgrí, also known as Montgrí Massif
- Massís del Caroig, also known as Massís del Caroig
