= Andronov =

Andronov (Russian: Андро́нов), feminine: Andronova is a Russian and Bulgarian patronymic surname derived from the given name Andron. Notable people with the surname include:

- Aleksandr Andronov (1901–1952), Soviet physicist
- Iona Andronov (1934–2024), Russian journalist and politician
- M. Andronov, pen name of Mikhail Mikhalkov (1922–2006), Soviet intelligence officer and writer
- Nikolai Andronov (1929–1998), Soviet and Russian painter and muralist
- Peter Andronov (born 1969), Bulgarian financier and banker
- Sergei Andronov (born 1989), Russian ice hockey player
- Yuriy Andronov (born 1971), Russian race walker

== See also ==
- Andronov (crater), a lunar crater
- 11003 Andronov, a minor planet
