= Deportation of Azerbaijanis from Armenia (1947–1950) =

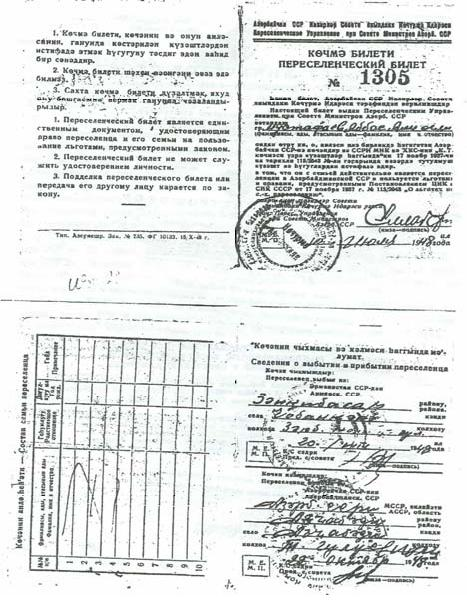
The Resettlement Ticket of the Azerbaijani Abbas Ali oglu Mustafayev from the Zangibasar district of the Armenian SSR to the Agjabedi district of the Azerbaijan SSR (issued on 10 July 1948)

The Azerbaijani population of the Armenian SSR was deported in 1947-1950 in accordance with the Decree of the Council of Ministers of the USSR No. 4083 dated with 23 December 1947.

== Background ==
In the late 1930s, the USSR's relations with Turkey deteriorated. This process of control over the straits was accelerated by the possibility of Turkey's entry into the war on the German side in World War II. The USSR made territorial claims concerning Kars and Ardahan through Armenia and Georgia. However, all these attempts were rejected by Western countries. The territorial integrity of Iran and Turkey was maintained.

Historian Vladislav Zubok wrote that after the failure of the Turkish issue the leaders of these republics “began to scheme against Azerbaijan”. On February 22, 1946, Stalin signed a document executing the decision. The return project began in 1946 with the arrival of 50,000 Armenians in Armenia. That number was 35,000 in 1947. By the end of 1948, 86,000 Armenians had moved to the USSR. However, the USSR ended the program, fearing the arrival of foreign spies among the Armenians.

After the failure of land claims from Turkey and the rejection of the request to unite Nagorno-Karabakh, Grigory Arutinov appealed to Stalin for another issue. He demanded the deportation of Azerbaijanis to Azerbaijan due to the lack of land and property that arose after the Armenians were brought to Armenia. The Soviet government justified this with the claim that Azerbaijan allegedly needed labour to develop cotton production in the Kura-Araz lowland.

According to the historian Vladislav Martynovich Zubok, with the filing of “the first secretary of the Central Committee of the Communist Party of the Armenian SSR Grigory Arutyunov” who had lost his hope of the return of the “ancestors' land”, Stalin ordered to deport the Azerbaijani population of the Armenian SSR to Azerbaijan in order to free space for the Armenian repatriates, whose number was estimated at 400 thousand." According to Vladislav Zubok, 90 thousand Armenians came to Armenia. The majority of them were individuals who had lived through the Armenian Genocide and/or were descendants of those who had either escaped or been forcibly deported by Turkish government during it, and who could not return to their homes in Western Armenia. The Azerbaijanis were forced to move to the Kura-Aras lowland of Azerbaijan, where cotton growing developed rapidly, and their places, as planned, were taken by the newly arrived Armenians.

== Deportation of the Azerbaijani population from the Armenian SSR ==
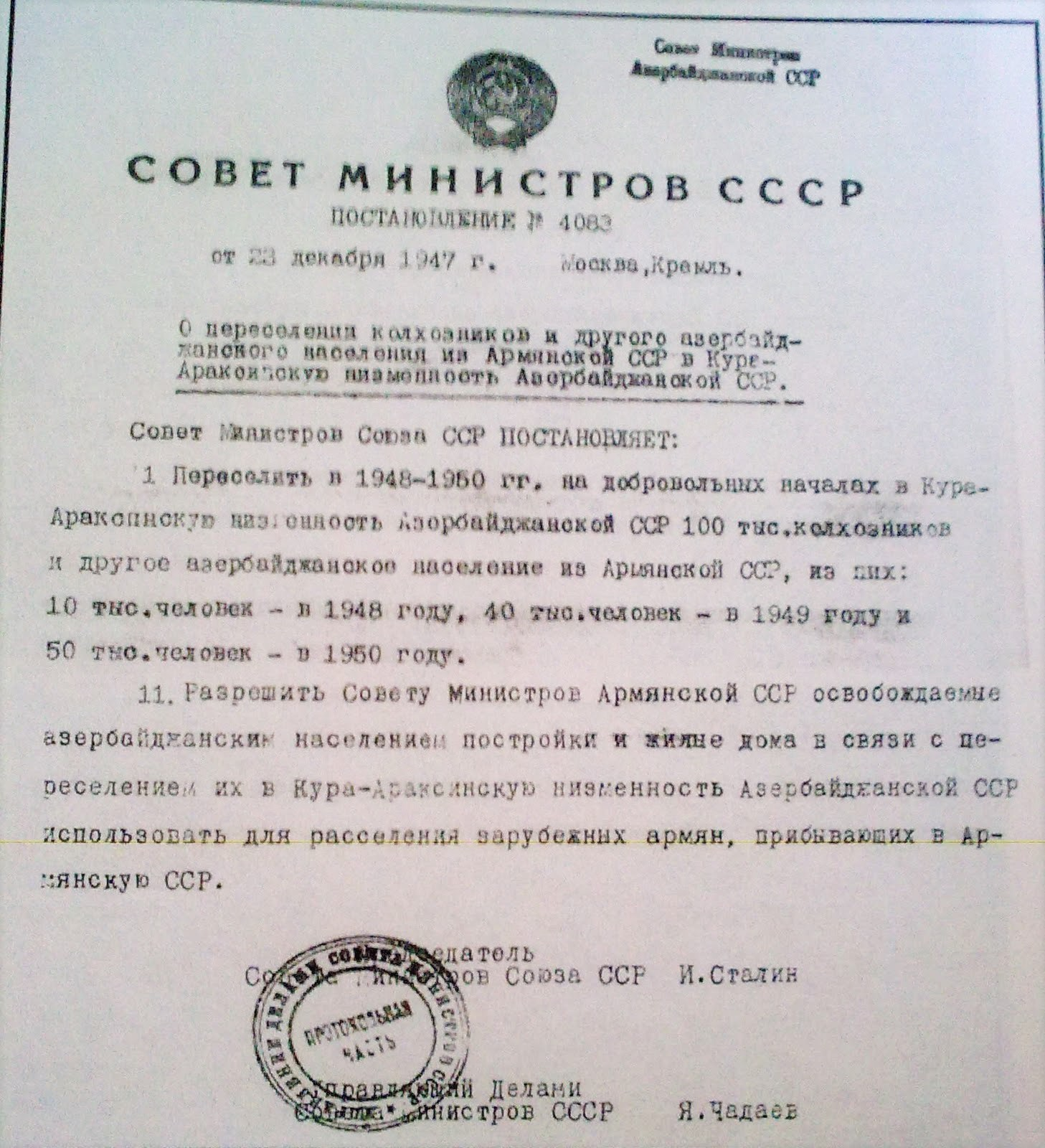
On 23 December 1947, Stalin signed a decree on the voluntary resettlement of the local Azerbaijani population from the Armenian SSR and the settlement on their lands and in their homes of the foreign Armenians.

=== The launch of the deportation ===
In December 1947, the communist leaders of Armenia and Azerbaijan addressed a joint letter to Stalin. In the letter, the leaders of the two countries agreed to relocate 130,000 Azerbaijanis from Armenia to Azerbaijan, thereby creating vacancies for Armenians coming to Armenia from abroad.

The deportation's details were also defined in the Decree of the Council of Ministers of the USSR No. 754. The migrants, according to this decision, were to be allocated their part of the collective farm movable property and be provided the free transportation of this property to their new place of residence. The cost of the movable property left on the territory of Armenia was to be paid to the collective farms at the place of the new resettlement of these Azerbaijanis. The settlers were provided with some benefits, and also issued non-refundable cash benefits in the amount of 1,000 rubles for the head of the family and 300 rubles for each family member. The Council of Ministers of the Armenian SSR pledged to provide assistance to the migrants in the sale of their houses belonging to the places of their exit.

The deportation was planned to be implemented in 1948–1950 on a “voluntary basis” and, in accordance to the plan, 10,000 Azerbaijanis should be resettled in 1948, 40,000 in 1949, and 50,000 in 1950. On March 10, 1948, the USSR Council of Ministers adopted another decision detailing many small details, including the transfer of the salaries and property of the displaced persons from Armenia to Azerbaijan. In addition, Moscow applied the 17 November 1937 Law “On Benefits for Rural Resettlement”. This law was mainly related to the resettlement of people from Siberia, Kazakhstan and the Far East to Azerbaijan.

It was planned to deport about 100 thousand people to Kura-Aras lowland (Azerbaijan SSR) in three stages, including 10 thousand in 1948, 40 thousand in 1949 and 50 thousand in 1950. These plans, however, could not be implemented in such a short time due to the insufficient funding for the construction work on the territory of the Azerbaijan SSR. Based on the appeal of the Council of Ministers of the Azerbaijan SSR, the deportation program was adjusted and extended until 1954.

== Aftermath ==
Some Azerbaijani authors associated the resettlement with the return of the Armenian repatriates, while the Armenians, at their turn, with the need of development of the new lands in Azerbaijan. According to Viktor Shnirelman, this was not a repressive measure, and, after Stalin's death, the Azerbaijanis returned to their former homes. According to the Azerbaijani authors M. Allahverdiyev and A. Aleskerov, the resettlement was caused by a significant expansion of the irrigated areas in the Kura-Aras lowland and the organized resettlement of the Azerbaijanis from the Transcaucasian and Central Asian republics and other regions to the republic.

== See also ==
- Ethnic minorities in Armenia
- Demographics of Armenia
- Deportation of Azerbaijanis from Armenia
- Population transfer in the Soviet Union
