= Deportation of Azerbaijanis from Armenia =

Forced resettlement of Azerbaijanis from Armenia

Mass deportation of Azerbaijanis from Armenia took place several times throughout the 20th century, and sometimes some of them have been described by some authors as acts of forced resettlement and ethnic cleansing.

Under Stalin's policies, approximately 100,000 Azerbaijanis were deported from the Armenian SSR in 1948. Their houses were subsequently inhabited by Armenian repatriates who arrived in the Soviet Union from abroad.

Azerbaijanis continued to live in the Armenian SSR until the outbreak of the Nagorno-Karabakh conflict in 1988–89, when practically all Azerbaijanis in Armenia left or were expelled concurrently with the expulsion/flight of Armenians from Azerbaijan. The deportation was done largely without bloodshed and it was partially in response to Armenians being forced out of Azerbaijan; it was also the last phase of the gradual homogenization of the Armenian republic under Soviet rule.

== Beginning of the 20th century ==
As a result of Armenian-Azerbaijani interethnic conflict in the beginning of the 20th century, as well as Armenian and Azerbaijani nationalists' coordinated policy of ethnic cleansing, a substantial portion of the Armenian and Azerbaijani population was driven out from the territory of both Republic of Armenia and Republic of Azerbaijan. Starting in the middle of 1918, Armenian paramilitary forces under the leadership of General Andranik Ozanian destroyed Muslim settlements in Zangezur (the southernmost part of modern-day Armenia). The British command, which had its own political objectives didn't allow Andranik to extend his activity to Karabakh. Andranik brought 30,000 Armenian Genocide survivors from Eastern Anatolia in the Ottoman Empire, mainly from Mush and Bitlis. Part of Armenian refugees from the Ottoman Empire remained in Zangezur, whereas many others were settled in regions of Yerevan and Daralagoz, where they took the place of outcast Muslims in order to making Armenia's key regions ethnically homogeneous.

Soviet Armenian historian and Bolshevik politician Bagrat Boryan charged that the ARF had not established state authority for the administrative needs of Armenia, but for the “extermination of the Muslim population and looting of their property”. According to data from Caucasian Ethnographical Collection of Academy of Sciences of the USSR, "the settlements of Azerbaijani population in Armenia had become empty." Nataliya Volkova writes that the ruling party of the First Republic of Armenia, the ARF-Dashnaktsutyun, followed a "policy of 'cleansing the country from outsiders'" which "targeted the Muslim population, especially those who had been driven out from Novobayazet, Yerevan, Echmiadzin and Sherur-Daralagoz districts.

== Relocation from the Armenian SSR ==
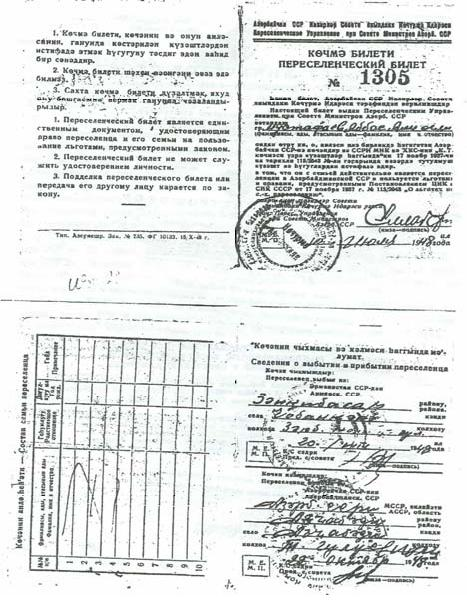
Resettlement ticket of an Azerbaijani person from Armenian SSR (from Chobankand, Zangibasar district)

The relocation of the Azerbaijani population during the Stalinist era happened after the establishment of the Armenian SSR. According to the First All-Union Census of the Soviet Union of 1926, Azerbaijanis made up 9.6% of the Republic's population (84,705 people). According to All-Union census of 1939, 130,896 Azerbaijanis lived in Armenian SSR. Results of All-Union census of 1959 show that this figure decreased to 107,748, although Azerbaijanis had one of the highest birth rates in the Soviet Union. The Soviet-era deportation of Azerbaijanis from Armenia and relocation of Armenians living outside the borders of the Soviet Union to Armenia, favoured by the Stalinist policy was the main factor of decrease in the size of Azerbaijani population. In 1937, Muslim Kurds were deported to Kazakhstan from border districts of Armenia with Turkey, immediately after appearance of the problem in USSR-Turkey relations, because of Turkey's denial of the Soviet Union's request for joint control of the Black Sea straits. In 1945 the Soviet Union presented a territorial claim to Turkish territories of Kars and Ardahan. This confrontation in the relations of both countries lasted until Stalin's death. These policies continued until 1953, and Stalin's decisions became the significant step of offering Armenians living in other countries to move to Soviet Armenia. The Armenian SSR was located in an advantageous military-geographical territory at the eastern frontier of Turkey within the context of influencing Turkey. Cleansing Armenia of the Azerbaijani Muslims with the purpose of strengthening Armenia's position within this framework was one of the plans of the Soviet regime. In the Soviet government's judgement, “disloyal” Azerbaijanis were potential “fifth columns” in the case of conflict with Turkey and for this reason Stalin signed off Azerbaijani population's deportation from Armenian SSR in accordance with the Soviet Union's Council of Ministers’ Resolution No. 4083 from December 23, 1947. One clauses of the resolution stated:

To allow the Council of Ministers of Armenian SSR to use the buildings and houses, which were vacated by Azerbaijani population in connection with their resettlement to Kura-Aras Lowland of Azerbaijan SSR for settlement of foreign Armenians coming to Armenian SSR.

Details of resettlement were defined in the Soviet Union's Council of Ministers’ Resolution No. 754. The part of kolkhoz's (collective farm) moveable property was assigned and gratuitous transportation of this property to the new settlement was provided for the deported. The price of moveable property abandoned in Armenia was paid for in kolkhozes at places of the new settlement of Azerbaijanis. Some benefits were given to migrants and at the same time, permanent grants of 1000 rubles were given out per head of the family and 300 rubles per each member of the family. According to historian Vladislav Zubok, due to calls from Grigory Arutinov, the First Secretary of Armenian SSR's Communist Party's Central Committee, Stalin ordered to deport Azerbaijani population from the Armenian SSR to the Azerbaijan SSR. At the same time, he gave consent for the repatriation of 90,000 Armenians to settlements of the newly deported Azerbaijanis. The resettlement was not voluntary.

According to Krista A. Goff, First Secretary of the Azerbaijan SSR Mir Jafar Baghirov and Arutinov worked together to facilitate Azerbaijani relocation. At the time, the Kura-Aras lowlands in Azerbaijan were sparsely populated, infrastructurally undeveloped, and economically unproductive. Through resettlement of Azerbaijanis in the Armenian SSR to the Azerbaijan SSR, Azerbaijan would gain a labor force that could make the Kura-Aras region productive. For the most part, Soviet Azerbaijani officials chose to collaborate in the Azerbaijani resettlement. On some occasions, they accused Armenian officials of subverting the resettlement, on the grounds that they were obstructing the relocation of Azerbaijani migrants and not returning the migrants who came back to Armenia. Indeed, some Armenian officials did obstruct resettlement to keep Azerbaijani collective farmers producing in the Armenian SSR.

According to Thomas de Waal, the Azerbaijanis of Armenia once again fell victims to the Armenian–Turkish question. According to Arsene Saparov, more than 100,000 Azerbaijanis were forcibly resettled to Kura-Aras Lowland of the Azerbaijan SSR in three stages: 10,000 people in 1948, 40,000 in 1949, and 50,000 in 1950. Krista Goff, however, has contested that based on the available documentation only a total of 45,000 were resettled through the period 1948–53.

The Azerbaijanis which were transferred out of Armenia were resettled by Azerbaijan in the regions separating Armenia from Nagorno-Karabakh. According to the historian Astourian, "even though this resettlement project had little to do with ethnic cleansing, it has been portrayed as such since the late 1980s."

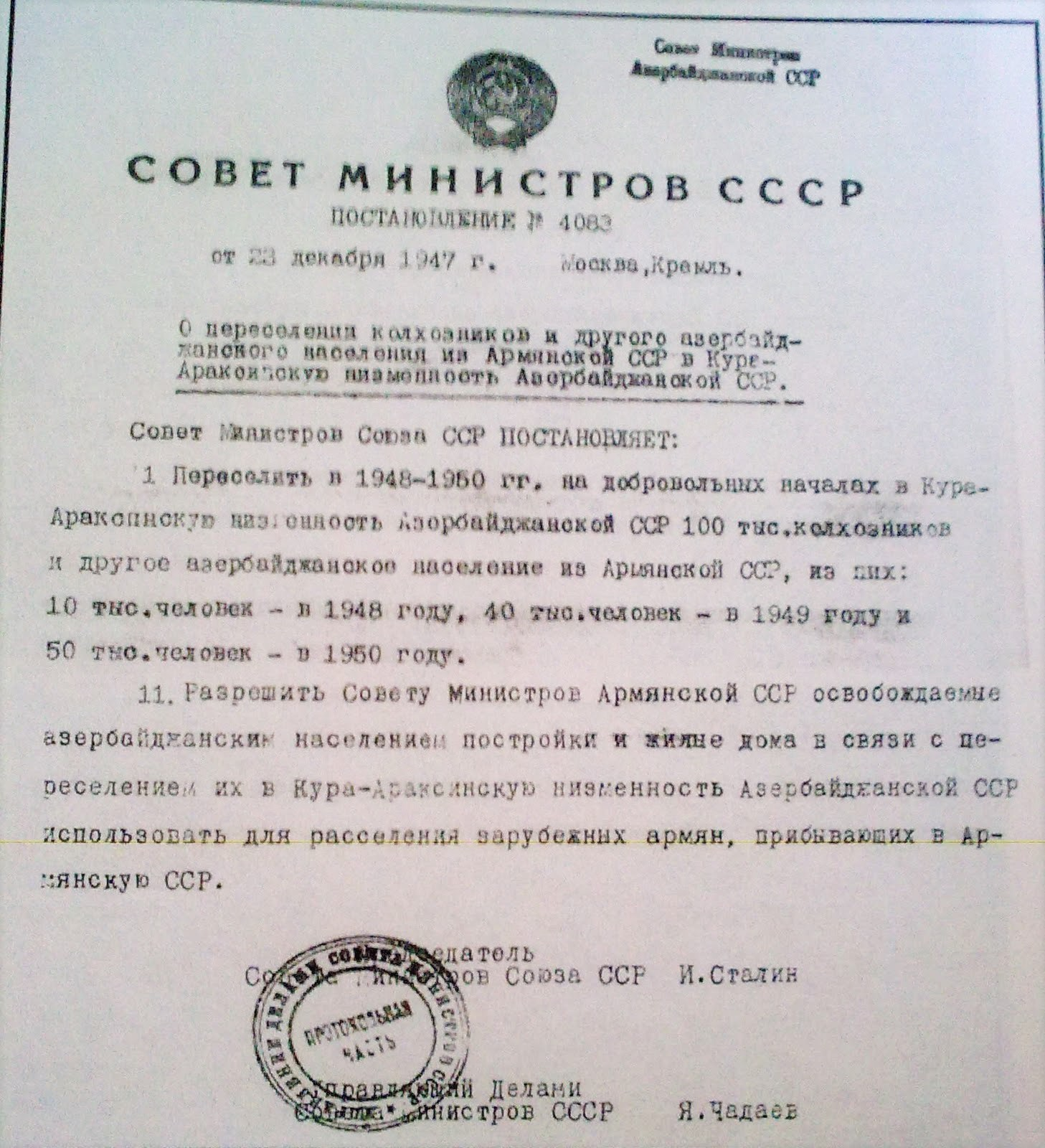
Stalin's decree ordering the deportations of the Azerbaijanis, December 23, 1947.

== Nagorno-Karabakh conflict ==
According to the census of 1979, Azerbaijanis were the largest minority in Armenia making up 5.3% of Armenia's population (approximately 160,800 people).

According to a 2003 United Nations High Commissioner for Refugees report, Azerbaijanis were expelled from Armenia or fled out of fear following the anti-Armenian pogroms in Sumgait and Baku of 1988–89. Armenian nationalists, together with the Soviet republic's administration, were thought to have co-operated in driving Azerbaijanis out. According to data collected by Arif Yunusov, about 40,897 Azerbaijani families fled and 216 Azerbaijanis died (127 of them killed by Armenians) during the resettlements in 1988–1991. Soviet official statistics confirmed 25 victims from that list to be killed in the northern regions of Armenia, including the Gugark district, where 11 people were killed during the Gugark pogrom. The remainder of the Azerbaijani population was driven away from the country in 1991. By 2004, not more than 30 Azerbaijanis were living in Armenia.

Razmik Panossian refers to this population transfer as the last phase of Armenia's gradual ethnic homogenization and an episode of ethnic cleansing that increased the country's ethnic Armenian population from 97% to 98%. According to Russian human rights defender Sergey Lyozov, the mass deportation of Azerbaijanis from Armenia in November 1988 was one of the factors that turned the Nagorno-Karabakh conflict into a "battle to the end" involving either physical extermination or total expulsion of an ethnic group.

Changes in the demographic character were accompanied by a policy of renaming settlements and toponyms on the territory of the Armenian SSR. In total, more than 600 toponyms were renamed in the Armenian SSR between 1924 and 1988. Such alterations of toponyms continued in the post-Soviet period. According to State Committee's superior Manuk Vardanyan, 57 toponyms were further renamed in 2006, with plans to rename a further 21 settlements in 2007. Azerbaijani cultural institutions in Armenia also suffered as a result of the expulsions. The Agababa-Childir and Daralagoz ashig schools entirely disappeared in the wake of the expulsion of Azerbaijanis from Armenia.

== Population statistics of Azerbaijanis in Armenia ==
=== Chronology ===
• 1947 - The Soviet Union's Councils of Ministers’ resolution about resettlement of Azerbaijanis from Armenian SSR to Azerbaijan SSR

• 1947–1950 - Eviction of Azerbaijanis from Armenian SSR by Soviet Decree

• November, 1987- Deportation of Azerbaijanis from Kapan and Meghri districts of the Armenian SSR

• February 21, 1988 - Mass demonstrations began in Yerevan for the unification of Nagorno-Karabakh with the Armenia SSR

• November, 1988 - Mass deportation of Azerbaijanis from Armenia

=== Number of Azerbaijanis in Armenia ===
	1926	1939	1959	1970	1979	1989	2001
Azerbaijanis (number of people and their percentage as part of Armenia's population)	84,705 (9.6%)	130,896 (10.2%)	107,748 (6.1%)	148,189 (5.9%)	160,841 (5.2%)	84,860 (2.5%)	29 (0.01%)

=== Changes in the demographic structure of Yerevan ===
According to the Russian census of 1897, Yerevan, then a town called Erivan, had 29,006 residents: 12,523 of them were Armenian-speakers and 12,359 were Tatar-speakers. According to the Brockhaus and Efron Encyclopedia, Azerbaijanis (Tatars) made up more than 12 thousand (41 percent) of 29 thousand inhabitants in the city. According to the census of 1959, Armenians made up 96 percent population of the country and in 1989 more than 96.5 percent. Azerbaijanis then made up only 0.1 percent of Yerevan's population, this change was attributed to Soviet nationalities policies. Yerevan's population was changed in Armenians' favour by sidelining the local Muslim population. As a result of the Nagorno-Karabakh conflict, the Azerbaijanis of Yerevan were driven away.

== See also ==
- Yeraz
- Nagorno-Karabakh war
- Nagorno-Karabakh conflict
- Population transfer in the Soviet Union
- Forced settlements in the Soviet Union
- Azerbaijanis in Armenia
- Deportation of Azerbaijanis from Armenia (1947-1950)
- Expulsion of Nagorno-Karabakh Armenians

== Bibliography ==
- Bloxham, Donald (2005). The Great Game of Genocide: Imperialism, Nationalism, and the Destruction of the Ottoman Armenians. Oxford: Oxford University Press. ISBN 9780199226887.
- Burdett, A.L.P. (1998). Slavic & Balkan Titles: Armenia: Political And Ethnic Boundaries - 1878–1948. Cambridge University Press. ISBN 9781852079550. Archived from the original on 2017-09-17.
- de Waal, Thomas (1996). Black Garden: Armenia and Azerbaijan through peace and war. New York: New York University Press. ISBN 0-8147-1945-7.
- de Waal, Thomas (2015). Great Catastrophe : Armenians and Turks in the Shadow of Genocide. Oxford: Oxford University Press. ISBN 978-0-19-935069-8.
