= Massis (surname) =

Massis is a French surname that may refer to

- Alfredo De Massis, Italian management and organization scientist
- Annick Massis (born 1958), French soprano singer
- Henri Massis (1886–1970), French essayist, literary critic and literary historian
- John Massis (1940–1988), Flemish strongman
