= Antonov (disambiguation) =

Antonov, or Antonov Aeronautical Scientist/Technical Complex (Antonov ASTC) is a Ukrainian aircraft manufacturing and services company.

Antonov may also refer to:

- Antonov (surname)
- Antonov Airlines, a Ukrainian cargo airline, division of the Antonov ASTC
- Antonov Airport, or Hostomel Airport, a Ukrainian airport, operated by the Antonov ASTC
- Antonovka, an apple cultivar
