= Alexander Antonov (soldier) =

Russian soldier (1972–2022)

Alexander Sergeevich Antonov
- Алекса́ндр Серге́евич Анто́нов
- Born: 8 April 1972; Arsenyev, Primorsky Krai, Russian SFSR
- Died: 2 December 2022 (aged 50); Klishchiivka, Donetsk Oblast, Ukraine
- Burial place: Preobrazhenskoye Cemetery, Chelyabinsk, Russia
- Military career
- Allegiance: Russia (1990–2022); Wagner Group (2022)
- Branch: Russian Air Force (1990–2022); Wagner Group (2022)
- Unit: 2nd Bomber Aviation Regiment
- Conflicts: Russian intervention in the Syrian civil war Russian invasion of Ukraine: Battle of Bakhmut †

Alexander Sergeevich Antonov (Ru: Алекса́ндр Серге́евич Анто́нов; 8 April 1972 – 2 December 2022) was a Russian soldier and mercenary in the Wagner Group.

== Biography ==
Antonov was born in Arsenyev, Primorsky Krai, Russian SFSR. He graduated from School No. 18 in Volgodonsk. In 1990, he entered the Barnaul Higher Military Aviation School of Pilots, graduating in 1995. He then joined the Russian Air Force, serving in the 2nd Bomber Aviation Regiment in Dzhida, and after 2010 at the 6980th Air Base in Chelyabinsk. Antonov retired in the summer of 2022, his last position being deputy regiment commander for flight training. He served in the Russian intervention in the Syrian civil war.

Shortly after retiring, Antonov joined the air force of the Wagner Group. On 2 December 2022, during fighting in the Battle of Bakhmut in the Russian Invasion of Ukraine, his Su-24 was shot down over Klishchiivka by Ukrainian forces using a MANPADS. Antonov and his copilot, Vladimir Nikishin, were killed. Antonov and Nikishin's bodies were handed to the Russians on 15 December.

Antonov is buried at the Preobrazhenskoye Cemetery in Chelyabinsk. In August 2023, the Barnaul Law Institute erected a statue of him. He earned the Hero of the Russian Federation medal posthumously on 17 December 2022.
