= Oleh Hrytsay =

Ukrainian footballer

Personal information
- Full name: Oleh Anatoliyovych Hrytsay
- Date of birth: 26 September 1974 (age 52)
- Place of birth: Chernihiv, Soviet Union
- Position: Forward

Senior career*
Years	Team	Apps	(Gls)
1992–1993	Cheksyl Chernihiv	8	(0)
1994–1995	Dnipro Cherkasy	66	(0)
1996	Krystal Chortkiv	21	(2)
1996	Prykarpattia Ivano-Frankivsk	12	(0)
1997–1999	Cherkasy	116	(60)
2000	Dnipro Dnipropetrovsk	12	(1)
2000	→ Dnipro-2 Dnipropetrovsk	9	(3)
2000	→ Dnipro-3 Dnipropetrovsk	2	(0)
2001	Nafkom Brovary	15	(3)
2002	Polissya Zhytomyr	15	(0)
2003	Desna Chernihiv	11	(0)
2003	Cherkasy	14	(2)
2006–2008	Khodak Cherkasy	24	(4)
- * Club domestic league appearances and goals

Oleh Anatoliyovych Hrytsay (Ukrainian: Олег Анатолійович Грицай; born 24 July 1973) is a Ukrainian retired professional footballer who played as a forward.

== Career ==
Along with Hennadiy Skidan, Hrytsay became the highest scorer when he scored 22 goals for FC Cherkasy during the 1997–98 Ukrainian First League season. The next season Hrytsay became the highest scorer when he scored 19 goals for FC Cherkasy during the 1998–99 Ukrainian First League season.

== Honours ==
Dnipro Cherkasy

- Ukrainian Football Amateur Association: 2003

FC Cheksyl Chernihiv

- Chernihiv Oblast Football Championship 1992

Individual

- Top Scorer Ukrainian First League: 1997–98 (22 goals)
- Top Scorer Ukrainian First League: 1998–99 (19 goals)
