= Rajput clans =

List of clans of Rajputs

Rajput (from Sanskrit raja-putra 'son of a king') is a large multi-component cluster of castes, kin bodies, and local groups, sharing social status and ideology of genealogical descent originating from the Indian subcontinent. The term Rajput covers various patrilineal clans historically associated with warriorhood: several clans claim Rajput status, although not all claims are universally accepted. According to modern scholars, almost all Rajputs clans originated from peasant or pastoral communities.

== Lineages ==
Genealogies of the Rajput clans were fabricated by pastoral nomadic tribes when they became sedentary. In a process called Rajputization, after acquiring political power, they employed bards to fabricate these lineages which also disassociated them from their original ancestry of cattle-herding or cattle-rustling communities and acquired the name 'Rajput'. There are three basic lineages (vanshas or vamshas) among Rajputs. Each of these lineages is divided into several clans (kula) (total of 36 clans). Suryavanshi denotes descent from the solar deity Surya, Chandravanshi (Somavanshi) from the lunar deity Chandra, and Agnivanshi from the fire deity Agni. The Agnivanshi clans include Parmar, Chaulukya (Solanki), Parihar and Chauhan.

Lesser-noted vansh include Udayvanshi, Rajvanshi, and Rishivanshi. The histories of the various vanshs were later recorded in documents known as vamshāavalīis; André Wink counts these among the "status-legitimizing texts".

Beneath the vansh division are smaller and smaller subdivisions: kul, shakh ("branch"), khamp or khanp ("twig"), and nak ("twig tip"). Marriages within a kul are generally disallowed (with some flexibility for kul-mates of different gotra lineages). The kul serves as the primary identity for many of the Rajput clans, and each kul is protected by a family goddess, the kuldevi. Lindsey Harlan notes that in some cases, shakhs have become powerful enough to be functionally kuls in their own right.

== Suryavanshi lineage ==
The Suryavanshi lineage (also known as the Raghuvanshies or Solar Dynasty) are clans who claim descent from Surya, the Hindu Sun-god.

- Kachhwaha
  - Shekhawat
  - Naruka
  - Bandhalgoti
- Rathore
  - Vadhel
- Guhila or Gohil
  - Sisodia or Sisodiya
    - Chundawat
- Gahadavala
  - Bundela
- Bargujar
- Bais
- Gaur
- Jamwal
- Minhas
- Pundir
- Jethwa

== Chandravanshi lineage ==
The Chandravanshi lineage (Somavanshi or Lunar Dynasty) claims descent from Chandra, The lineage is further divided into Yaduvansh dynasty descendants of King Yadu and Puruvansh dynasty descendants of King Puru.

=== Puruvanshi Clans ===
- Tomar (Tanwar/Toor)
  - Pathania
- Chandel or Chandela
- Katoch

=== Yaduvanshi Clans ===
- Bhati/Bhatti
- Jadaun
- Raksel
- Banaphar
- Samma
  - Chudasama
    - Sarvaiya
  - Jadeja

== Agnivanshi lineage ==
The Agnivanshi lineage claim descent from Agni, the Hindu god of fire.

=== Agnivanshi Clans ===
- Parihar
- Parmar/Panwar/Pawar
  - Mori
  - Sodha
  - Ujjainiya
- Chauhan
  - Hada
  - Deora
  - Khichi
  - Bhadauria
  - Negi
- Solanki
  - Vaghela

== Other Clans ==
- Gautam
- Jhala
- Sengar
- Dor

== Battalion (Regiment) Clans ==
In medieval Indian history, Rajputs made several regiments, special battalions and mercenaries specially during Rajput Era to fight against foreign invaders which consisted of Rajput soldiers from some or all Rajput clans. Their descendents still use those regiment Rajput surnames

=== Regiment Clans ===
- Purbia

Purbiya (or Purabia) are Rajput led mercenaries and soldiers from the eastern Gangetic Plain – areas corresponding to present-day western Bihar and eastern Uttar Pradesh.

== 36 royal races ==
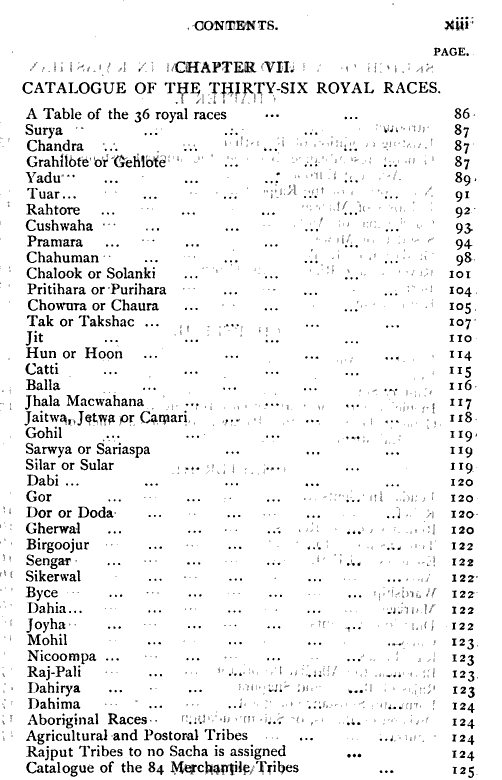
Tod's 1829 listing of the royal races

The 36 royal races (Chathis Rajkula) is a listing of Indian social groups purported to be the royal (ruling) clans of several states and Janapads of the northern Indian subcontinent. Among the historical attempts at creating a comprehensive listing of the 36 are the Kumarapala Prabandha of Acharya Jinamandan Gani of 1435 AD, Prithviraj Raso of uncertain date, and British officer James Tod's 1829 Annals and Antiquities of Rajasthan.

=== Kumarapala Prabandha list ===
The Kumarpal Prabandha (about the reign of Kumarapala Solanki of Chaulukya dynasty r. 1143-1172 CE) list provides 36 clans starting with dynasties mentioned in the classics, Surya and its Ikshvaku sub-branch, Chandra and its Yadu (Yadava) branch. It also mentions some of the later famous clans: Parmar, Chauhan, Chaulukya (Solanki), Pratihara Ratt, Chandela. It also mentions other Deccani dynasties like Shilahara, Chapotkata, Nikumbh etc. Many of the names are less known. Notably, it includes the Mourya.

Kumarpal Prabandha was consulted by Tod, and he refers to it as Kumarpal Charit.

== See also ==
- Caste system in India
- List of Rajput dynasties and states

== Bibliography ==
- Richard Eaton (2019). India in the Persianate Age: 1000-1765. Penguin Books Limited. ISBN 978-0-14-196655-7.
- Eugenia Vanina (2012). Medieval Indian Mindscapes: Space, Time, Society, Man. Primus Books. ISBN 978-93-80607-19-1.
- Shail Mayaram (2013). Against History, Against State: Counterperspectives from the Margins. Columbia University Press. ISBN 978-0-231-52951-8.
- Lindsey Harlan (1992). Religion and Rajput Women: The Ethic of Protection in Contemporary Narratives. Berkeley, California: University of California Press. ISBN 978-0-520-07339-5.
- Zimmer, Heinrich (1952), Joseph Campbell (ed.), Philosophies of India, London: Routledge & Kegan Paul Ltd, ISBN 978-81-208-0739-6
