= Aleksandr Antonov =

Aleksandr or Alexander Antonov may refer to:

- Alexander Antonov (politician) (1888–1922), Russian politician
- Aleksandr Antonov (actor) (1898–1962), Russian actor
- Aleksandr Antonov (footballer) (born 1958), Russian football player and coach
- Alexander Antonov (soldier) (1972–2022) , Russian soldier and mercenary in the Wagner Group
