= Andon =

Andon may refer to:

- Andon (manufacturing), a system for notifying management, maintenance, and other workers of a quality or process problem
- A Japanese traditional paper lantern
- Andon, journal of the Society for Japanese Arts
- Andon, Alpes-Maritimes, France
- Andon (name), a male given name
- Andon of Andon and Fonta, the first two human beings on planet Earth, according to the Urantia Book
