= Yeraz =

The Yeraz people, sometimes called Yer-az or Yerazi, are an Azerbaijani sub-group, also referred to as a clan, consisting of Azerbaijanis originally from present-day Armenia. The term Yeraz in the Azerbaijani language derives from "Azerbaijani from Yerevan", and used even if the person does not hail from the city of Yerevan itself.

Due to longtime historic tensions between neighboring Armenia and Azerbaijan, virtually all the Yeraz have left Armenia for Azerbaijan and other countries before tensions exploded with the First Nagorno-Karabakh War. Because they developed with some different customs and cuisine from Azerbaijanis in Azerbaijan, the Yerazi have maintained a cohesive sub-culture within the country. Due to tension and cultural differences between Azerbaijanis from Azerbaijan and Azerbaijanis from Armenia, the term "Yeraz" can be construed as a pejorative.

== History ==
The Azerbaijani community in Armenia represented a large number but has been virtually non-existent since 1988–1991, when the overwhelming majority of Azerbaijanis fled the country as a result of the First Nagorno-Karabakh War and the ongoing conflict between Armenia and Azerbaijan. United Nations High Commissioner for Refugees (UNHCR) estimates the current population of Azerbaijanis in Armenia to be somewhere between 30 and a few hundred persons, with majority of them living in rural areas and being members of mixed couples (mostly Azerbaijani women married to Armenian men), as well as elderly and sick, and thus unable to leave the country. Most of them are also reported to have changed their names and maintain a low profile to avoid discrimination.

== Political power ==
In Azerbaijan, the Yeraz form a cohesive political clan that, along with the Nakhchivani clan, has dominated Azerbaijani politics since Soviet times. Though born in Nakhchivan, the family of Heydar Aliyev, longtime President of Azerbaijan and father of its current President, originated from Armenia; as a result he essentially had a double-origin and strong political base in Azerbaijan's Western clans. As the distribution of power in Azerbaijani politics is based on clan and familial ties, these two Western Azerbaijani clans have pushed other clans from power and formed a pyramidal web of patronage built around Nakhichevanis and Yerazi clan groups.

The leader of the Yeraz clan is Jalal Aliyev, uncle of Azerbaijani President Ilham Aliyev. Ramiz Mehtiev, the head of the President's Executive Body, is another prominent member. Before Jalal Aliyev, the unofficial leader of the Yerazi was Ali Insanov, a co-founder of the ruling New Azerbaijan Party and the former Health Minister of Azerbaijan for 12 years. Insanov and influential bureaucrat Akif Muradverdiyev were considered among the most powerful members of the Yerazi clan until they were sacked by President Ilham Aliyev for corruption before the November 2005 parliamentary elections.

The Yeraz have two non-political movements: "Ağrıdağ" (an Azerbaijani name for Mount Ararat) and the "Irevan Birliyi" (Yerevan Unity). Founded by Insanov, Ağrıdağ acted as a vehicle to spread the clan's influence at the national level, particularly over the country's health system.

== See also ==
- Deportation of Azerbaijanis from Armenia
- Western Azerbaijan (irredentist concept)
- Khanate of Erevan
- Islam in Armenia
