= Antono (name) =

Antono is an Esperanto masculine given name that is a form of Anthony, as well as a surname. Notable people with this name include the following:

== Given name ==
- Antono Refa, fictional character from Babylon 5, played by William Forward

== Surname ==
- Amat Antono (born 1958), Indonesian politician
- Ian Antono (born Jauw Hian Ling, 1950), Indonesian guitarist and songwriter

== See also ==
- Anton (given name)
- Anton (surname)
- Antona (name)
- Antone
- Antoni
- Antonio
- Antonov (surname)
- Antony
- Antoon
