= Andronovka =

Andronovka (Russian: Андроновка) is the name of several rural localities in Russia:

- Andronovka, Perm Krai, a village in Vereshchaginsky District of Perm Krai
- Andronovka, Ryazan Oblast, a village in Kazache-Dyukovsky Rural Okrug of Shatsky District in Ryazan Oblast
