= Anatoliy Kutsev =

Ukrainian footballer and manager

Personal information
- Full name: Anatoliy Mykolayovych Kutsev
- Date of birth: 20 April 1959
- Place of birth: Bendery, Moldavian SSR (present-day Moldova)
- Date of death: 26 June 2016 (aged 57)
- Position: Center back

Senior career*
Years	Team	Apps	(Gls)
1977–1978	Dnipro Dnipropetrovsk	2	(0)
1979	Nistru Kishinyov	7	(0)
1979–1980	Kolos Nikopol	13	(0)
1980–1981	Kryvbas Kryvyi Rih	60	(5)
1982–1983	SKA Kyiv	28	(1)
1984	Metalist Kharkiv	0	(0)
1984	Kryvbas Kryvyi Rih	26	(1)
1985–1988	Dynamo Bila Tserkva	158	(1)

Managerial career
- 1994–2000: Ukraine women's (assistant)
- 2001–2006: Ukraine U-19 women's
- 2007–2015: Ukraine women's
- * Club domestic league appearances and goals

Anatoliy Mikolayevich Kutsev (Ukrainian: Анато́лій Микола́йович Ку́цев; 20 April 1959 – 26 June 2016) was a Ukrainian football player and manager.

== Career ==
Kutsev began his playing career with FC Dnipro Dnipropetrovsk in the Soviet Top League before moving to several other clubs including FC Nistru Chişinău and FC CSKA Kyiv.
