= Andronovka, Perm Krai =

Village in Russia

Andronovka Андроновка
- Village
- Location within Perm Krai Location within Russia
- Coordinates: 58°01′N 54°27′E
- Country: Russia
- Region: Perm Krai
- District: Vereshchaginsky District
- Time zone: UTC+5:00

Andronovka (Russian: Андроновка) is a rural locality (a village) in Vereshchaginsky District, Perm Krai, Russia. The population was 53 as of 2010.

== Geography ==
Andronovka is located 20 km southwest of Vereshchagino, the district's administrative centre, by road. Denisovka and Putino are the nearest rural localities.
