= Oleg Antonov =

Oleg Antonov may refer to:

- Oleg Antonov (aircraft designer) (1906–1984), Soviet aircraft designer
- Oleg Antonov (volleyball) (born 1988), Russian-born Italian volleyball player
