= Dimitar Andonov =

Bulgarian officer and revolutionary

Captain Dimitar Andonov
- Димитър Андонов
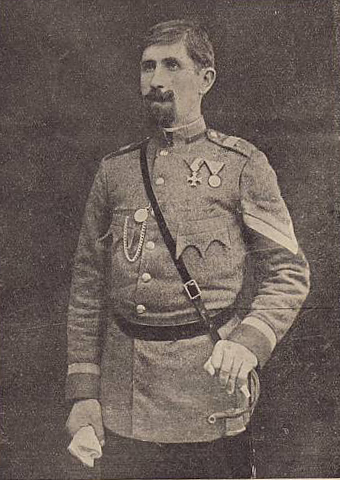
- Dimitar Andonov c. 1903–08
- Born: 26 March 1871; Stara Zagora, Adrianople Vilayet, Ottoman Empire (now Bulgaria)
- Died: 17 March 1917 (aged 45); Chervenata Stena, Bulgarian Occupied Serbia (now Baba, Republic of North Macedonia)
- Military career
- Allegiance: IMRO; Kingdom of Bulgaria
- Branch: Bulgarian Army
- Rank: Captain
- Conflicts: Macedonian Struggle; Ilinden Uprising; Balkan Wars; First Balkan War; Bulgarian front; Second Balkan War; World War I; Macedonian front †
- Awards: Distinguished Service Cross

Dimitar Andonov was a Bulgarian officer and revolutionary, a leader of an Internal Macedonian-Adrianople Revolutionary Organization (IMARO) revolutionary band for the Prilep region.

== Biography ==
Dimitar Andonov was born in 1871 in Stara Zagora, then part of the Ottoman Empire. He finished a military school for sergeants and served in the 12-th Infantry Balkan Battalion of the Bulgarian Army. On March 5, 1903, Dimitar Andonov, together with Nikola Valchev and Nestor Baykov, left the army. In Sofia, they connected with the foreign representation body of the revolutionary organization IMARO and in Kyustendil they joined the Prilep revolutionary band of Konstantin Kondov. Their fellow-townsman Georgi Staynov was already a member of this revolutionary band.

Part of Kostantin Kondov's revolutionary band entered into an ambush near the village of Toplica, as a result of which seven freedom fighters and the leader Nikola Bozhkov were killed. Dimitar Andonov and Nestor Baykov reorganized the band and managed to escape the ambush. Later, this section joined the revolutionary band of Petar Atsev. During the preparations of the Ilinden-Preobrazhenie Uprising, Dimitar Andonov was appointed head of the Prekoridski revolutionary region. He was responsible for the military training of the freedom fighters in this region.

During the uprising, Dimitar Andonov and Nestor Baykov fought two battles with the Ottoman Army near Dunje and Staravina and they organized the logistics for the transport of gunpowder and weaponry from Bitola to Prilep. They participated in the action led by Petar Atsev, in the village of Živovo, that was an unsuccessful attempt to take over the Ottoman garrison. They had other battles at the Nidže Mountain and the Farish Inns, in which they succeeded in disrupting the communication on the road between Prilep, Kavadarci and Krivolak. Gjorche Petrov refused their suggestion to attack the Ottoman garrisons in the town of Prilep.

At the end of the uprising, Dimitar Andonov returned in Bulgaria and again joined the military and served in his battalion. He participated in the Balkan Wars. During the First World War, on March 1, 1917, he was promoted to the rank of captain. On March 17, he died in the battle near Chervenata Stena (The Red Wall) against English and French battalions. On the occasion of his death, Petar Atsev wrote:

He put his life at the altar of our Fatherland, repulsed the enemy attacks against Chervenata Stena in the Pelister Mountain, above the town of Bitola. This strapping young man, a Bulgarian son, felt down, standing with wondrous calmness before his battalion. Torn into parts from a grenade, he remained in Pelister next to the graves of the glorious Ilinden freedom fighters from 1903. And his spirit waves above this tormented land, he gave everything for its freedom and at the end, he gave even his life, a life, that will serve as an example to the rising generation of Bulgaria and Macedonia.
