= Vadym Kharchenko =

Ukrainian footballer

Personal information
- Full name: Vadym Stepanovych Kharchenko
- Date of birth: 7 December 1975 (age 50)
- Place of birth: Sumy, Ukrainian SSR, Soviet Union
- Height: 1.75 m (5 ft 9 in)
- Position: Midfielder

Senior career*
Years	Team	Apps	(Gls)
1996–1997	Viktor Zaporizhzhia	46	(10)
1997–1999	Naftovyk Okhtyrka	75	(30)
1999–2002	Metalist Kharkiv	41	(4)
1999–2002	→ Metalist-2 Kharkiv	8	(3)
2002	Spartak Sumy	9	(2)
2003–2010	Naftovyk Okhtyrka	176	(19)
2010	Poltava	13	(0)
- * Club domestic league appearances and goals

Vadym Stepanovych Kharchenko (Ukrainian: Вадим Степанович Харченко; born 7 December 1975) is a Ukrainian football midfielder who played in the Ukrainian Premier League. He retired from playing in 2010.
