= Natalya Antonova =

Russian pianist and educator

Natalya Antonova (Russian: Наталия Антонова) is a Russian pianist and educator at the Eastman School of Music.

== Early life and career ==
Natalya began to study piano at the Saint Petersburg Conservatory when she was 4 years old. At 16, she made her first public appearance with the Saint Petersburg Philharmonic Orchestra, and shortly thereafter accepted a professorship at the Conservatory, as the youngest professor in the history of the school.

She then traveled Europe, participating in music festivals across the continent. After a decade of travel, she returned to Russia to work as a professor at Gnessin State Musical College. Later on, she became a lecturer at the Conservatoire de Paris, Peabody Institute and New England Conservatory following by becoming a faculty member of the Seoul National University. She also served as a jury at the Corpus Christi and both Hilton Head and the Gina Bachauer International Piano Competition. She played Chopin's Scherzo No. 1 and performed his Preludes as well at the Humboldt State University.

Today, Natalya continues to teach piano to music students, and regularly performs at classical venues, including Moscow Academy of Music, Conservatoire de Paris, the Franz Liszt Academy of Music, the Peabody Institute, the New England Conservatory of Music, Seoul National University, Singapore University, and National Taiwan University. Recordings of her music are available at the University of Rochester Sibley Music Library.

Natalya has quipped that her "only motivation is the love to make music."
