= Alfredo De Massis =

Italian business theorist

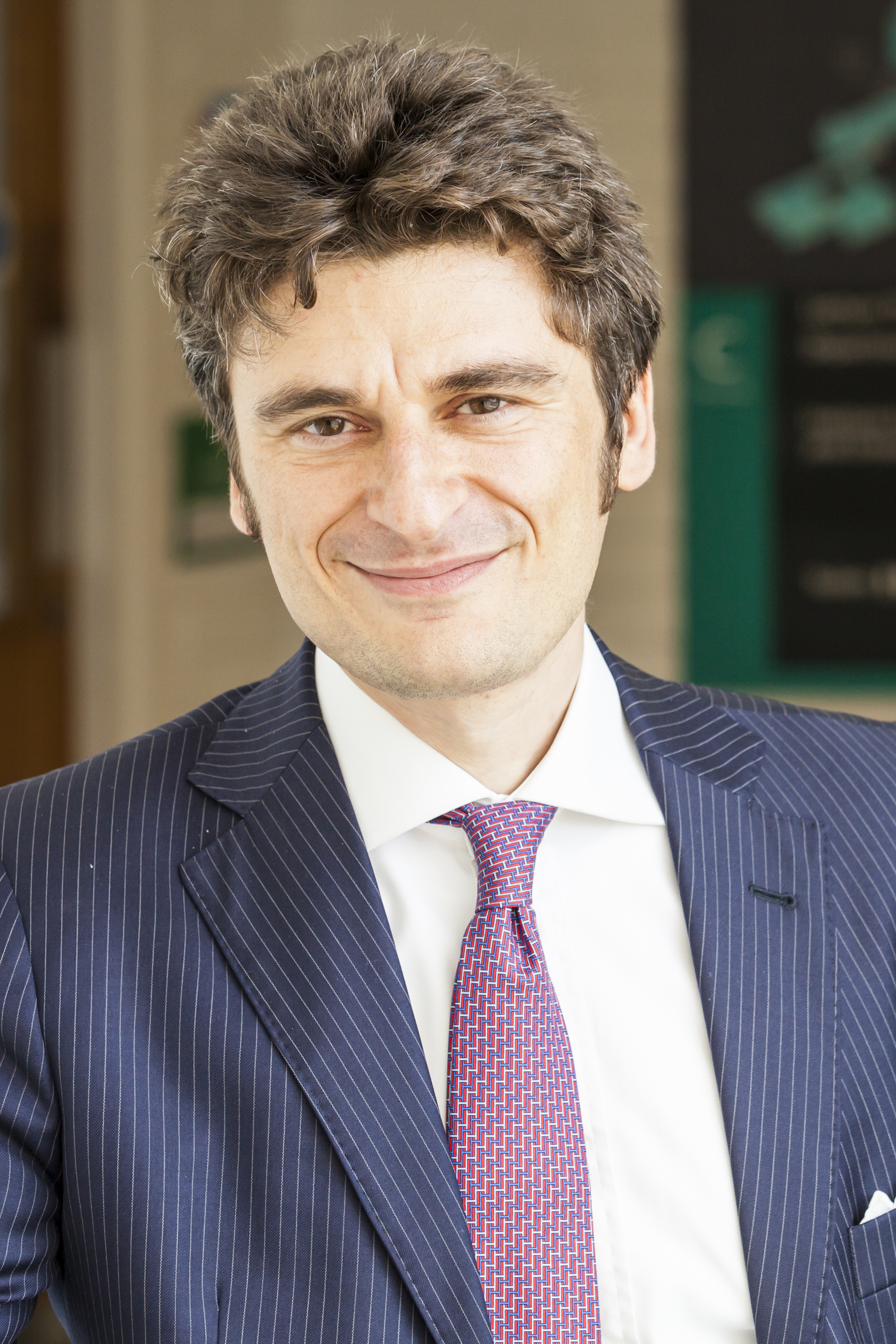
- Born: Pescara, Abruzzo, Italy
- Occupations: Professor of Entrepreneurship and Family Business

Academic work
- Institutions: Free University of Bozen-Bolzano, Lancaster University, International Institute for Management Development

Alfredo De Massis is a professor of Entrepreneurship and Family Business at the International Institute for Management Development (IMD) and at the Free University of Bozen-Bolzano. He chairs the Scientific Committee of FAmily Business Risorse per l'Italia and is a member of the Scientific Board of the Italian Family Officer Association (AIFO). According to Family Capital, De Massis is among the top 25 star professors of family business in the world. In 2022, he was nominated in the Family Capital's 100 Family Business Influencers list.

De Massis also serves as strategy consultant, executive advisor and coach to family enterprises in a variety of industries. According to his CV, this includes Accenture Strategy, SCS Consulting, and Borsa Italiana (London Stock Exchange Group). In 2017, he shared his experience about succession and family business management with the UK Parliament.

In 2016, several newspapers and TV programmes reported in 2016 that De Massis was the youngest full professor in Italy.

== Research ==
De Massis has been a guest editor of ten special issues on family business- and strategy-related topics in journals like Strategic Management Journal, Journal of Management Studies, Entrepreneurship Theory and Practice, Journal of Product Innovation Management, Global Strategy Journal, California Management Review, and Long Range Planning. His research has been featured in various media outlets including Financial Times, Harvard Business Review, CNBC, Campden FB, Tharawat Magazine, The Conversation, Il Sole 24 ORE, and he is regularly interviewed in TV programmes (e.g., “Porta a Porta”, a TV program hosted by the Italian journalist Bruno Vespa, which is broadcast on RAI1, Italy's leading national channel, and has played a central role in the Italian political scene), newspapers and magazines on family business and entrepreneurship issues.
