= Iona Andronov =

Russian politician (1934–2024)

- Иона Андронов

Member of the Congress of People's Deputies of Russia
- In office 16 May 1990 – 4 October 1993

Personal details
- Born: Iona Ionovich Andronov; 19 May 1934 Leningrad, Russian SFSR, USSR
- Died: 7 October 2024 (aged 90) Moscow, Russia
- Party: CPSU (until 1991)
- Education: Institute of Oriental Languages
- Occupation: Journalist

Iona Ionovich Andronov (Russian: Иона Ионович Андронов; 19 May 1934 – 7 October 2024) was a Russian journalist and politician. He served in the Congress of People's Deputies from 1990 to 1993.

Iona Andronov would claim that the CIA was behind the attempted assassination of Pope John Paul II with the help of Turkish assassin, Mehmet Ali Ağca in response to Western accusations that the attack was planned by the Soviets.

Andronov died in Moscow on 7 October 2024, at the age of 90.
