= Society for Japanese Arts =

The Society for Japanese Arts was founded in 1937 by a group of Dutch collectors of, and dealers in, Japanese art. Originally called The Society for Japanese Arts and Crafts, the society became international in the 1960s. It currently has over 550 members in 24 countries.

The Society sponsors lectures, exhibitions and publications. It awards grants through the Heinz M. Kaempfer Fund, and publishes the journal Andon (ISSN 0168-2997) in English, which provides results of research about various ukiyo-e artists, e.g. Utagawa Kunisada III.

== Publications ==
In addition to Andon and a quarterly Newsletter (ISSN 1877-3788), the Society's publications include:

- Forrer, Matthi, Willem R. van Gulik, Jack Hillier A Sheaf of Japanese Papers, The Hague, Society for Japanese Arts and Crafts, 1979. ISBN 90-70265-71-0
- Ing, Eric van den, Beauty and Violence, Japanese Prints by Yoshitoshi, 1839-1892, Bergeyk, Netherlands, Society for Japanese Arts, 1992. ISBN 90-70216-04-3
- Kaempfer, H. M. and W. O. G. Sickinghe The Fascinating World of the Japanese Artist. A Collection of Essays on Japanese Art by Members of the Society for Japanese Arts and Crafts, The Hague, Society for Japanese Arts and Crafts, 1971. ISBN 0-87093-156-3
- Kaempfer, H. M. (ed.), Ukiyo-e Studies and Pleasures, A Collection of Essays on the Art of Japanese Prints, The Hague, Society for Japanese Arts and Crafts, 1978. ISBN 90-70216-01-9
- Schaap, Robert, A Brush with Animals, Japanese Paintings, 1700-1950, Bergeijk, Society for Japanese Arts & Hotei Publishing, 2007. ISBN 978-90-70216-07-8
- Vos, F., et al., Meiji, Japanese Art in Transition, Ceramics, Cloisonné, Lacquer, Prints, Organized by the Society for Japanese Art and Crafts, 's-Gravenhage, the Netherlands, Gemeentemuseum, 1987. ISBN 90-70216-03-5
