= FC Naftovyk Okhtyrka =

Naftovyk
- Full name: Football Club Naftovyk Okhtyrka
- Founded: 1980, 2020
- Dissolved: 2018
- Ground: Naftovyk Stadium
- Capacity: 5,256
- President: Oleksandr Sikun
- Head coach: Anton Sikun
- League: Ukrainian Amateur League
- 2020: Championship of Sumy Oblast, 2nd
Home colours	Away colours

Old logo (2004–2018)

Coat of arms of Okhtyrka

Football Club Naftovyk Okhtyrka is a Ukrainian amateur football club based in Okhtyrka, Sumy Oblast, where it was founded in 1980. The name of the club means "oiler" in Ukrainian. Ukrnafta company owned the club between 2004 and 2018. The club was dissolved in July 2018, but refounded again in 2020.

== History ==
Naftovyk Okhtyrka was created as a team of the Oil and Gaz administration "Okhtyrkanaftogaz" (today part of Ukrnafta) in 1980.

Naftovyk Okhtyrka took part in the first Ukrainian Premier League season in 1992, after being initially chosen to participate for being the Ukrainian SSR Champion in 1991 (Note: republican level championships were part of Soviet Second League B). Naftovyk Okhtyrka took 8th place in its group that season and was demoted to the Persha Liha as a result. Since 2004 the club has been called FC Naftovyk-Ukrnafta Okhtyrka due to sponsorship from Ukrnafta. The club's crest carries the Okhtyrka city coat of arms. During the 2007–08 season, FC Naftovyk-Ukrnafta Okhtyrka finished 15th in the Ukrainian Premier League and was relegated back to Persha Liha and will play there during the 2008–09 season.

=== Football kits and sponsors ===
Years	Football kit	Shirt sponsor
2007–2008	nike	Ukrnafta

== Stadium ==
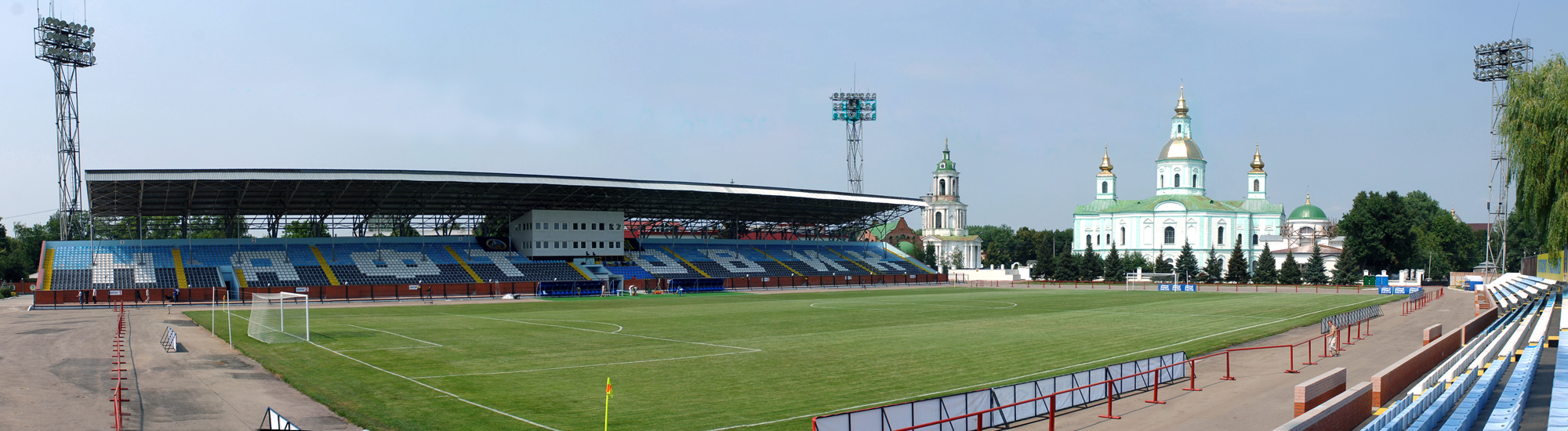
Stadium

Its home stadium, Naftovyk, has a capacity of 10,500. Also, it plays its home games in Sumy at the stadium, Yuvileinyi (Jubilee), which used to belong to Spartak as its home ground does not meet the required criteria for the Premier League and the European competitions. The club is planning to upgrade its stadium shortly.

== Reserves ==
The club has its reserve team, Naftovyk-2, that competes at Sumy Oblast football competitions and sometimes in Ukrainian amateur football competitions. In 1999, Naftovyk-2 made its debut in Ukrainian amateur football competitions.

== Current squad ==
Note: Flags indicate national team as defined under FIFA eligibility rules; some limited exceptions apply. Players may hold more than one non-FIFA nationality.

No.	Pos.	Nation	Player
4	DF	UKR	Oleksandr Khomych
7	FW	UKR	Oleksandr Vasylchenko
8	MF	UKR	Serhiy Kisil
10		UKR	Maksym Vashchenko
11	FW	UKR	Roman Yakymenko
15	DF	UKR	Oleksiy Pokosenko
17	MF	UKR	Ivan Mryachenko
18	FW	UKR	Ruslan Tabachun
21	DF	UKR	Oleksandr Lapin (captain)
22	MF	UKR	Oleksandr Vasylyev
23		UKR	Serhiy Makarenko

No.	Pos.	Nation	Player
26		UKR	Vitaliy Bala
30	DF	UKR	Dmytro Ishchenko
41	FW	UKR	Dmytro Zharikov
42	DF	UKR	Vladyslav Yemelyanov
87		UKR	Ihor Tsema
—	DF	UKR	Dmytro Antonov
—		UKR	Valentyn Biryuk
—		UKR	Roman Honchar
—		UKR	Artur Maslo
—	FW	UKR	Kostyantyn Rud
—		UKR	Bohdan Tsokur

== Honors ==
- Ukrainian Cup
  - Runners up (1): 1990
- Republican championship
  - Winners (1): 1991
- Ukrainian First League
  - Winner (1): 2006–07

== League and cup history ==
Season	Div.	Pos.	Pl.	W	D	L	GS	GA	P	Domestic Cup	Europe	Notes
1992	1st	12	18	5	3	10	12	28	13	1/4 finals		Relegated
1992–93	2nd	3	42	22	10	10	73	41	54	1/16 finals		
1993–94	2nd	5	38	19	10	9	57	28	48	1/32 finals		
1994–95	2nd	5	42	23	3	16	69	51	72	1/128 finals		
1995–96	2nd	8	42	18	12	12	52	37	66	1/32 finals		
1996–97	2nd	5	46	25	6	15	76	43	81	1/32 Second stage		
1997–98	2nd	8	42	19	10	13	56	50	67	1/8 finals		
1998–99	2nd	8	38	16	9	13	45	40	57	1/32 finals		
1999-00	2nd	14	34	13	5	16	42	51	44	1/16 finals		Relegated
2000–01	3rd "C"	1	30	24	3	3	65	20	75	Did not enter		Promoted
2001–02	2nd	7	34	13	10	11	35	32	49	1/32 finals		
2002–03	2nd	4	34	15	9	10	37	26	54	1/16 finals		
2003–04	2nd	3	34	17	11	6	52	33	62	1/16 finals		
2004–05	2nd	10	34	13	10	11	37	26	49	1/4 finals		
2005–06	2nd	4	34	17	7	10	50	35	58	1/16 finals		
2006–07	2nd	1	36	27	2	7	58	29	83	1/32 finals		Promoted
2007–08	1st	15	30	6	8	16	28	38	26	1/4 finals		Relegated
2008–09	2nd	12	32	11	11	10	41	42	41	1/32 finals		–3
2009–10	2nd	7	34	17	6	11	45	37	57	1/16 finals		
2010–11	2nd	14	34	10	11	13	40	44	41	1/8 finals		
2011–12	2nd	10	34	12	8	14	49	43	44	1/32 finals		
2012–13	2nd	5	34	15	9	10	39	31	54	1/32 finals		
2013–14	2nd	7	30	12	7	11	40	35	43	1/32 finals		
2014–15	2nd	12	30	10	10	10	32	34	40	1/16 finals		
2015–16	2nd	9	30	11	7	12	31	33	40	1/16 finals		
2016–17	2nd	6	34	15	9	10	47	29	54	1/4 finals		
2017–18	2nd	15	34	8	9	17	27	42	33	1/32 finals		Relegated and withdraw

== Head coaches ==
- (Ukraine) Serhiy Shevchenko (2001–2007)
- (Ukraine) Valeriy Horodov (24 August 2007 – 16 November 2008)
- (Ukraine) Serhiy Shevchenko (5 Aug 2009 – 27 Jun 2010)
- (Ukraine) Serhiy Mizin (27 Jun 2010 – 2011)

== See also ==
- FC Fakel Varva
- FC Trostianets
