= Masis (given name) =

Masis or Massis (Armenian: Մասիս) is an Armenian masculine given name that may refer to

- Masis Aram Gözbek (born 1987), Turkish musician, conductor and composer
- Masis Hambarsounian (born 1951), Armenian-Iranian boxer
- Masis Voskanyan (born 1990), Armenian football player
