= Dmytro Antonov =

Ukrainian footballer (born 1996)

Personal information
- Full name: Dmytro Ihorovych Antonov
- Date of birth: 28 August 1996 (age 30)
- Place of birth: Ukraine
- Height: 1.79 m (5 ft 10 in)
- Position: Defender

Team information
- Current team: Naftovyk Okhtyrka

Youth career
- 2009–2013: Metalist Kharkiv

Senior career*
Years	Team	Apps	(Gls)
2013–2015	Metalist Kharkiv	1	(0)
2015	Start Chuhuiv (amateurs)	2	(0)
2018	Tsementnyk Balakliya (amateurs)	1	(0)
2020	Mayak Valky (amateurs)	9	(0)
2020–2021	Metal Kharkiv	2	(0)
2021–	Naftovyk Okhtyrka (amateurs)	0	(0)
- * Club domestic league appearances and goals as of 13 October 2021

Dmytro Ihorovych Antonov (Ukrainian: Дмитро Ігорович Антонов; born 28 August 1996) is a professional Ukrainian football defender who plays for Naftovyk Okhtyrka in the Ukrainian Amateur League.

== Career ==
Antonov is a product of the Metalist Kharkiv System.

He made his debut for Metalist Kharkiv in the match against Dynamo Kyiv on 1 March 2015 in the Ukrainian Premier League.

In May 2015, Antonov was disqualified for 4 years by FFU Control and Disciplinary Committee for the use of a prohibited substance metandienone.
