= Studies in History =

- Discipline: History
- Language: English
- Edited by: Kunal Chakrabarti, Aditya Mukherjee and Joy Pachuau

Publication details
- History: 1985
- Publisher: SAGE Publications (India)
- Frequency: Biannual

Standard abbreviations
- ISO 4: Stud. Hist.

Indexing
- ISSN: 0257-6430 (print); 0973-080X (web)

Links
- Journal homepage; Online access; Online archive

Studies in History is a peer-reviewed journal that provides a forum to discuss the considerable expansion and diversification that has occurred in historical research in India in recent years.

It is published twice in a year by SAGE Publications in association with Jawaharlal Nehru University, New Delhi

== Abstracting and indexing ==
Studies in History is abstracted and indexed in:

- DeepDyve
- SCOPUS
- Portico
- Dutch-KB
- Pro-Quest-RSP
- Worldwide Political Science Abstracts - ProQuest
- Thomson Reuters: Emerging Sources Citation Index (ESCI)
- EBSCO
- ICI
- J-Gate
- OCLC
- Sociological Abstracts – ProQuest
- Bibliography of Asian Studies (BAS)
