= Peter Andronov =

Bulgarian financier and banker

- Петър Андронов
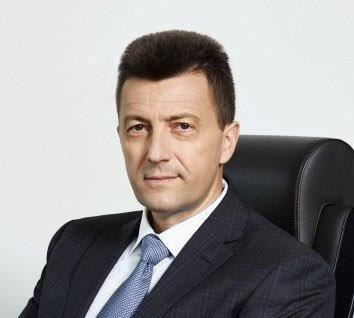
- Born: 1969 (age 56–57); Dobrich, Bulgaria
- Education: University of National and World Economy
- Occupations: Financier and banker

Peter Andronov (born 1969) is a Bulgarian financier and banker.

Since 2021, he has been a Member of the executive committee of KBC Group, KBC Bank and KBC Insurance Executive Director and CEO International Markets in charge of the Group's business in four of its core markets – Bulgaria, Hungary, Slovakia and Ireland, as well as chairman of the Board of Directors of KBC Asset Management. In the same year, 2021, he also becomes Chairman of the Supervisory Boards of UBB, DZI, K&H Bank and K&H Insurance in Hungary, CSOB Bank Slovakia, and chairman of the Board of Directors of KBC Bank Ireland. As of April 2025, he is CEO of the International Markets business line and Chairman of the Supervisory Boards of UBB and DZI.

He is a member of The Trilateral Commission.

== Biography ==
Born in 1969 in the town of Dobrich, he graduated from the language school in town. He continued his education at the University of National and World Economy in Sofia, where he graduated with a master's degree in finance and banking. After graduating, he pursued a career in the banking sector, where he successively held the positions of an analyst and expert at commercial banks and in 1997 he started working at the banking supervision department, of which he became Chief Director in 2001.

Over this period, he participated in and led processes on developing banking legislation in Bulgaria, including the Credit Institutions Act, the Financial Conglomerates Act, the Consumer Loans Act, ordinances of the Central Bank and others.

Between 1995 and 2016 he taught over different spans of time at the University of National and World Economy, the Higher School of Insurance and Finance and the New Bulgarian University/ International Banking Institute. Between 2017 and 2024 he was a member of the board of trustees at the University of National and World Economy and between 2020 and 2024 – of the board of trustees at Sofia University St. Kliment Ohridski.

From 2004 to mid-2007, he was initially an observer and subsequently a member of the Committee of European Banking Supervisors (CEBS), the European Banking Committee (EBC) of the European Commission, and the Banking Supervisory Committee (BSC) of the ECB in Frankfurt.

From 2008 to 2021. Petar Andronov is a member of the Board of the Association of Banks in Bulgaria and for two terms - from 2015 to 2018 and from 2018 to 2021 - he is also its chairman.

== Career ==
His professional career started in 1994 as an analyst, expert and Head of Analysis and Methodology Department in commercial banks. Between 1997 and 2007 he worked at the Bulgarian National Bank. Between 2002 and 2007 he was the chief director of the Banking Supervision Department. Between 2002 and 2007 he was a member of the Investment Committee of the Bulgarian National bank.

Andronov's career continued in the private sector in July 2007, when he was appointed executive director for Risk and Finance at CIBANK. In the same year, KBC Group acquired CIBANK and from the beginning of 2008 he was appointed chief executive officer.

Following the acquisition of UBB by the Belgian financial group, since June 2017 up until May 2021 Peter Andronov was chairman of the management board and chief executive officer of UBB AD, a result of the merger between CIBANK and the former UBB. Between March 2011 and May 2021 Peter Andronov also held the position of KBC Group Country Manager for Bulgaria, which included the management of the other companies of the Group in the country, including DZI.

In 2017 he was chairman of the Board of Directors of UBB-MetLife, when KBC Group acquired it the same year.

In 2021 Peter Andronov was appointed member of the management board of KBC Group and CEO International Markets in charge of the Group's business in four of its core markets – Bulgaria, Hungary, Slovakia and Ireland. At the same time, he became chairman of the Board of Directors of KBC Asset Management.

== Honours ==
He is a multiple winner (2009, 2015, 2018, 2020 and 2021) of the Banker of the Year Award. He has also won the Manager of the Year Award and the Burov Prize for Bank Management. He has been selected as "Mr. Economy". In 2015, he received the Order of Service of the Crown of the Kingdom of Belgium.

In 2016, he won the "Manager of the Year Award".
