= Minangkabau clans =

The Minangkabau clans or Minangkabau tribes (Minangkabau: Suku-suku, sing. Suku) are traditional first degree kinship groups of Minangkabau people of Sumatra, Indonesia and Negeri Sembilan in the Malay Peninsula sharing a common surname and heritage and existing in a lineage-based society prior to the 5th century. These clans form the base of a nagari and are descended matrilineally. They are further divided into perut or paruik (lit. 'stomach') led by a buapak (from ibu bapa 'parents').

== History ==
According to the Tambo of the Minangkabau, the clans are grouped into several big groups, known as kalarehan. These main clan groups are divided into either the Katumanggungan group or Parpatiah group. In the beginning, there were only two clans in each system. So, there were four main clans. These clans are Koto and Piliang from the Katumanggungan, and also Bodi and Caniago from Parpatiah Nan Sabatang. Later, the system of Katumanggungan was called the Koto-Piliang system and the Perpatih system was called the Bodi-Caniago system.

The Koto-Piliang System and the Bodi-Caniago System developed differently. These systems formed their own governing system based on their ideologies. The Koto-Piliang are based on aristocracy while Bodi-Caniago are based on confederation.

These clans' name are believed to have originated from Sanskrit. As well as, Koto originated from the word kotta which means 'citadel', Piliang originated from the agglutination of the word phili which means 'to be chosen' and hyang which means 'god', which means 'the God's choice', Bodi originated from the word bodhi which means 'civilized' and Caniago originated from the agglutination of the word chana which means 'someone' and 'aga' which means 'valuable'. This is same for the other clans in Minangkabau that developed in the Buddhism era of Pagaruyung which Sanskrit was used widely as a liturgical language and cultural title along with Pali. Some clans' name were changed to adapt with the Islam after its arrival.

Some of the new clans developed from the main clans due to differences in understanding and outlook in terms of customs. The new matrilineal clans also developed in Negeri Sembilan along with the Minangkabau migrant waves from Pagaruyung to Negeri Sembilan circa 17th-18th century. Some of them were named by the place of origin of the migrant groups from Pagaruyung and other were named after the Minangkabau groups that intermarried with the Orang Asli, Malay, Javanese and Acehnese. Some clans may be determined by the Kings of the Pagaruyung. Now, no new clans are created.

== See also ==
- List of Minangkabau clans
- Minangkabau Highlands
- Minangkabau language
- Minangkabau people
