= Vladimir Antonov =

Vladimir Antonov may refer to:

- Vladimir Antonov (businessman) (born 1975), banking fraudster
- Vladimir Antonov-Ovseyenko (1883–1938), Soviet Bolshevik leader and diplomat
- Vladimir Antonov (architect), Russian architect
