= Eugenia Vanina =

Russian Indologist (born 1957)

Eugenia Yurevna Vanina
- Евгения Юрьевна Ванина
- Born: December 24, 1957 (age 68)
- Citizenship: Soviet Union; Russia
- Occupations: Historian; Indologist
- Known for: Historical processes, analysis of Indian texts

Academic background
- Education: Doctor of Historical Sciences
- Alma mater: Institute of Asian and African Countries, Moscow State University
- Thesis: Medieval Indian Mindscapes: Space, Time, Society, Man (2006)

Academic work
- Discipline: Ethnography; History; Indology
- Institutions: Institute of Oriental Studies of the Russian Academy of Sciences
- Notable works: Ideas and Society in India from the Sixteenth to the Eighteenth Centuries (1996)

Eugenia Yurevna Vanina (born 24 December 1957) is a Russian Indologist, head of the History and Culture section and a researcher in the Centre for Indian Studies at the Institute of Oriental Studies of the Russian Academy of Sciences. She is known for her analyses of textual material from north and central India, and her studies of historical processes.

== Life ==
Eugenia Vanina studied at the University of Delhi between 1979 and 1980, training in Hindi and Sanskrit. She defended her Candidate of Sciences thesis, titled Urban handicraft production in North India, 16th-18th centuries in 1984 at the Institute of Asian and African Countries, Moscow State University. She obtained her higher doctoral degree of Doktor nauk in 2006 with her dissertation titled Medieval Indian Mindscapes: Space, Time, Society, Man.

== Career ==
Vanina's 1996 publication of Ideas and Society in India from the Sixteenth to the Eighteenth Centuries (an English language translation of her Russian volume from 1993) restricted the notion of 'medieval India' to the period between Akbar and the end of the Mughal Empire, and was a comparative analysis of trends in Western Europe and India. She introduced her idea of social processes and noted that these drove society from feudalism to capitalism via new forms of authoritarianism. She compared the bhakti and Sufi tradition in India with the European reformation. The latter, she claimed, led to the abolition of feudalism, while the former, among other processes, led to the same in India only in the 19th century. These processes were, for example, the centralising worldly power of the Mughal emperor versus religious law. Critics called her concept of social processes as 'nebulous', while the lack of attention to Timurid forms of governance and the concentration on Hindu traditions of rulership was also criticised.

In her work titled Medieval Indian Mindscapes: Space, Time, Society, Man, Vanina stated that Marxist analyses concentrated on the socio-economic, ignoring the material and spiritual. To remedy the lacuna, Vanina applied social and cultural categories that implied that India between the 1st to the 18th centuries was feudal. Her comparison of the Indian worldview with that of the European suggested that both sets of societies underwent the same 'mental programme'. Her synthesis of the entire cultural development of medieval India as equivalent to 'feudal', however, was questioned by some critics, and her application of the Marxist notion of base and superstructure was criticised. Meanwhile, other critics claimed that her proposed model of studying spaces as sacred places, cyclical time, hierarchical social estates, and the opposition of the individual versus society, is not coherent enough to establish her claimed similarity with Western feudalism. Vanina analysed the notion of 'feudalism' as applied to India, on the one hand rejecting it as insufficient from a historiographical perspective, while on the other, inferring from her overarching definition of 'man' and 'society' as essentially on par with feudalism. Critics nevertheless appreciated the insights drawn from her close readings from medieval texts, albeit with the caveat of their restriction to north and central India, and the lack of female voices.

== Selected works ==
=== Articles ===
- Vanina, E. (1989). "Urban Industries of Medieval India: Some Aspects of Development". Studies in History. 5 (2). SAGE: 271–286. doi:10.1177/025764308900500205. ISSN 0257-6430. S2CID 161303692.
- Vanina, E. (1995). "The Ardhakathanaka by Banarasi Das: a Socio-cultural Study". Journal of the Royal Asiatic Society. 5 (2). Cambridge University Press (CUP): 211–224. doi:10.1017/s1356186300015352. ISSN 1356-1863. S2CID 164014497.
- Vanina, E. (2001). "India: The Whole and its Parts in Historical Perspective". Indian Historical Review. 28 (1–2). SAGE Publications: 84–110. doi:10.1177/037698360102800206. ISSN 0376-9836. S2CID 140390785.
- Vanina, E. (2002). "Reforms and Modernization in the Eighteenth Century Deccan States". In A.R. Kulkarni; M.A. Nayeem; A. Ray; K.S. Mathew (eds.). Studies in History of the Deccan: Medieval and Modern. New Delhi: Pragati. ISBN 9788173070754.
- Vanina, E. (2013). "Roads of (Mis)Understanding: European Travellers in India (Fifteenth to Seventeenth Century)". Indian Historical Review. 40 (2). SAGE Publications: 267–284. doi:10.1177/0376983613499678. ISSN 0376-9836. S2CID 143822799.

=== Books ===
- E. Vanina (1991). Средневековое городское ремесло Индии, XIII—XVIII вв. Moscow. ISBN 5020168890.
- E. Vanina (1993). Идеи и общество в Индии XVI—XVIII вв [Ideas and Society: India Between the Sixteenth and Eighteenth Centuries]. Moscow: Nauka. ISBN 5020176672.
- E. Vanina (2007). Средневековое мышление. Индийский вариант. Moscow: Vostochnaya Literatura. ISBN 9785020363267.
- E. Vanina; D.N. Jha, eds. (2009). Mind over Matter: Essays on Mentalities in Medieval India. Chennai: Tulika. ISBN 9788189487478.
- E. Vanina (2012). Medieval Indian Mindscapes: Space, Time, Society, Man. New Delhi: Primus Books. ISBN 9789380607191.
