= Barnaul Law Institute =

Education organization in Barnaul, Russia

Coordinates: 53.3429°N 83.7872°E

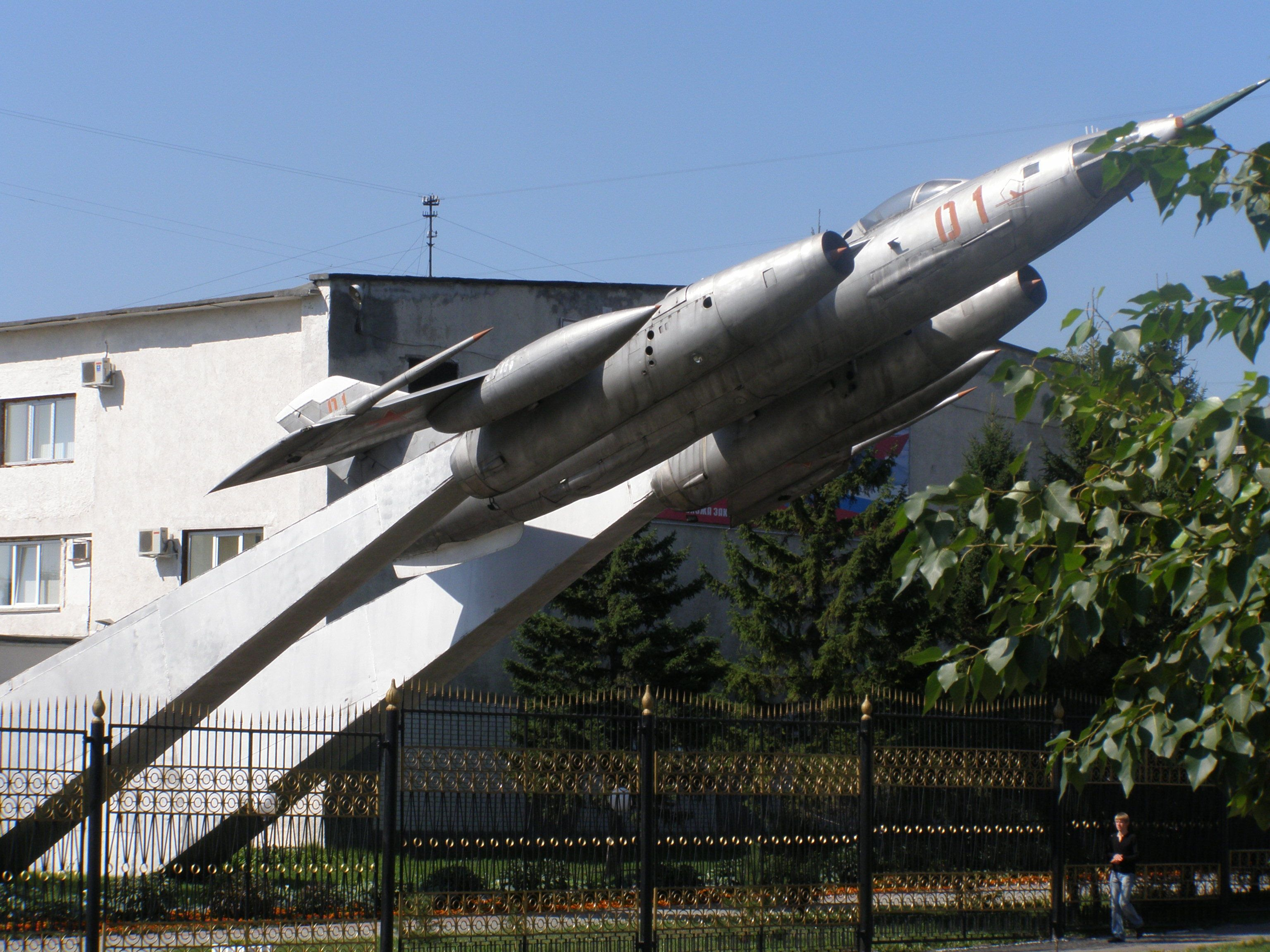
A Yak-28 at the institute.

The Barnaul Law Institute of the Ministry of Internal Affairs of Russia (Russian: Барнаульский юридический институт МВД России) is a higher institution of the Ministry of Internal Affairs of the Russia located in Barnaul, Altai Territory. It is one of the leading educational organizations of the MVD.

== History ==
It was founded on 29 June 1957 as the Special Secondary School for the Training of the Commanding Staff of the Ministry of Internal Affairs of the Soviet Union. In 1994, it was transformed into a branch of the Ryazan Higher School of the Ministry of Internal Affairs, and in 1998, the national government ordered the establishment of the modern institution. In 1999, the Russian Air Force disbanded the Barnaul Higher Military Aviation Pilot School in the central district, after which the institute was moved to its former facilities.

== Activities and student life ==
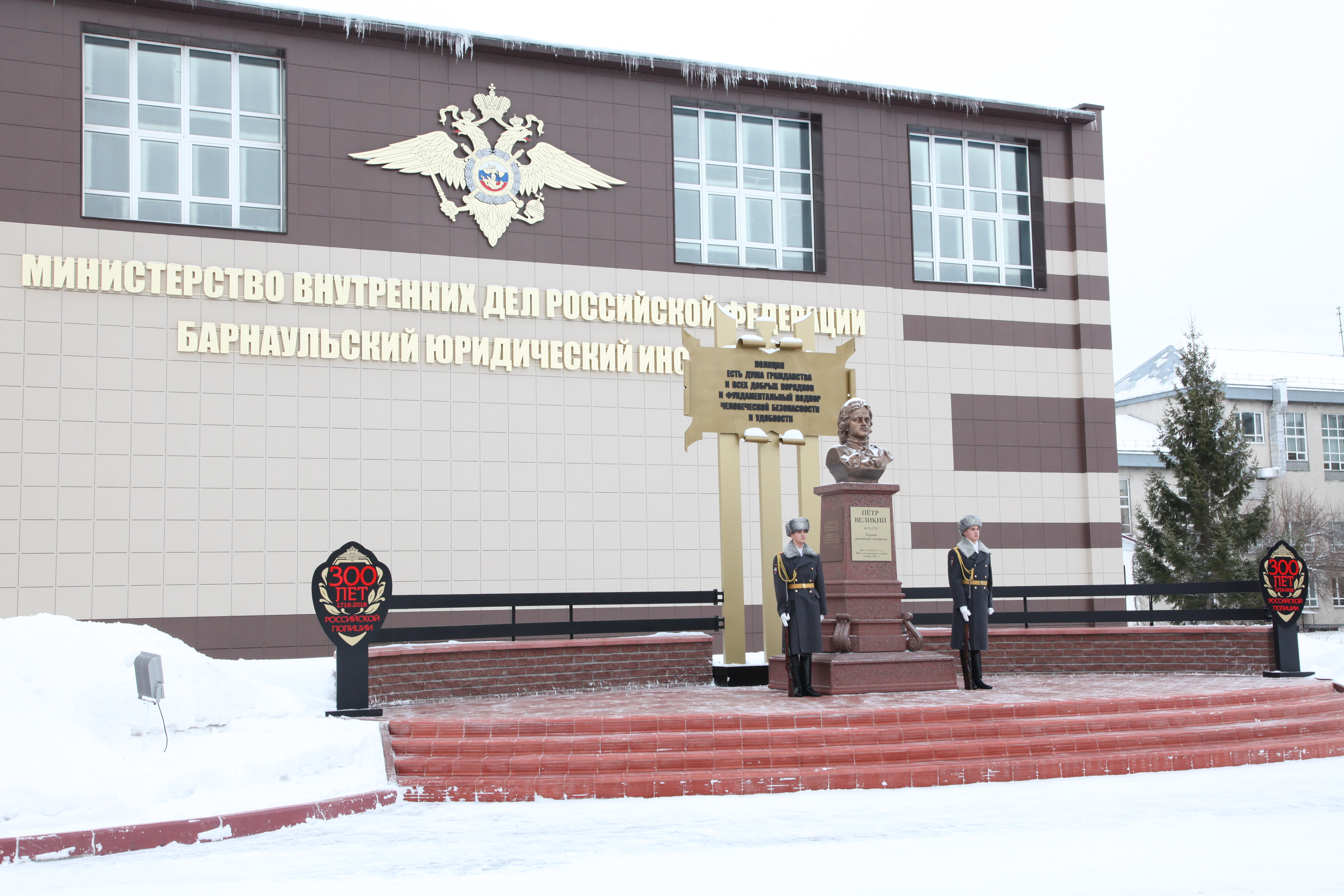
Members of the honour guard platoon at the institute building.

The institute primarily trains district police officers, with graduates of the institute also often serving in other MVD police departments. Students of the faculty of distance learning are police employees in the Siberian and Far Eastern Federal Districts. Students study at 4 faculties (Faculty of Police and Investigator Training, Faculty of Distance Learning, Faculty of Vocational Training and the Faculty of Advanced Training). It also operates over 10 educational departments. The Barnaul Law Institute also engages in scientific research. In optional classes, cadets learn table etiquette, communication ethics, learn and ballroom dancing. The creative teams of the institute include a brass band, a percussion ensemble and vocal groups. The Honour Guard Platoon of the institute was formed in 2011. The cadets in the unit were conscripted from the Kremlin Regiment of the Federal Protection Service in Moscow. It is considered to the hallmark of the institute, being annual participant in the Barnaul Garrison's Victory Day Parade in honor of the end of the Second World War, as well as celebrations of the city and the territory.

== Symbols ==
The emblem of the Barnaul Law Institute consists of an MVD shield and additional decorations in the form of an overhead figure above the shield and the motto (Service to Russia, Service to the Law) under the shield. In the upper part of the shield is a blue field depicting smoke coming from a furnace, which is the coat of arms of the city of Barnaul. In the lower half of the shield, a silver open book on the background known as the Golden Pillar of Law is depicted with two golden crossed swords in a scabbard. The emblem and badge were approved by order of Interior Minister Vladimir Kolokoltsev on 3 April 2013 and are currently entered in the Heraldic Register of the MVD. The flag of the institute that features this emblem was presented to it on 25 October 2014 by Major General Ivan Birnik to the Head of the Institute, Colonel Alexander Andreyev.
