= List of Minangkabau clans =

List of clans of Minangkabau

== Native Minangkabau clans ==
=== A ===
- Ampu

=== B ===
- Banuhampu
- Banuo
- Bapayuang
- Baraguang
- Barajo
- Batu Kambiang
- Batu Pahek
- Bawang
- Bandang (including Bandang Ateh Bukik, Bandang Rumah Baru, Bandang Salek)
- Bendang
- Bicu (including Bicu Sajo, Bicu Sipanjang)
- Bilang Ijin
- Bodi (including Bodi Batino, Bodi Caniago, Bodi Jantan)

=== C ===
- Caniago (including Caniago Baruah, Caniago Bawah, Caniago Nan Baranam, Caniago Sabarang, Caniago Ujuang)
- Cocoh
- Cubadak
- Cupak

=== D ===
- Datuak Kitan Putiah
- Dalimo (including Dalimo Panjang)
- Dendang
- Depati (including Depati Manggumi, Depati Mudo, Depati Sakungkuang)
- Domo
- Durian nan Limo Ruang

=== G ===
- Gantiang
- Guci

=== H ===
- Hapai nan Tigo Ibu

=== J ===
- Jambak (including Jambak nan Balimo)

=== K ===
- Kabaru
- Kalumpang
- Kampai (including Kampai Aia Angek nan Baranam, Kampai nan Duo Puluah Ampek, Kampai Tangah Niua Gadiang nan Baranam)
- Kampuang Dalam
- Kampuang Gadang
- Karak
- Kinari
- Korong Gadang
- Koto (including Koto Dalimo, Koto Diateh, Koto Kaciak, Koto Kaciak Ampek Paruaik, Koto Kampuang, Koto Kerambil, Koto Piliang, Koto Sipanjang)
- Kutianyia (including Kutianyia Baruah, Kutianyia Ikua Pancah, Kutianyia Kampuang Tangah, Kutianyia Kapalo Bancah, Kutianyia Kapalo Labuah, Kutianyia Pitopang, Kutianyia Tabel Lintang)

=== L ===
- Laweh
- Lubuak
- Lubuak Batuang

=== M ===
- Maih
- Malayu (including Malayu Badarah Putiah, Malayu Baduak, Malayu Balai, Malayu Baruah, Malayu Bandang, Malayu Bongsu, Malayu Basa, Malayu Bungo, Malayu Cikarau, Malayu Gandang Parak, Malayu Kumbuak Candi, Malayu Kumbuak Harum, Malayu Lampai, Malayu Lua, Malayu Panjang, Malayu Patar, Malayu Siat, Malayu Talang, Malayu Tobo, Malayu Tangah)
- Mandaliko (including Mandaliko Budur, Mandaliko Tangah Gadang, Mandaliko Tangah Patah)
- Mandahiliang (including Mandahiliang Panai, Mandahiliang Gadang, Madahiliang Subarang)
- Mansiang
- Marajo Basa
- Marajo Lelo
- Mejan

=== N ===
- Nangkapuh (Kandang Kapuh)
- Nan Sambilan

=== P ===
- Paga Cancang
- Pamangku
- Panampuang
- Pangian Kaciak
- Panyalai
- Parik (including Parik Cancang)
- Parindari
- Payobada (including Payobada Ateh, Payobada Kubang, Payobada Sungkai, Payobada Kunpanjang)
- Piliang (including Piliang Barum, Piliang Bongsu, Piliang Cocoh, Piliang Dalam, Piliang Koto, Piliang Koto Kaciak, Piliang Laweh, Piliang Patar, Piliang Sani, Piliang Sati)
- Pisang
- Pinyangek
- Pitopang (including Pitopang Basah, Pitopang Darek, Pitopang Dibawah, Pitopang Ditangah, Pitopang Gadang, Pitopang Koto Tuo, Pitopang Lado, Pitopang Rumah Panjang)
- Panggang
- Pungkuik

=== R ===
- Rabu
- Rio Mudo
- Rao

=== S ===
- Saibi
- Salo (including Salo-Kutianyia, Salo-Caniago)
- Sambilan Niniak
- Saratuih
- Sawah Jauah
- Seboang
- Sialiali
- Sikumbang (including Sikumbang Ampek Ibu, Sikumbang Gadang)
- Simabua
- Sumagek
- Sunan Sarajo
- Sinapa (Sungai Napar)
- Supanjang

=== T ===
- Tabek Gadang
- Tali Kincia
- Tangah Sawah
- Tanian
- Tanika
- Tanjuang (including Tanjuang Batu, Tanjuang Gadang, Tanjuang Talago)
- Tapi Aia
- Tigo Lareh

== Diasporic Minangkabau clans ==
=== A ===
- Anak Aceh
- Anak Malako

=== B ===
- Batu Balang
- Batu Hampar (abbreviated as Tompar)
- Biduando (abbreviated as Dondo, including Biduando Lelo Maharajo Warih Jakun, Biduando Sadia Rajo Warih Jao, Biduando Sari Maharajo, Biduando Tampin)

=== M ===
- Mungka

=== P ===
- Payakumbuh

=== R ===
- Rao

=== S ===
- Sari Lamak (abbreviated as Solomak)
- Simalanggang (including Simalanggang Minangkabau, Simalanggang Naning, Simalanggang Ampek Ibu, Simalanggang Minangkabau Kandung, Simalanggang Rokan, Simalanggang Panglima Bongsu)

=== T ===
- Talu
- Tanah Data
- Tigo Batu
- Tigo Niniak

== See also ==
- Minangkabau clans
- Minangkabau Highlands
- Minangkabau language
- Minangkabau people
