= Hennadiy Skidan =

Ukrainian footballer

Personal information
- Full name: Hennadiy Viktorovych Skidan
- Date of birth: 24 July 1973 (age 53)
- Place of birth: Simferopol, Ukrainian SSR, Soviet Union
- Position: Forward

Senior career*
Years	Team	Apps	(Gls)
1992	Inturyst Yalta		
1992	Frunzenets Frunze	6	(2)
1993	Tavriya Simferopol	12	(0)
1995–1996	Kryvbas Kryvyi Rih	25	(3)
1997–1998	SC Mykolaiv	39	(22)
1998	Karpaty Lviv	1	(0)
1998	→ Karpaty-2 Lviv	2	(1)
1999	Prykarpattia Ivano-Frankivsk	16	(5)
2000–2002	Polissya Zhytomyr	24	(15)
- * Club domestic league appearances and goals

Hennadiy Skidan (Ukrainian: Геннадій Вікторович Скідан; born 24 July 1973) is a retired professional Ukrainian football forward.

Along with Oleh Hrytsai, Skidan became the highest scorer when he scored 22 goals for SC Mykolaiv during the 1997–98 Ukrainian First League season.
