= Koka Antonova =

Russian indologist (1910–2007)

K. A. Antonova
- Born: 10 [23] March 10 1910; Saint Petersburg
- Died: 3 February 2007 (aged 96); Moscow
- Education: Moscow State University
- Scientific career
- Fields: History of medieval and modern India
- Workplaces: Institute of Oriental Studies of the Russian Academy of Sciences
- Doctoral advisor: I. M. Reisner

Koka Aleksandrovna Antonova (Russian: Ко́ка Алекса́ндровна Анто́нова; 10 [23] March 1910, Saint Petersburg – 3 February 2007, Moscow, Russia) was a Soviet Indologist specializing in medieval and modern Indian history. A researcher at the Institute of Oriental Studies of the Russian Academy of Sciences, she was a co-author of a comprehensive four-volume History of India in the Russian language.

== Life and career ==
Koka Aleksandrovna Antonova was born in a Czarist prison in 1910 in Saint Petersburg in a family of revolutionaries. Her mother was a member of the Russian Social Democratic Labour Party from 1904, while her father joined in April 1917. She went to school in Brighton, leaving with fluent command over English, French and German, to which she was later to add Urdu, Arabic, Spanish and Persian.

In 1931, she graduated from Moscow State University and started teaching British politics at the Institute of World Economy and Politics. In 1936, she began doctoral studies, supervised by I.M. Reisner.

Antonova married Vladimir Turok-Popov, a historian of modern Europe.

Following her mother's arrest, she was treated as a family member of a traitor to the Motherland and exiled to Siberia in 1937. She along with Reisner had been denounced by the Indian communist Abani Mukherji as a Trotskyite and an enemy of the people; her critiques of his publications added to the spread of mass repression, in which Mukherji perished. Her husband joined her in exile. She was allowed to return to Moscow in 1939 to continue her studies.

She defended her dissertation titled India in the time of Governor-General Warren Hastings in 1940.

During the Great Patriotic War, she was evacuated to Tashkent, where she took up Persian studies with the Institute of Oriental Studies of the Russian Academy of Sciences. She obtained her higher doctoral degree in 1950 for her work on the religious politics of the Mughal Emperor Akbar.

After the war, she joined the Russian Academy's Fundamental Library of Social Sciences, where she edited a bibliographic publication New foreign literature on Orientalism, a massive effort annotating nearly 7000 works every year. Antonova was lauded for her industry and rigour. She was one of six founding members of the Indian division (later, the Centre for Indian Studies) at the Institute of Oriental Studies.

At the end of the 1970s, Antonova was forced into retirement.

Koka Antonova died in Moscow in 2007.

=== Academics ===
In the 1940s and 1950s, Antonova with N.M. Goldberg began the first publication of archival works by Russian travellers to India.

In 1952, she published an article on feudalism in India, in which she claimed that from the fifth century onwards, free members of society were taxed, peasants enslaved, and land assigned to feudal lords, who were then able to dominate towns, ultimately delaying the development of capitalism in India. This was criticised for not addressing increased trade despite reduced per capita production of commodities, the latter being a major factor in the formation of state power. Further, her interpretation of source material from the Epigraphia Indica was questioned: she claimed that land grants were made to temples and the priesthood, with no mention that brahmins – unattached to any temple – were the primary recipients of grants, and that - unlike in European feudalism - there were no feudal dues from the recipient to the royal donor, nor any military service exacted.

Antonova began work on the Emperor Akbar because there were no strictures against such research from the Communist Party leadership. She believed she could write extensively on the Mughal king without fear of being accused of counter-revolutionary claims.

Antonova's book Essays on social relations and political system of Mughal India in the time of Akbar (1556–1605) was published in 1952, the first monograph on medieval India released in the Soviet Union. It was acclaimed for its use of original source material and innovative conclusions. A similar critical approval met her second book, The English conquest of India in the 18th century.

In 1973, she co-authored a bestselling History of India with Grigory Bongard-Levin and G.G. Kotovsky, which also became a standard text for students of Indology. Critics appreciated the wealth of historico-social data and considerations upon feudalism, the attention to the general culture in the various periods of the Indian middle ages, as well as the remarkable pages dealing with the economic development of India in the early 19th century.

== Selected works ==
- Очерки общественных отношений и политического строя Могольской Индии времен Акбара (1556–1605 гг.) [Essays on social relations and political system of Mughal India in the time of Akbar (1556–1605)]. 1952.
- Английское завоевание Иидии в XVIII в. [The English conquest of India in the 18th century]. 1958.
- Русско-индийские отношения в ХVII веке [Russo-Indian relations in the 17th century]. 1958.
- Русско-индийские отношения в XVIII в. [Russo-Indian relations in the 18th century]. 1965.
- История Индии в средние века [History of India in the Middle Ages]. 1968.
- История Индии: Кр. очерк [History of India: Short Essays]. Moscow: Мысль. 1973.

== Bibliography ==
- Alpatov, V. (2017). Языковеды, востоковеды, историки. Litres. ISBN 9785457896048.
- Bornet, P.; Gorshenina, S. (2014). "Zones marginales des études postcoloniales : nouvelles approches et comparaisons entre les mondes indien et russo-soviétique". Études de lettres (2–3): 17–78. doi:10.4000/edl.645.
- Glaesser, G. (1974). "Reviewed Work: Istorija Indii - Kratkij ocerk - History of India - Brief sketch by K.A. Antonova, G.M. Bongard-Levin, G.G. Kotovskij". East and West. 25 (3/4). JSTOR 29756120.
- Gordon, A.V. (2012). ""в России надо жить долго…": памяти К. А. Антоновой, (1910-2007) / сост. И отв. Ред. Л. Б. Алаев, Т. Н. Загородникова; Ин-т востоковедения РАН. - М. : Вост. Лит., 2010. - 470 с". Востоковедение и африканистика: Реферативный журнал. 9 (2).
- Kosambi, D.D (1955). "On the Development of Feudalism in India". Annals of the Bhandarkar Oriental Research Institute. 36 (3/4): 258–269. JSTOR 44082960.
- Ioffe, N. (1995). Back in Time: My Life, My Fate, My Epoch. Translated by F.S. Choate. Mehring Books. ISBN 9780929087702.
