= Anton (given name) =

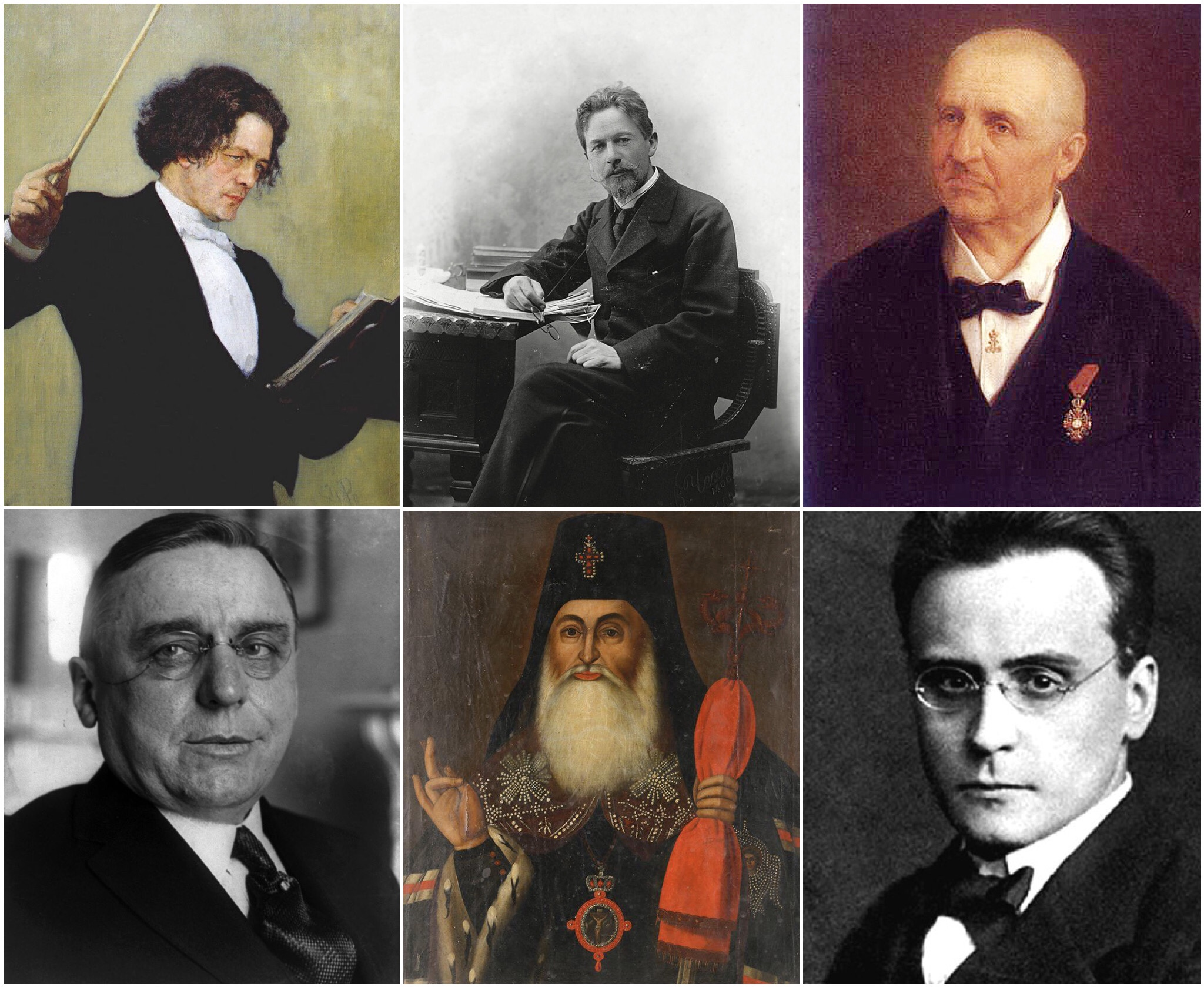
- Clockwise from top left: Rubinstein, Chekhov, Bruckner, Webern, Anton I, Cermak
- Gender: Male

Origin
- Language: Latin

Other names
- Alternative spelling: Антон (Cyrillic) ანტონ (Georgian)
- Related names: Antonius, Anthony

Anton is a masculine given name. It is derived from the Latin name Antonius, and used in various languages. Notable people and characters with the name include:

== People ==
=== Mononymous ===
- Anton of Schauenburg (died 1558), Archbishop-Elector of Cologne
- Anton I of Georgia, Catholicos–Patriarch of the Georgian Orthodox Church (1744–1755 and 1764–1788)
- Anton II of Georgia (1762 or 1763–1827), King of Kartli and Kakheti, and Catholicos Patriarch of Georgia, canonized by the Georgian church in 2011
- Anton I, Prince Esterházy (1738–1794), a prince of Hungary
- Anton of Stolberg-Wernigerode (1785–1854), chief minister in Magdeburg, governor of the Prussian Province of Saxony and Prussian Minister of State
- Prince Anton of Hohenzollern-Sigmaringen (1841–1866), German prince and soldier

=== A ===
- Anton Aaltonen (born 2003), Finnish footballer
- Anton Abele (born 1992), Swedish activist, debater and politician
- Anton Aberle (1876–1953), German-Swiss architect
- Anton Ackermann (1905–1973), German politician
- Anton Cajetan Adlgasser (1729–1777), German organist and composer
- Anton Adolf Kuyten (1937–2017), Dutch writer
- Anton Afritsch (1873–1924), Australian politician and journalist
- Anton Agius (1933–2008), Maltese sculptor
- Anton Ahlström (1869–1932), Finnish forest ranger and politician
- Antón de Alaminos (b. 1482), Spanish navigator and explorer
- Anton Alberts, multiple people
- Anton Alekseev, multiple people
- Anton Alén (born 1983), Finnish rally driver
- Anton Alexander, multiple people
- Anton Alikhanov (born 1986), Russian politician
- Anton Allemann (1936–2008), Swiss footballer
- Anton Altmann (1808–1871), Austrian painter
- Anton Ludvig Alvestad (1883–1956), Norwegian politician
- Anton Amelchenko (born 1985), Belarusian footballer
- Anton Wilhelm Amo (1703–1759), Ghanaian-German philosopher
- Anton Anchin (born 1990), Russian swimmer
- Anton Jörgen Andersen (1845–1926), Norwegian composer and cellist
- Anton Marius Andersen (1847–1941), American Lutheran minister
- Anton Andersen (1880–1971), Danish sports shooter
- Anton Anderson (1892–1960), American engineer and politician
- Anton Andersson (footballer) (born 1987), Swedish footballer
- Anton Andreasson (born 1993), Swedish footballer
- Anton Anno (1838–1893), German writer
- Anton Anreith (1754–1822), German sculptor
- Anton van Anrooy (1870–1949), British painter
- Anton Antipov (born 1990), Russian professional football player
- Anton Anton (born 1949), Romanian engineer and politician
- Anton Antonov (born 1998), Russian football player
- Anton Antonov-Ovseenko (1920–2013), Russian historian and writer
- Anton Apatin (born 1986), Russian football player
- Anton Apriantono (born 1959), Indonesian politician
- Anton Arensky (1861–1906), Russian composer, pianist and professor of music
- Anton von Aretin (1918–1981), German politician
- Anton I. Arion (1824–1897), Romanian politician
- Anton Eduard van Arkel (1893–1976), Dutch chemist
- Anton Armstrong (born 1956), musical artist
- Anton Aškerc (1856–1912), Slovenian poet and Roman Catholic priest
- Anton Astakhov (born 1987), Russian sports shooter
- Anton Avdeev (born 1986), Russian épée fencer
- Anton Axelsson (born 1986), Swedish ice hockey player
- Anton Ažbe (1862–1905), Slovenian painter

=== B ===
- Anton Babchuk (born 1984), Ukrainian-Russian ice hockey player
- Anton Babikov (born 1991), Russian biathlete
- Anton Bacalbașa (1865–1899), Romanian political journalist
- Anton Bagayev (born 1979), Russian footballer
- Anton Bahdanaw (born 2001), Belarusian footballer
- Anton Bakov (born 1965), Russian politician
- Anton de Balmen, Russian general of Scottish origin
- Anton Balthasar König (1753–1814), German historian and genealogist
- Anton Domenico Bamberini (1666–1741), Italian painter
- Anton Christian Bang (1840–1913), Norwegian bishop, writer and politician
- Anton Banko (1927–1986), Slovenian inventor and engineer
- Anton Baraniak (born 1951), Slovak weightlifter
- Anton Giuseppe Barbazza (1722–1780), Italian painter and engraver
- Anton Barbeau (born 1967), American singer songwriter
- Anton Bardok (born 1986), Belarusian footballer
- Anton Barnard (born 1958), South African rugby union footballer
- Anton Giulio Barrili (1836–1908), Italian patriot and writer
- Anton Barten (1930–2016), Belgian economist
- Anton Barticevic (1906–?), Chilean hammer thrower
- Heinrich Anton de Bary (1831–1888), German surgeon and biologist
- Anton Basansky (born 1987), Russian politician
- Anton Batagov (born 1965), Russian composer
- Anton Batugin (born 1980), Russian curler and coach
- Anton Baumstark (1800–1876), German classical philologist
- Anton Baydal (born 2000), Ukrainian footballer
- Anton du Beke (born 1966), English dancer
- Anton Belov (born 1986), Russian ice hockey Anton
- Anton Belov (footballer) (born 1996), Russian football player
- Anton Belov (musician) (born 1989), Russian musical artist
- Anton Belyaev (born 1979), Russian musician
- Anton Bengtsson (born 1993), Swedish professional ice hockey forward
- Anton Benya (1912–2001), Austrian politician
- Anton Berge (1892–1951), Norwegian agronomist and politician
- Anton Berger, Austrian para-alpine skier
- Anton Bergmann (1835–1874), Belgian Flemish activist and writer
- Anton Berindei (1838–1899), Romanian general and politician
- Anton Berisha (born 1946), Albanian folklorist
- Anton Bernard (born 1989), Italian professional ice hockey winger
- Anton Ulrik Berndes (1757–1844), Swedish artist and land surveyor
- Anton Berns, Dutch biochemist and cancer researcher
- Anton Besold (1904–1991), German politician
- Anton Bettelheim (1851–1930), Austrian critic and journalist
- Anton Betyuzhnov (born 1997), Russian football player
- Anton Betz (1893–1984), German journalist and publisher
- Anton Bidzilya (born 2000), Hungarian football player
- Anton Biegel, Austrian canoeist
- Anton Biersack (1907–1982), German composer and music educator
- Anton Biersack (ice hockey) (1927–2007), German ice hockey player
- Anton Bilek (1903–1991), Austrian footballer and manager
- Anton Biró (born 1939), Romanian ice hockey player
- Anton Björkman (born 1999), Swedish ice hockey player
- Anton Blackwood (born 1991), footballer
- Anton Blasbichler (born 1972), Italian luger
- Anton Blok (1935–2024), Dutch anthropologist
- Anton Blidh (born 1995), Swedish ice hockey forward
- Anton Blom (1924–2012), Norwegian journalist and author
- Anton Blomberg (born 1995), Swedish ice hockey player
- Anton Blomqvist (born 1990), Swedish ice hockey player
- Anton Bobyor (born 1982), Russian football midfielder
- Anton Bocharov (born 1995), Russian football player
- Anton Wilhelm Böhme (1673–1722), German Lutheran royal chaplain
- Anton Boisen (1876–1965), American chaplain
- Anton Bol (born 2003), Ukrainian footballer
- Anton Bolinder (1915–2006), Swedish high jumper
- Anton Borodachev (born 2000), Russian Olympic foil fencer
- Anton Botev (born 1986), Azerbaijani Greco-Roman wrestler
- Anton Boys, Dutch painter, draughtsman and printmaker
- Anton Brady (born 1994), Scottish footballer
- Anton Bragaglia (1890–1960), Italian photographer, filmmaker and writer
- Anton Braith (1836–1905), German painter
- Anton Bratkov (born 1993), Ukrainian footballer
- Anton Braun (born 1990), German rower
- Anton von Braunmühl (1853–1908), German mathematician
- Anton Bredell (born 1965), South African politician
- Anton Brehme (born 1999), German volleyball player
- Anton Brehmer (born 1994), Swedish ice hockey player
- Anton Breinl (1880–1944), Australian-Austrian tropical medicine physician
- Anton Bresler (born 1988), Namibian rugby union player
- Anton Giulio Brignole-Sale (1605–1662), Italian writer, poet and nobleman
- Anton Brioschi (1855–1920), Austrian painter, scenic designer and graphic artist
- Anton Wilhelm Brøgger (1884–1951), Norwegian archaeologist and politician
- Anton Brosenbauer (1909–1992), Austrian footballer
- Anton Bruckner (1824–1896), Austrian composer
- Anton Bruehl (1900–1982), Australian-born American photographer
- Anton Brugmans (1732–1789), Dutch physicist
- Anton Brusnikin (born 1986), Russian footballer
- Anton Frederik Bruun (1901–1961), Danish oceanographer and ichthyologist
- Anton Bubnow (born 1988), Belarusian professional footballer
- Anton Bühler (1922–2013), Swiss equestrian
- Anton Bukhanko (born 1986), Russian ice hockey player
- Anton Bulaev (born 1996), Russian archer
- Anton Bulla (1901–1987), Slovak footballer and coach
- Anton Burdasov (born 1991), Russian ice hockey player
- Anton Burg (1904–2003), American chemist
- Anton Burger (1911–1991), Austrian-German Nazi SS concentration camp commandant
- Anton Burger (artist) (1824–1905), German painter
- Anton Burghardt (1942–2022), German footballer and manager
- Anton Burko (born 1995), Belarusian footballer
- Anton Friedrich Büsching (1724–1793), German geographer, historian, educator and theologian
- Anton Buslov (1983–2014), Russian blogger and writer
- Anton But (born 1980), Ukrainian-Russian ice hockey player
- Anton Buteyko (1947–2019), Ukrainian diplomat
- Anton Bütler (1819–1874), Swiss painter
- Anton Julius Butter (1920–1989), Dutch economist
- Anton Buttigieg (1912–1983), Maltese politician and poet, president of Malta from 1976 until 1981
- Anton Byström (born 1992), Swedish ice hockey player

=== C ===
- Antón Cabaleiro (born 1977), Spanish visual artist
- Anton Cadar (1941–1989), Romanian gymnast
- Anton Cajtoft (born 1994), Swedish footballer
- Anton Calenic (born 1943), Romanian sprint canoeist
- Antón Cancelas (1955–2021), Spanish voice actor and broadcaster
- Anton Julius Carlson (1875–1956), Swedish-American physiologist
- Anton Cederholm (born 1995), Swedish ice hockey defenseman
- Anton Çelebi (1604–1674), Armenian merchant magnate, Ottoman and Tuscan official
- Anton Çetta (1920–1995), Kosovar academic
- Anton Cerer (1916–2006), Yugoslav swimmer
- Anton Cermak (1873–1933), American politician
- Anton Chaitkin, American writer, historian and LaRouchist activist
- Anton Abad Chavarria, Spanish singer-songwriter
- Anton Chekhov (1860–1904), Russian writer
- Anton Chermashentsev (born 1976), Russian rower
- Anton Cherniak (Shilo) (born 1970), Russian artist, frontman of Krovostok hip hop group
- Anton Chichkan (born 1995), Belarusian footballer
- Anton Chichulin (born 1984), Kazakh football midfielder
- Anton Chirlacopschi (born 1942), Romanian rower
- Anton Chladek (1794–1882), Romanian painter
- Anton Christoforidis (1917–1985), Greek boxer
- Anton Chupkov (born 1997), Russian swimmer
- Anton Chuvakin, computer security specialist
- Anton Collin (1891–1973), Finnish skier and cyclist
- Anton Constandse (1899–1985), Dutch author and journalist
- Anton Cooper (born 1994), New Zealand cyclist
- Anton Coppola (1917–2020), American opera conductor and composer
- Anton Corbijn (born 1955), Dutch photographer and video director
- Anton Coșa (born 1961), Romanian Catholic bishop
- Anton Cottier (1943–2006), Swiss politician
- Anton Crihan (1893–1993), Bessarabian politician
- Anton Crișan (1942–2012), Romanian ice hockey player

=== D ===
- Anton Dahl (1882–1952), Norwegian sports shooter
- Anton Dahlberg (born 1985), Swedish actor
- Anton Dahlström (born 1990), Swedish footballer
- Anton van Dale (1638–1708), Dutch minister
- Anton Datsko (born 1983), Ukrainian Paralympic fencer
- Anton Davidoglu (1876–1958), Romanian mathematician
- Anton Davydenko (born 1996), Ukrainian trampoline gymnast
- Anton Dedaj (born 1980), Croatian Kosovan football player
- Anton Maria Del Chiaro, Italian historian
- Anton Delvig (1798–1831), Russian poet and journalist
- Anton Demchenko (born 1987), Russian chess grandmaster
- Anton Demkov (born 1995), Belarusian professional footballer
- Anton Denikin (1872–1947), Russian military commander
- Anton Dermota (1910–1989), Slovenian tenor
- Anton Deusing (1612–1666), German physician
- Anton Devcich (born 1985), New Zealand cricketer
- Anton Diabelli (1781–1858), Austrian composer
- Anton Dieffenbach (1831–1914), German painter
- Anton Diel (1898–1959), German politician
- Anton Dietrich (1833–1904), German painter
- Anton Diffring (1916–1989), German actor
- Anton Dilger (1884–1918), German-American medical doctor
- Anton Dimitrov, multiple people
- Anton Djupvik (1881–1951), Norwegian politician
- Anton Döbele (1910–1943), German World War II fighter pilot
- Anton Doboș (born 1965), Romanian footballer
- Anton Docher (1852–1928), priest and missionary
- Anton Doda (1680–1766), Albanian vice consul
- Anton Dohrn (1840–1909), German Darwinist
- Anton Dolhyi (born 1992), Ukrainian football midfielder
- Anton Dolin, multiple people
- Anton Doll (1826–1887), German painter
- Anton Donchev (1930–2022), Bulgarian author
- Anton Donhauser (1913–1987), German politician
- Anton Donkor (born 1997), German footballer
- Anton Door (1833–1919), Austrian pianist and music educator
- Anton Dorph (1831–1914), Danish painter
- Anton Dostler (1891–1945), German general executed for war crimes
- Anton Down-Jenkins (born 1999), New Zealand diver
- Anton Josef Dräger (1794–1833), German painter
- Anton Dragúň (born 1942), Slovak footballer and manager
- Anton Drasche (1826–1904), Austrian interest and epidemiologist
- Anton Drexler (1884–1942), founder of the Nazi Party
- Anton Drobovych (born 1986), Ukrainian philosopher and academic
- Anton Du Beke (born 1966), English dancer and TV presenter
- Anton Dubinin (born 1985), Russian professional ice hockey player
- Anton Dubrov (born 1995), Belarusian tennis coach
- Anton Dudchenko (born 1996), Ukrainian biathlete
- Anton Dudik (born 2005), Ukrainian footballer
- Anton van Duinkerken (1903–1968), Dutch poet, essayist and academic
- Anton Dukach (born 1995), Ukrainian luger
- Anton Durcovici (1888–1951), Romanian Catholic bishop
- Anton Dworzak (born 2005), English association football player

=== E ===
- Anton Ebben (1930–2011), Dutch equestrian
- Anton Eberhard (1892–1967), German politician
- Anton Eberl (1765–1807), Austrian composer, teacher and pianist
- Anton Eberst (1920–2005), Serbian musical artist
- Anton Edthofer (1883–1971), Austrian actor
- Anton Eerola (born 1999), Finnish footballer
- Anton Efremov (born 2003), Russian footballer
- Anton Eger (born 1980), Norwegian-Swedish musical artist
- Anton Ehmann (born 1972), Austrian footballer
- Anton Eichholzer (1903–?), Austrian boxer
- Anton Eichleiter (1831–1902), German iron manufacturer
- Anton Einsle (1801–1871), Austrian portrait painter
- Anton Eiselsberg (1860–1939), Austrian neurosurgeon
- Anton Eisenhoit (1554–1603), German painter and engraver
- Anton Eisgruber (1912–1994), German Nordic combined skier
- Anton Elbel (1834–1912), Austrian engineer and locomotive designer
- Anton Elfinger (1821–1864), Austrian physician and educator
- Anton Eliassen (born 1945), Norwegian meteorologist
- Anton Elter (1858–1925), German classical philologist
- Anton Endstorfer (1880–1961), Austrian sculptor
- Anton Eriksson (born 2000), Swedish footballer
- Anton Erkoreka (born 1950), Basque historian of medicine and ethnographer
- Anton Ernst, South African-born film producer
- Antón Escobar (born 1998), Spanish footballer
- Anton Evtimov (born 1973), Bulgarian footballer
- Anton Ewald (born 1993), Swedish singer and dancer

=== F ===
- Anton Fahne (1805–1883), German author, jurist, genealogist and historian
- Anton Faistauer (1887–1930), Austrian artist
- Anton Falch (1860–1936), American baseball player
- Anton Fase (born 2000), Dutch footballer
- Anton Fedorin (1978–2012), Estonian judoka
- Anton Feichtner, German TV actor
- Anton Felkel, Austrian mathematician
- Anton Feoktistov (born 2001), Russian para-athlete
- Anton Ferdinand (born 1985), English footballer
- Anton Fernbach-Ferenczi (1925–1989), Romanian footballer
- Anton Ferreira (born 1955), South African cricketer
- Anton Fier (1956–2022), American rock drummer
- Anton Fig (born 1952), South African drummer
- Anton Filippov (born 1986), Uzbekistani chess grandmaster
- Anton Filkuka (1888–1957), Austrian painter
- Anton Fils (1733–1760), German composer
- Anton Fink (born 1987), German professional footballer
- Anton Fischer, multiple people
- Anton Flavel (born 1969), Australian Paralympic athlete
- Anton Flešár (1944–2024), Slovak footballer
- Anton Flettner (1885–1961), German aviation engineer and inventor
- Anton Florian, Prince of Liechtenstein (1656–1721), Duke of Prottau and Jägerndorf
- Anton Fokin (born 1982), Uzbek gymnast
- Anton Foliforov (born 1981), Russian mountain bike orienteer
- Anton Font (1932–2021), Spanish mime artist
- Anton Forrester (born 1994), English footballer
- Anton Forsberg (born 1992), Swedish ice hockey player
- Anton Forti (1790–1859), Austrian opera singer
- Anton Franki (1844–1908), Croatian Catholic priest and professor of church history and canon law
- Anton Franzen (1896–1968), German Nazi Party politician
- Anton Fridrichsen (1888–1953), Norwegian-born Swedish theologian
- Anton Friesen (born 1985), German politician
- Anton von Frisch (1849–1917), Austrian urologist
- Anton Frommelt (1895–1975), Deputy Prime Minister of Liechtenstein from 1933 to 1938
- Anton Frondell (born 2007), Swedish ice hockey player
- Anton Fugger (1493–1560), German merchant
- Anton Führer (1853–1930), German classicist
- Anton Furst (1944–1991), English production designer
- Anton Füster (1808–1881), Austrian Roman Catholic priest

=== G ===
- Anton Gaaei (born 2002), Danish footballer
- Anton Domenico Gabbiani (1652–1726), Italian painter
- Anton Gaddefors (born 1989), Swedish basketball player
- Anton Gafarov (born 1987), Russian cross-country skier
- Anton Gag (1859–1908), Bohemian-American painter
- Anton Jože Gale (1944–2018), Slovenian ice hockey player
- Anton Galkin (born 1979), Russian sprinter
- Anton Gămurari (1950–2021), Moldovan general
- Anton Edler von Gapp (1778–1862), Czech lawyer and university rector
- Antón García Abril (1933–2021), Spanish composer
- Anton Gargiulo, New Zealand badminton player
- Antón Garrote (born 1972), Spanish sailor
- Anton Gavel (born 1984), German basketball player
- Anton Geesink (1934–2010), Dutch judoka
- Anton Geiser (1924–2012), guard in a Nazi concentration camp
- Anton Geiss (1858–1944), German politician
- Anton Gelonkin (born 1964), Russian bank chairman
- Anton Genberg (1862–1939), Swedish painter
- Anton Slavchev Georgiev (born 1960), Bulgarian professor
- Anton Gerashchenko (born 1979), Ukrainian politician and economist
- Anton Getta (born 1980), Russian politician
- Anton Ghon (1866–1936), Austrian pathologist and bacteriologist
- Anton Gill, English author
- Anton Gill (basketball) (born 1994), American basketball player
- Anton Ginsburg (1930–2002), Russian pianist
- Anton Glanzelius (born 1974), Swedish actor
- Anton Glasnović (born 1981), Croatian sports shooter
- Anton Glazunov (born 1986), Russian basketball player
- Anton Glinkin (born 1988), Russian ice hockey player
- Anton Glovatsky (born 1988), Russian ice hockey player
- Anton Gnolistavisdze, Georgian politician and monk
- Anton Goering (1836–1905), German natural scientist, ornithologist, zoologist, painter and taxidermist
- Anton Gogiashvili (1878–1907), Georgian painter
- Anton Golopenția (1909–1951), Romanian sociologist
- Anton Golotsutskov (born 1985), Russian gymnast
- Anton Jude Gomes (1960–2012), Sri Lankan actor and comedian
- Anton Goosen (born 1946), South African musician and songwriter
- Anton Gorchev (1939–2000), Bulgarian actor
- Anton Gordonoff (1893–1966), Russian-Swiss pharmacologist and toxicologist
- Anton Gorelkin (born 1982), Russian politician
- Anton Gosswin (1546–1590), Flemish composer
- Anton Gottstein (1893–1982), Czech cross-country skier
- Anton Goubau (1616–1698), Flemish painter
- Anton Gourianov (born 1979), Russian sport shooter
- Anton P. de Graaff, Dutch writer
- Anton Graf von Arco auf Valley (1897–1945), Bavarian German far-right activist
- Anton Graff (1736–1813), Swiss portrait artist
- Anton Fritz Gragger, Austrian chess player
- Anton Grăjdieru, Moldovan journalist and politician
- Anton Grasser (1891–1976), German World War II army general
- Anton Grebnev (born 1984), Russian footballer
- Anton Greyling (born 1977), South African footballer
- Anton Grigoryev (born 1985), Russian footballer
- Anton Grimus (born 1990), Australian freestyle skier
- Anton Grot (1884–1974), Polish art director
- Anton Grundel (born 1990), Swedish ice hockey player
- Anton Grylewicz (1885–1971), German politician
- Anton Guadagno (1925–2002), Italian conductor
- Anton Gubankov (1965–2016), Russian TV journalist and civil servant
- Anton Gudukin (born 1982), Russian footballer
- Anton Guldener, Swiss bobsledder
- Anton Gunn (born 1973), American politician
- Anton Günther (1783–1863), Austrian philosopher
- Anton Gunzinger (born 1956), electronics engineer and entrepreneur
- Anton Gustafsson (born 1990), Swedish ice hockey player

=== H ===
- Anton Hackl (1915–1984), German Luftwaffe pilot
- Anton Hafner (1918–1944), German World War II flying ace
- Anton Hagman (born 1998), Swedish singer
- Anton Hahn (born 1984), German speed skater
- Anton Haig (born 1986), South African professional golfer
- Anton Haizinger (1796–1869), Austrian opera singer
- Anton Hajjar, American attorney
- Anton Halén (born 1990), Swedish handball player
- A. G. van Hamel (1886–1945), Dutch linguist
- Anton Hammerbacher (1871–1956), German politician
- Anton Hammerl (1969–2011), South African photojournalist
- Anton Hanak (1875–1934), Austrian sculptor
- Anton Handlirsch (1865–1935), Austrian entomologist
- Anton Hangel (1904–?), Austrian weightlifter
- Anton Hansch (1813–1876), Austrian painter
- Anton Hansen (1891–1960), Danish cartoonist and painter
- Anton Hansen (cyclist) (1886–1915), Norwegian cyclist
- Anton Hansen Tammsaare (A. H. Tammsaare; 1878–1940), Estonian writer
- Anton Hansgirg (1854–1917), Austrian phycologist
- Anton Harapi (1888–1946), Albanian politician, priest and writer
- Anton Harber (born 1958), South African professor of journalism
- Anton Theodor Harris (1804–1866), Norwegian politician
- Anton Harrison (born 2002), American football player
- Anton Hartinger (1806–1890), Austrian artist
- Anton Hartman (1918–1982), South African musical artist
- Anton Carl Hartmann (1803–1860), Norwegian politician
- Anton Haselmayer (1895–1962), German Nazi Party official
- Anton Haus (1851–1917), Austrian naval officer
- Anton Hay (born 1986), Ukrainian association football player
- Anton Hecht, English artist
- Anton Hedman (born 1986), Swedish ice hockey player
- Anton Hegarty (1892–1944), Irish cross-country runner
- Anton Hegner (1861–1915), Danish cellist and composer
- Anton Heida (1878–?), American artistic gymnast
- Anton Heiden (born 1960), Dutch water polo player
- Anton Heiller (1923–1979), Austrian musician
- Anton Heimerl (1857–1943), Austrian botanist
- Anton Hekking (1855–1935), Dutch cellist
- Anton thor Helle (1683–1748), Baltic German clergyman and translator
- Anton Henning (born 1964), German artist
- Anton C. Hesing (1823–1895), American journalist
- Anton Heyboer (1924–2005), Dutch painter
- Anton Hickel (1745–1798), Austrian artist
- Anton Hilbert (1898–1986), German politician
- Anton Hirschig (1867–1939), Dutch painter
- Anton Hodey (1908–?), German cyclist
- Anton Hodge (born 1969), British writer
- Anton Hofer (1927–2009), Austrian politician and trade unionist
- Anton Hofherr (1947–2024), German ice hockey player
- Anton Hofreiter (born 1970), German politician
- Anton von Hohberg und Buchwald (1885–1934), SS officer
- Anton Friedrich Hohl (1789–1862), German professor of obstetrics
- Anton Holban (1902–1937), Romanian novelist
- Anton Holenkov (born 1989), Ukrainian-Russian footballer
- Anton Holly (1875–1932), American politician
- Anton Hood (born 2000), New Zealand curler
- Anton van Hooff (born 1943), Dutch historian and author
- Anton Hooites-Meursing, Canadian gangster and criminal
- Anton Hoppe (1889–1968), German politician
- Anton Ludwig Ernst Horn (1774–1827), German physician
- Anton Horner (1877–1971), musical artist
- Anton Hrušecký (1942–2019), Slovak footballer
- Anton Huber, German sailor
- Anton Huck (1881–1951), Canadian politician
- Anton Huiskes (1928–2008), Dutch speed skater
- Anton Huotari (1881–1931), Finnish politician and journalist
- Anton Hur (born 1981), Korean writer and translator
- Anton Husgafvel (1900–1980), Finnish sprinter
- Anton Hykisch (1932–2024), Slovak writer and politician
- Anton Hysén (born 1990), Swedish football player

=== I ===
- Anton Iaria (born 1996), Italy international rugby league footballer
- Anton Idzkovsky (1907–1995), Ukrainian footballer, manager and administrator
- Anton Carl Illum (1863–1938), Danish industrialist
- Anton Ingolič (1907–1992), Slovene writer, playwright and editor
- Anton Ionescu (1939–2023), Romanian politician
- Anton Ipsen (born 1994), Danish swimmer
- Anton Irv (1886–1919), Estonian military commander
- Anton Ivakin (born 1991), Russian athlete and pole vaulter
- Anton Ivanescu, Romanian canoeist
- Anton Ivanov, multiple people
- Anton Ivashkin (born 1996), Belarusian cyclist

=== J ===
- Anton Jacobs-Webb (born 2000), Canadian ice sledge hockey player
- Anton Jaich, Czech painter
- Anton Jamnik (born 1961), Slovenian Roman Catholic prelate
- Anton Janda (1904–1985), Austrian footballer
- Anton Jánoš (born 1958), Slovak footballer and manager
- Anton Janša (1734–1773), Slovenian beekeeper and painter
- Anton Janson (1620–1687), Dutch typographer
- Anton Janssen (born 1963), Dutch footballer and manager
- Anton David Jeftha, South African actor, MC and model
- Anton Marius Jenssen (1879–1967), Norwegian politician and merchant
- Anton Jerger, Austrian philatelist
- Anton Jeyanathan (1948–2016), Sri Lankan politician
- Antón Jiménez (born 1975), musical artist
- Anton Jivaev, Russian violist
- Anton Joachimsthaler (born 1930), German historian
- Anton Johannsen (1872–?), German-American architect
- Anton Johanson (1877–1952), Swedish footballer
- Anton Johansson (ice hockey) (born 2004), Swedish ice hockey player
- Anton Johnson Brandt (1893–1951), Norwegian veterinarian
- Anton J. Johnson (1878–1958), American politician
- Anton Joksch (1900–1962), German cyclist
- Anton Jones (1937–2016), Sri Lankan singer
- Anton Jongsma (born 1983), Curaçaoan footballer
- Anton Jonsson (born 1977), Swedish Magic: The Gathering Player
- Anton Josipović (born 1961), Bosnian Croat boxer who competed for Yugoslavia
- Anton Jude (1960–2012), Sri Lankan actor, comedian and singer

=== K ===
- Anton Kade (born 2004), German footballer
- Anton Kaindl (1902–1948), German SS concentration camp commandant
- Anton Kaisti (born 1992), Finnish badminton player
- Anton Kalalb (born 1988), Russian curler
- Anton Kalaytan (born 1998), Ukrainian footballer
- Anton Kalinitschenko (born 1982), Russian ski jumper
- Anton Källberg (born 1997), Swedish table tennis player
- Anton Kaltenberger (1904–1979), Austrian bobsledder
- Anton Kalvaa (1857–1922), Norwegian trade unionist and politician
- Anton Kamenev (born 1986), Russian Nordic combined skier
- Anton Kandinov (1857–1926), Azerbaijani architect
- Anton Kanibolotskyi (born 1988), Ukrainian footballer
- Anton Kannemeyer (born 1967), South African comics artist
- Anton Kapotov (born 1991), Russian ice hockey player
- Anton Kapustin (born 1971), Russian-American physicist
- Anton Karachanakov (born 1992), Bulgarian footballer
- Anton Karas (1906–1985), Austrian zither player
- Anton Karlsson, multiple people
- Anton Karoukin, Belarusian archer
- Anton Kartashev (1875–1960), Russian church historian
- Anton Kasipović (born 1956), Bosnian Croat politician, lawyer and journalist
- Anton Kathrein Jr., German billionaire businessman
- Anton Kaulbach (1864–1934), German painter
- Anton Kavalewski (born 1968), Belarusian footballer
- Anton Kavalyow (born 2000), Belarusian footballer
- Anton Kazakov (born 2004), Ukrainian snooker player
- Anton Kazantsev (born 1986), Kazakhstani ice hockey player
- Anton Kazarnovski (born 1985), Israeli-Russian basketball player
- Anton Kehle (1947–1997), German ice hockey player
- Anton Kehrli (born 1957), Swiss wheelchair curler and Paralympian
- Anton Kern (1709–1747), German painter
- Anton Kerner von Marilaun (1831–1898), Austrian botanist and professor
- Anton Khazov (born 1979), Russian footballer
- Anton Khodyrev (born 1992), Russian footballer
- Anton Kholyaznykov (born 1986), Ukrainian rower
- Anton Khromykh (born 1982), Ukrainian footballer
- Anton Khudobin (born 1986), Kazakhstani-Russian professional ice hockey goaltender
- Anton Kicha (born 1990), Ukrainian footballer
- Anton Eduard Kieldrup (1826–1869), Danish landscape painter
- Anton Kilin (born 1990), Russian footballer
- Anton Kinnander (born 1996), Swedish footballer
- Anton Kinzel (1922–?), Austrian chess player
- Anton Josef Kirchweger (died 1746), German alchemist
- Anton Kireyev (born 1983), Russian footballer
- Anton Kirov (born 1990), Bulgarian footballer
- Anton Kiselyov (born 1986), Russian footballer
- Anton Kisse (born 1958), Ukrainian politician and Bulgarian community leader
- Anton Klaus (1829–1897), American businessman and 12th mayor of Green Bay, Wisconsin
- Anton Fredrik Klaveness, multiple people
- Anton Klaveness (1874–1958), Norwegian ship-owner
- Anton Klementyev (born 1990), Russian ice hockey player
- Anton Kliegl (1872–1927), German-American businessman
- Anton Klimenko (born 1985), Russian footballer
- Anton Klodič Sabladoski (1836–1914), Slovenian philologist, poet and pedagogue
- Anton Klykov (born 1993), Russian figure skater
- Anton Knoll (born 2004), Austrian diver
- Anton Koberger (c. 1440/1445–1513), German goldsmith, printer and publisher
- Anton Maria Kobolt (1752–1826), German Catholic priest and historian
- Anton Kobyalko (born 1986), Russian footballer
- Anton Koch, multiple people
- Anton Kochenkov (born 1987), Kyrgyzstani footballer
- Anton Kochinyan (1913–1990), Soviet politician
- Anton Kogler (born 1939), Austrian cross-country skier
- Anton Kohler (1907–1961), German chess player
- Anton Kokorin (born 1987), Russian sprinter
- Anton Kol (born 1990), Ukrainian Paralympic swimmer
- Anton Kolig (1886–1950), Austrian painter
- Anton Köllisch (1888–1916), German chemist
- Anton Kolm (1865–1922), Austrian film director
- Anton Koltsov (born 1973), Russian politician
- Anton Komolov (born 1976), Russian radio and TV presenter
- Anton Konovalov (born 1985), Russian alpine skier
- Anton Kontra (1932–2020), Hungarian-Danish violinist
- Anton Koolmann (1899–1953), Estonian wrestler
- Anton Koprivitsa (born 1991), Russian snowboarder
- Anton Körberg (born 1977), Swedish TV presenter, musician and actor
- Anton Korchuk (born 2004), Ukrainian ski jumper
- Anton Korn (1886–1942), American architect
- Anton Korobov (born 1985), Ukrainian chess grandmaster
- Anton Korolyov (born 1988), Russian ice hockey player
- Anton Korošec (1872–1940), Slovenian politician
- Anton Korynevych (born 1986), Ukrainian politician
- Anton Kosmač (born 1976), Slovenian long-distance runner
- Anton Kostadinov (born 1982), Bulgarian footballer
- Anton Köszegi (born 1970), Austrian footballer
- Anton Kotkov (born 1990), Russian taekwondo practitioner
- Anton Kotlyar (born 1993), Ukrainian footballer
- Anton Kotonen (1876–1936), Finnish jurist and politician
- Anton Kotyakov (born 1980), Russian politician
- Anton Kotzig (1919–1991), Slovak-Canadian mathematician
- Anton Kovalevski (born 1985), Ukrainian figure skater
- Anton Kovalyov (born 1992), Ukrainian-Canadian chess grandmaster
- Anton Kozlov (born 1988), Russian footballer
- Anton Kozorez (born 1983), Russian footballer
- Anton Kraabel (1862–1934), American politician
- Anton Kralj (born 1998), Swedish footballer
- Anton Kramar (born 1988), Ukrainian footballer
- Anton Kramarenko (born 1984), Kyrgyzstani footballer
- Anton Krammer (1929–1986), Austrian footballer
- Anton Krásnohorský (1925–1988), Slovak footballer
- Anton Krasnoshtanov (born 1986), Russian politician
- Anton Krasovsky (born 1975), Russian TV personality
- Anton Krautheimer (1879–1956), German sculptor
- Anton Kravchenko (born 1991), Ukrainian footballer
- Anton Krenn (1911–1993), Austrian footballer
- Anton Kreß (1899–1957), German footballer
- Anton Krešić (born 1996), German-born Croatian association football player
- Anton Kriel (born 1964), South African badminton player
- Anton Krijgsman (1898–1974), Dutch cyclist
- Anton Krivobokov (born 1993), Russian judoka
- Anton Krošl (1905–1945), Slovenian writer
- Anton Krotov (born 1998), Russian footballer
- Anton Krupicka (born 1983), American ultra-runner
- Anton Krysanov (born 1987), Russian ice hockey player
- Anton Kryvotsyuk (born 1998), Azerbaijani footballer
- Anton Kržan (1835–1888), Croatian academic
- Anton Krzyzanowski (born 1995), Russian intersex activist
- Anton Kubala (born 1981), Slovak footballer
- Anton Kučmín (born 1984), Slovak race walker
- Anton Kuerti (born 1938), Canadian pianist, composer and conductor
- Anton Kugler (1898–1962), German footballer
- Anton Kuh (1891–1941), Austrian-Jewish journalist and essayist
- Anton Kui, Papua New Guinean international rugby league footballer
- Anton Kuivanen (born 1984), Finnish mixed martial arts fighter
- Anton Kukhta (born 1991), Ukrainian footballer
- Anton Kuksin (born 1995), Kazakhstani association football player
- Anton Kuliatin (born 1991), Russian Paralympic athlete
- Anton Kunz (1915–2010), Austrian water polo player
- Anton Kupchin (born 1990), Russian footballer
- Anton Kurochkin (born 2003), Swedish footballer
- Anton Kuryanov (born 1983), Russian ice hockey player
- Anton Kushnir (born 1984), Belarusian freestyle skier
- Anton Kushniruk (born 1995), Russian footballer
- Anton Kuster (born 1923), Swiss canoeist
- Anton Kuys (1903–1978), Dutch cyclist
- Anton Kuzmanov (1918–2005), Bulgarian footballer
- Anton Kuzmin (born 1996), Kazakh bicycle racer
- Anton Kuznetsov (born 1989), Kazakhstani volleyball player
- Anton Kuzov (born 1929), Bulgarian basketball player
- Anton Kwiatkowski, musical artist

=== L ===
- Anton Wilhelm von L'Estocq (1738–1815), Prussian cavalry general
- Anton La Vin, Australian rugby union player
- Anton Laar (1885–1933), Estonian politician
- Anton Labutin (born 1987), Russian footballer
- Anton Lada (1890–1944), American ragtime and jazz drummer
- Anton Lahdenperä (born 1985), Swedish alpine skier
- Anton Lajovic (1878–1960), Slovenian composer
- Antón Lamazares (born 1954), Spanish painter
- Anton Lander (born 1991), Swedish ice hockey player
- Anton Lang (1875–1938), German studio potter and actor
- Anton Lans (born 1991), Swedish footballer
- Anton Lapenko (born 1986), Russian actor
- Anton Larson (1873–1965), American politician
- Anton LaVey (1930–1997), founder of the Church of Satan
- Anton Lazarev (born 1990), Russian ice hockey player
- Anton Lazko (born 1971), Russian canoeist
- Anton Lazutkin (born 1994), Russian footballer
- Anton Leader (1913–1988), American film director
- Anton Lechner (1907–1975), SS officer
- Anton Ledermaier, Austrian para-alpine skier
- Anton van Leeuwenhoek (1632–1723), Dutch microbiologist
- Anton Legashov (1798–1865), Russian painter
- Anton Robert Leinweber (1845–1921), German painter
- Anton G. Leitner (born 1961), German writer and publisher
- Anton Lembede (1914–1947), founding president of the African National Congress Youth League
- Anton Lengauer-Stockner (born 1961), Austrian biathlete
- Anton Lens (1884–1955), Dutch footballer
- Anton Leonard (born 1974), South African international rugby union player
- Anton Lepola (born 1996), Finnish footballer
- Anton Lesser (born 1952), English actor
- Anton Levtchi (born 1995), Finnish ice hockey player
- Anton Levy (born 1974), American businessman
- Anton Lichkov (born 1980), Bulgarian footballer
- Anton Lienert-Brown (born 1995), New Zealand rugby union player
- Anton Werner Lignell (1867–1954), Finnish-American architect
- Anton Liljenbäck (born 1995), Swedish footballer
- Anton Lindfors (born 1991), Finnish snowboarder
- Anton Lindholm (born 1994), Swedish ice hockey player
- Anton Lindner (1917–1994), German World War II fighter pilot
- Anton Lindskog (born 1993), Swedish handball player
- Anton Tomaž Linhart (1756–1795), Slovenian playwright and historian
- Anton Lipošćak (1863–1924), Austro-Hungarian general of Croatian descent
- Anton Loginov (1882–1963), Russian revolutionary and Soviet writer and journalist
- Anton Løkkeberg (1927–1985), Norwegian footballer
- Anton Lončar (born 1996), Croatian swimmer
- Anton Lopatin (1897–1965), Soviet lieutenant general
- Anton Losenko (1737–1773), Russian painter
- Anton Lubowski (1952–1989), Namibian politician
- Anton Francesco Lucini (1610–1661), Italian engraver and printmaker
- Anton Luckievich (1884–1942), Belarusian politician
- Anton Logi Lúðvíksson (born 2003), Icelandic footballer
- Anton Lui (born 1985), Papua New Guinean sprinter
- Anton Lukashin (born 1995), Belarusian footballer
- Anton Lundell (born 2001), Finnish ice hockey player
- Anton Lundqvist (born 1989), Swedish actor
- Anton Lunin (born 1986), Russian footballer
- Anton Lutsyk (born 1987), Ukrainian footballer
- Anton Lystopad (1991–2022), Ukrainian military pilot
- Anton Lysyuk (born 1987), Ukrainian footballer
- Anton Lyuboslavskiy (born 1984), Russian shot putter

=== M ===
- A. F. Maciejewski (1893–1949), American politician
- Anton Mackowiak (1922–2013), German wrestler
- Anton Mader (1913–1984), German World War II flying ace
- Anton Maegerle, German journalist
- Anton Maglica (born 1991), Bosnian-born Croatian football striker
- Anton Mahnič (1850–1920), Croatian-Slovenian prelate and philosopher
- Anton Mailyan (1880–1942), Armenian composer
- Anton Giulio Majano (1909–1994), Italian screenwriter
- Anton Makarenko (1888–1939), Soviet educator, social worker and writer
- Anton Makarenko (footballer) (born 1988), Ukrainian footballer
- Anton Makurin (born 1994), Russian footballer
- Anton Malatinský (1920–1992), Slovak footballer and coach
- Anton Malloth (1912–2002), Dutch-German war criminal
- Anton Malyshev (born 1985), Russian ice hockey player
- Anton Mamaev (born 1997), Russian snowboarder
- Anton Mamonov (born 1989), Russian footballer
- Anton Manegin (born 1990), Russian tennis player
- Anton Mang (born 1949), German motorcycle racer
- Anton Mangman (1900–1937), Estonian politician
- Anton Manolov (born 1937), Bulgarian sports shooter
- Anton Maria Maragliano (1664–1739), Italian sculptor
- Anton Marchl (born 1965), Austrian wrestler
- Anton Marcinčin (born 1968), Slovak politician and economist
- Anton Marek (1913–1963), Austrian footballer and manager
- Anton Maresch (born 1991), Austrian basketball player
- Anton Marik (1940–2025), Austrian conductor
- Anton Marklund (born 1992), Swedish race car driver
- Anton von Maron (1733–1808), Austrian painter
- Anton Rolandsson Martin (1729–1785), Swedish botanist
- Anton Martinson (1883–1919), Estonian politician
- Anton Marty (1847–1914), Swiss philosopher and priest
- Anton Matinlauri (born 1989), Finnish football coach
- Anton Matković (born 2006), Croatian footballer
- Anton Mattle (born 1963), Austrian politician
- Anton Matusevich (born 2001), British tennis player
- Anton Matveyenko, multiple people
- Anton Mauve (1838–1888), Dutch painter
- Anton Mavretič (1934–2019), Slovenian electrical engineer
- Anton McKee (born 1993), Icelandic swimmer
- Anton McKenzie (born 1981), American gridiron football player
- Anton Medan (1957–2021), Indonesian criminal
- Anton Megerdichev (born 1969), Russian director and screenwriter
- Anton Melbye (1818–1875), Danish artist
- Anton Melnik (born 1984), Russian film producer
- Anton Memminger (1846–1923), German author, publisher and politician
- Anton Menge (1808–1880), German ecologist
- Anton Raphael Mengs (1728–1779), German painter
- Anton Meybusch (1645–1702), German medallist
- Anton Milenin (born 1969), Russian actor
- Anton Miller (born 1963), American violinist and violin pedagogue
- Anton Minárik (born 1977), Slovak judoka
- Anton Miranchuk (born 1995), Russian footballer
- Anton Mirou (1578–1621), Flemish painter
- Anton Mišovec (born 1966), Czech footballer and manager
- Anton Miterev (born 1996), Russian footballer
- Anton Mitryushkin (born 1996), Russian footballer
- Anton Mitterwurzer (1818–1876), German opera singer
- Anton Moeliono (1929–2011), Indonesian linguist and grammarian
- Anton Mohr (1890–1968), Norwegian geographer and historian
- Anton Moisescu (1913–1997), Romanian politician
- Anton Möller (1563–1611), German painter
- Anton Monakhov (born 1982), Ukrainian-born Russian footballer
- Anton Moravčík (1931–1996), Slovak footballer
- Anton Mordasov (born 1972), Russian pianist
- Anton O. Morken (1885–1959), Canadian politician
- Anton Morosani (1907–1993), Swiss ice hockey player
- Anton Morozov (born 1972), Russian politician
- Anton Mosimann (born 1947), Swiss chef and restaurateur
- Anton N. Moursund (1877–1965), American politician
- Anton Mukhin (born 2005), Russian footballer
- Anton Mukhovykov (born 1984), Ukrainian footballer
- Anton Müller (born 1983), German footballer
- Anton Müller (sport shooter) (born 1947), Swiss sports shooter
- Anton Munteanu (1932–2007), Romanian footballer
- Anton Munukka (born 2004), Finnish footballer
- Anton Murray (1922–1995), South African cricketer
- Anton Muscatelli (born 1962), Scottish economist
- Anton Musiyenko (born 1997), Ukrainian basketball player
- Anton Mussert (1894–1946), Dutch Nazi sympathizer
- Anton Muttukumaru (1908–2001), first indigenous Commander of the Sri Lanka Army
- Anton Muzychkin (born 1994), Belarusian bicycle racer
- Anton Myhda (born 1995), Ukrainian biathlete
- Anton Myrer (1922–1996), American novelist

=== N ===
- Anton Nazarenko (born 1984), Russian badminton player
- Anton Nebylitskiy (born 1989), Russian racing driver
- Anton Nedyalkov (born 1993), Bulgarian footballer
- Anton Neininger (born 1950), Swiss ice hockey player
- Anton Nemkin (born 1983), Russian politician
- Anton Newcombe (born 1967), American musician
- Anton Willem Nieuwenhuis (1864–1953), Dutch explorer and physician
- Anton Nilson (1887–1989), Swedish Communist militant
- Anton Nimenko (born 1980), Russian figure skater and coach
- Anton Nistl, American soccer player
- Anton Norris (born 1940), Barbadian high jumper
- Anton Nossik (1966–2017), Russian journalist, social activist and blogger
- Anton Novačan (1887–1951), Slovene politician, diplomat, author and playwright
- Anton Novik (born 1998), Belarusian footballer
- Anton Nowak (1865–1932), Austrian artist and graphic designer
- Anton Nowakowski (1897–1969), German organist, conductor and composer
- Anton Nuhn (1814–1889), German anatomist

=== O ===
- Anton Oberbeck (1846–1900), German physicist
- Anton Obernosterer, Austrian rower
- Anton Obholzer (born 1968), British rower
- Anton Odabasi (born 1995), Finnish-Turkish basketball player
- Anton Ognyanov (born 1988), Bulgarian footballer
- Anton Öhman (born 1995), Swedish ice hockey player
- Apolo Anton Ohno (born 1982), American speed skater
- Anton Ernst Oldofredi (1906–1982), German scholar and physician
- Anton Oliver (born 1975), New Zealand rugby player
- Anton Olsen, multiple people
- Anton Olsson, multiple people
- Anton Ondruš (born 1950), Slovak footballer
- Anton Orlov (born 1997), Russian footballer
- Anton Otulakowski (born 1956), English footballer
- Anton Õunapuu (1887–1919), Estonian scouting activist

=== P ===
- Anton Pain Ratu (1929–2024), Indonesian Roman Catholic bishop
- Anton Palepoi (born 1978), American Samoan gridiron football player
- Anton Palvadre (1886–1942), Estonian lawyer and politician
- Anton Palzer (born 1993), German cyclist
- Anton Pann (1790s–1854), Ottoman-born Wallachian composer
- Anton Pannekoek (1873–1960), Dutch astronomer and Marxist theorist
- Anton Panov (1906–1967), Macedonian writer
- Anton Pantov (born 1991), Kazakhstani biathlete
- Anton Parsons (born 1968), New Zealand sculptor
- Anton Paskalev (born 1958), Bulgarian pole vaulter
- Anton de Pasquale (born 1995), Australian motor racing driver
- Anton Paulsen (1690–1748), Swedish baroque portrait painter
- Anton Pauschenwein (born 1981), Austrian footballer
- Antón Paz (born 1976), Spanish sailor
- Anton Charles Pegis (1905–1978), American philosopher and theologian
- Anton Peikrishvili (born 1987), Georgian rugby union player
- Anton Pelinka (1941–2025), Austrian political scientist
- Anton F. L. Pelt (1799–1861), German Protestant theologian
- Anton Perich, Croatian-American filmmaker, photographer and video artist
- Anton Persson (ice hockey) (born 1989), Swedish ice hockey player
- Anton Persson (skier) (born 1995), Swedish cross-country skier
- Anton Perwein (1911–1981), Austrian handball player
- Anton Peschka (1885–1940), Austrian painter
- Anton Peterlin, multiple people
- Anton Peters (1923–1989), Belgian actor and director
- Anton Petrea (born 1975), Romanian association football manager and former player
- Anton Petrov, multiple people
- Anton Lundin Pettersson (1994–2015), Swedish murderer, perpetrator of the Trollhättan school stabbing
- Anton Philips (1874–1951), Dutch industrialist
- Anton Phillips (born 1943), Jamaican-born British actor
- Anton Pichler (1697–1779), German-Italian gemcutter
- Anton Pichler (footballer) (born 1955), Austrian footballer
- Anton Piëch (1894–1952), Austrian lawyer and car company manager
- Anton Pieck (1895–1987), Dutch artist
- Anton Pierre (born 1977), Trinidad and Tobago footballer
- Anton Ranjith Pillainayagam (born 1966), Sri Lankan Tamil Catholic priest, Auxiliary Bishop of the Archdiocese of Colombo
- Anton Maria Pirovano, Italian sculptor
- Anton Piskunov (born 1989), Russian footballer
- Anton Pitout (born 1976), South African rugby union player
- Anton Wilhelm Plaz (1708–1784), German physician and botanist
- Anton Plenikowski (1899–1971), German politician
- Anton Pliesnoi (born 1996), Georgian weightlifter
- Anton Podbevšek (1898–1981), Slovenian poet
- Anton Pogue (born 1968), American snowboarder
- Anton Pointner (1894–1949), Austrian actor
- Anton Poleschuk (born 1987), Russian ice hockey player
- Anton Polyakov (1987–2021), Ukrainian politician
- Anton Igorevich Polyakov (born 1984), Russian endocrinologist and nutritionist
- Anton Polyutkin (born 1993), Russian footballer
- Anton Pongratz (1948–2008), Romanian fencer
- Anton Ponkrashov (born 1986), Russian basketball player
- Anton Ponomarev (born 1988), Kazakhstani basketball player
- Anton Popovitch (born 1996), Finnish footballer
- Anton Posset (1941–2015), German holocaust historian and teacher
- Anton Postupalenko (born 1988), Ukrainian footballer
- Anton Powers (born 1989), English DJ and record producer
- Anton Powolny (1899–1961), Austrian footballer
- Anton Praeg, South African wrestler
- Anton Praetorius (1560–1613), German pastor
- Anton Prakapenia (born 1988), Belarusian handball player
- Anton Probst, German Paralympic volleyball player
- Anton von Prokesch-Osten (1795–1876), Austrian-Hungarian diplomat, statesman and general
- Anton Prokhorov (born 1992), Russian Paralympic athlete
- Anton Pronk (1941–2016), Dutch footballer
- Anton Prykhodko (1891–1938), Ukrainian Soviet statesman
- Anton Prylepau (born 1984), Belarusian archer
- Anton Ptushkin (born 1984), Ukrainian TV presenter, YouTuber, traveler and journalist
- Anton Pushkov (born 1988), Russian basketball player
- Anton Putsila (born 1987), Belarusian footballer
- Antón Quindimil (born 1999), Spanish footballer
- Anton Quintana (1937–2017), Dutch writer
- Anton Quni (born 1967), Kosovar politician and military commander

=== R ===
- Anton Raadik (1917–1999), Estonian boxer
- Anton Raaff (1714–1797), German tenor
- Anton Rabie, Canadian billionaire businessman
- Anton Rabtsaw (born 1984), Belarusian footballer
- Anton Ræder (1855–1941), Norwegian educator, philologist and historian
- Anton Räderscheidt (1892–1970), German artist
- Anton Ratasepp, Estonian politician
- Anton A. Raven (1833–1919), Curaçaoan-born American business executive
- Anton Philipp Reclam (1807–1896), German publisher
- Anton Refalo (born 1956), Maltese politician
- Anton Refregier (1905–1979), Russian-American painter
- Anton Regh (1940–2018), German footballer
- Anton Rehmann (1840–1917), Austrian botanist
- Anton Reicha (1770–1836), Czech-born French composer
- Anton Reichenow (1847–1941), German ornithologist and herpetologist
- Anton Reinartz (1926–2002), German rower
- Anton Reinlein (1766–?), Austrian clockmaker
- Anton Reinthaller (1895–1958), Austrian right-wing politician
- Anton Reisenegger (born 1969), Chilean guitarist and vocalist
- Anton Josef Reiss (1835–1900), German sculptor
- Anton Rekhtin (born 1989), Russian ice hockey player
- Anton Resch (1921–1975), German World War II fighter pilot
- Anton Reznicek, North American botanist
- Anton Richter (1911–1989), Austrian weightlifter
- Anton Pius Riegel (1789–1868), Austrian architect
- Anton Riepl (born 1969), German high jumper
- Anton Rintelen (1876–1946), Austrian academic, jurist and politician
- Anton Rippon (born 1944), English writer
- Anton Rittel, Swiss footballer
- Anton Rizov (born 1987), Bulgarian sports shooter
- Anton Robinson (born 1986), English footballer
- Anton Rodgers (1933–2007), English actor
- Anton Rodgers (footballer) (born 1993), Irish professional footballer
- Anton Rödin (born 1990), Swedish ice hockey player
- Anton Rogan (born 1966), Northern Irish footballer
- Anton Rogochiy (born 1982), Russian footballer and coach
- Anton Rohner (1871–1951), Swiss clergyman and professor
- Anton Rom (1909–1994), German rower
- Anton Romako (1832–1889), Austrian painter
- Anton Johan Rønneberg (1856–1922), Norwegian politician
- Anton Rop (born 1960), Slovenian politician
- Anton del Rosario (born 1981), Filipino footballer
- Anton Rosén (born 1991), Swedish motorcycle speedway rider
- Anton Rosen (1859–1928), Danish architect and professor
- Anton Roux (born 1981), South African cricketer
- Anton Rovner (born 1970), Russian-American composer
- Anton Rubinstein (1829–1894), Russian pianist, composer and conductor
- Anton Rücker (born 2001), German footballer
- Anton Rudakov (born 1989), Russian footballer
- Anton Rudinski (1937–2017), Serbian footballer
- Anton Rudoy (born 1983), Kazakhstani rugby player
- Anton Rukavina (born 1985), Croatian footballer
- Anton Rumpelmayer (1832–1914), Austrian confectioner
- Anton Rupert (1916–2006), South African businessman
- Anton Ryakhov (born 1980), Russian canoeist
- Anton Ryen (1894–1968), Norwegian politician

=== S ===
- Anton Sabel (1902–1983), German politician
- Anton Saefkow (1903–1944), German resistance fighter and communist
- Anton Sagadeyev (born 1993), Kazakh ice hockey player
- Anton Sakharov (born 1982), Russian footballer
- Anton Salabay (born 2002), Ukrainian footballer
- Anton Šalát (1892–1944), Slovak politician
- Anton Salétros (born 1996), Swedish footballer
- Anton Salman (born 1957), Palestinian lawyer and politician
- Anton Yegorovich von Saltza (1843–1916), Russian general
- Anton Salvesen (1927–1994), Norwegian luger
- Anton Maria Salvini (1653–1729), Italian naturalist and classicist
- Anton Samba (born 1982), Indonesian footballer
- Anton Samoylov (born 1983), Russian footballer
- Anton Sandström (born 1981), Swedish male curler
- Anton Sanko (born 1960), American film score composer
- Anton Santesson (born 1994), Swedish ice hockey defenseman
- Anton Saroka (born 1992), Belarusian footballer
- Anton Saurma von der Jeltsch (1836–1900), German aristocrat and diplomat
- Anton Eleutherius Sauter (1800–1881), Austrian botanist and physician
- Anton Savage, Irish radio and TV presenter
- Anton Savin (born 1990), Ukrainian footballer
- Anton Schaaf (1962–2020), German politician
- Anton Schaars (1887–1963), Dutch Roman Catholic priest
- Anton Schall (1907–1947), Austrian footballer
- Anton Ferdinand Schaller (1772–1844), Austrian painter
- Anton Schär (born 1942), Swiss boxer
- Anton Schärer, Swiss weightlifter
- Anton Scharinger (born 1959), Austrian operatic bass-baritone
- Anton G. Schauer (1860–1932), American politician
- Anton Schifferer (1871–1943), German business executive and politician
- Anton van Schijndel (born 1960), Dutch politician
- Anton Schindler (1795–1864), associate, secretary and early biographer of Ludwig van Beethoven
- Anton Schindling (1947–2020), German historian of modern age
- Anton Schlecker (born 1944), German businessman
- Anton Schlembach (1932–2020), German bishop
- Anton Schlossar (1849–1942), Austrian librarian and writer
- Anton von Schmerling (1805–1893), Austrian statesman
- Anton Edler von Schmid (1765–1855), Austrian printer and publisher of Hebrew books
- Anton Schmid, multiple people
- Anton Schnack (1892–1973), German writer
- Anton Schneeberger (1530–1581), Swiss botanist
- Anton Schneider (1831–1890), German zoologist
- Anton Schnider (1936–2023), Swiss footballer
- Anton Schott (1846–1913), German dramatic tenor
- Anton Schrödl (1820–1906), Austrian painter
- Anton Schrötter von Kristelli (1802–1875), Austrian chemist
- Anton Schulthess-Rechberg (1855–1941), Swiss medical doctor and entomologist
- Anton Schumacher (born 1938), German footballer
- Anton Schütz (1894–1977), German-American artist
- Anton Schwartz (born 1967), American jazz saxophonist and composer
- Anton Schwarzkopf (1924–2001), German engineer of amusement rides
- Anton Martin Schweigaard (1808–1870), Norwegian politician
- Anton Schweitzer (1735–1787), German composer
- Anton Sealey (born 1991), Bahamian footballer
- Anton Sebastianpillai (1945–2020), British author and consultant geriatrician
- Anton Segner (born 2001), German rugby union player
- Anton Sekret (born 1992), Russian footballer
- Anton Sema (born 1978), Russian rower
- Anton Sereda (born 1980), Russian footballer
- Anton Shagin (born 1984), Russian actor
- Anton Shammas (born 1950), Palestinian writer, poet and translator
- Anton Shamonin (born 2005), Russian footballer
- Anton Shantyr (born 1974), Russian cyclist
- Anton Shekhovtsov (born 1978), Ukrainian political scientist
- Anton Shendrik (born 1986), Ukrainian footballer
- Anton Shenfeld (born 1993), Russian ice hockey player
- Anton Shepelew (born 1989), Belarusian footballer
- Anton Shevchuk (born 1990), Ukrainian footballer
- Anton Shibalov (born 1984), Russian rally driver
- Anton Shipilov (born 1973), Russian footballer and coach
- Anton Shipulin (born 1987), Russian biathlete
- Anton Shitov (born 2000), Russian footballer
- Anton Shoutvin (born 1989), Israeli basketball player
- Anton Shramchenko (born 1993), Belarusian footballer
- Anton Shulepov (born 1996), Russian figure skater
- Anton Shunin (born 1987), Russian footballer
- Anton Shunto (born 1988), Belarusian footballer
- Anton Shynder (born 1987), Ukrainian footballer
- Anton Sidelnikov (born 1981), Russian footballer
- Anton Sigurðsson (born 1987), Icelandic film director and screenwriter
- Anton Sikharulidze (born 1976), Russian pair skater
- Anton Silayev (born 2006), Russian ice hockey player
- Anton Siluanov (born 1963), Russian politician and economist
- Anton Silva (born 1964), Sri Lankan footballer
- Anton Sinapov (born 1993), Bulgarian biathlete
- Anton Sintsov (born 1991), Russian road and mountain bike racer
- Anton Sinyak (born 1999), Russian footballer
- Anton Sistermans (1865–1926), Dutch baritone
- Anton Skachkov (born 1979), Ukrainian Paralympic athlete
- Anton Skalon (1767–1812), Russian commander
- Anton Skipper (born 1999), Danish footballer
- Anton Skulberg (1921–2012), Norwegian politician
- Anton Slavchev (born 1995), Bulgarian footballer
- Anton Slepyshev (born 1994), Russian ice hockey player
- Anton Sloboda (born 1987), Slovak footballer
- Anton Slodnjak (1899–1983), Slovene literary historian
- Anton Martin Slomšek (1800–1862), Slovenian bishop
- Anton Sluka (born 1960), Slovak Paralympic athlete
- Anton Smirnov, multiple people
- Anton Smit (born 1945), Dutch screenwriter and producer
- Anton Smit (sculptor), South African sculptor
- Anton Smith (born 1985), English footballer
- Anton Smith-Meyer (1919–2011), Norwegian diplomat
- Anton Smolski (born 1996), Belarusian biathlete
- Anton Smyslov (born 1979), Russian footballer
- Anton Lembit Soans (1885–1966), Estonian architect
- Anton Soedjarwo (1930–1988), Indonesian chief of police
- Anton Søjberg (born 2000), Danish association football player
- Anton Sokał-Kutyłoŭski (1892–1983), Belarusian independence activist
- Anton Wilhelm Solnitz (1709–1752), German Bohemian composer
- Anton Solomoukha (1945–2015), Ukrainian-French artist
- Anton Šoltis (born 1976), Slovak footballer
- Anton Šoltýs (1937–2022), Slovak alpine skier
- Anton Sommerseth (1909–1998), Norwegian politician
- Anton Sorokin (born 1996), Belarusian footballer
- Anton Sosnin (born 1990), Russian footballer
- Anton Spasov (born 1975), Bulgarian footballer
- Anton Spiridonov (born 1998), Russian-American ice dancer
- Anton Matthias Sprickmann (1749–1833), German lawyer and writer
- Anton Heinrich Springer (1825–1891), German art historian and writer
- Anton Srholec (1929–2016), Slovak Roman Catholic priest and writer
- Anton von Stabel (1806–1880), German judge and politician
- Anton Stabrovskyy, Ukrainian Paralympic swimmer
- Anton Stach (born 1998), German association football player
- Anton Stadler (1753–1812), Austrian musical artist
- Anton Stamitz (1750–c. 1800), German composer and violinist
- Anton Stankowski (1906–1998), German painter
- Anton Starkopf (1889–1966), Estonian sculptor
- Anton Šťastný (born 1959), Slovak ice hockey player
- Anton Staus (1872–1955), German astronomer
- Anton Steck (born 1965), German violinist and conductor
- Anton Štefánek (1877–1964), Slovak politician and sociologist
- Anton Stegmann (1883–1972), South African rugby union player
- Anton Steiner (born 1958), Austrian alpine skier
- Anton Stevens (c. 1608–1675), Bohemian painter
- Anton von Störck (1731–1803), Austrian pharmacologist
- Anton Storch (1892–1975), German politician
- Anton Stråka (born 1998), Finnish ice hockey player
- Anton Strålman (born 1986), Swedish ice hockey player
- Anton Strashimirov (1872–1937), Bulgarian writer
- Anton Strassgschwandtner (1827–1881), Austrian painter and lithographer
- Anton Stres (born 1942), Slovenian Catholic bishop
- Anton Strohmayer (1848–1937), Austrian musician
- Anton Ström (1910–1994), Swedish sailor
- Anton D. Strouf (1884–1940), American politician
- Anton Strout (1970–2020), American writer
- Anton Subikshan (born 1998), Indian cricketer
- Anton Suchkow (born 2002), Belarusian footballer
- Anton Sukartono Suratto (born 1974), Indonesian politician
- Anton Sullivan (born 1991/1992), Offaly Gaelic footballer
- Anton Summer (born 1967), Austrian judoka
- Anton Suseno (born 1971), Indonesian table tennis player
- Anton Susha (born 2000), Belarusian footballer
- Anton Sushkevich (1889–1961), Russian mathematician
- Anton Švajlen (1937–2026), Slovak footballer
- Anton Sychev (born 1994), Russian rugby union player
- Anton Syrée (1859–1924), South African-born English cricketer and doctor
- Anton Sytnykov (born 1991), Ukrainian footballer
- Anton Sztáray (1740–1808), Austrian general

=== T ===
- Anton Tabakov (born 1960), Russian actor
- Anton Tabone (born 1937), Maltese politician
- Anton Tamarut (1932–2000), Croatian Roman Catholic prelate
- Anton Tanghe (born 1999), Belgian footballer
- Anton Teetsov (1889–1941), Estonian politician
- Anton Terekhov (footballer) (born 1998), Russian footballer
- Anton Terekhov (handballer) (born 1992), Ukrainian handball player
- Anton Tereschenko (born 1995), Belarusian footballer
- Anton Teuma (born 1964), Gozitan prelate of the Catholic Church
- Anton Teyber (1756–1822), Austrian musician
- Anton Thernes (1892–1944), German Nazi SS deputy commandant of concentration camp executed for war crimes
- Anton Thraen (1843–1902), German astronomer
- Anton Tideman (born 1992), Swedish footballer
- Anton Tikhomirov (born 1990), Russian ice hockey player
- Anton Tinnerholm (born 1991), Swedish footballer
- Anton Wilhelm Tischbein (1730–1804), German painter
- Anton Dayasritha Tissera (born 1966), Sri Lankan Sinhala politician
- Anton Emil Titl (1809–1882), Austrian composer and conductor
- Anton Ferdinand Titz (1742–1811), German composer and violinist
- Anton Tkáč (1951–2022), Slovak track cyclist
- Anton Tkachev (born 1994), Russian politician
- Anton Tohill (born 1999), Australian rules football player
- Anton Tokarev (born 1984), Russian pair skater
- Anton Tolordava (born 1996), Georgian footballer
- Anton Toolanen (born 1997), Swedish ice hockey player
- Anton Torello (1884–1960), Catalan musical artist
- Anton Toscani (1901–1984), Dutch race walker
- Anton Tremmel (born 1994), German alpine skier
- Anton Treuer, American academic and author
- Anton von Troeltsch (1829–1890), German otologist
- Anton Troianovski (born 1985), Soviet-born American journalist
- Anton Tsarenko (born 2004), Ukrainian footballer
- Anton Tsirin (born 1987), Kazakh international footballer
- Anton Tsvetanov, Bulgarian long-distance runner
- Anton Tus (1931–2023), Croatian general

=== U ===
- Anton Uesson (1879–1942), Estonian politician and engineer
- Anton Corfiz Ulfeldt (1699–1769), Austrian politician and diplomat
- Anton Ulrich, Duke of Saxe-Meiningen (1687–1763), Duke of Saxe-Meiningen
- Anton Unseld (1894–1932), German footballer and manager
- Anton Unterkofler (born 1983), Austrian snowboarder
- Anton Urban (1934–2021), Slovak footballer
- Anton Urspruch (1850–1907), German composer and pedagogue
- Anton Usnik (born 1973), Slovenian footballer
- Anton Usov (born 1994), Russian footballer
- Anton Aleksandrovich Utkin (born 1967), Russian writer, film director, director and novelist

=== V ===
- Anton Vaino (born 1972), Russian diplomat and politician
- Anton R. Valukas, American lawyer
- Anton Vamplew (born 1966), British astronomer
- Anton Maria Vannucchi (1724–1792), Italian jurist and writer
- Anton Vasilyev, multiple people
- Anton Vasyutinsky (1858–1935), Russian painter
- Anton Velim (1892–1954), Austrian painter
- Anton Velkov (born 1968), Bulgarian footballer and manager
- Anton Venier, Austrian luger
- Anton Vergilov (born 1985), Bulgarian footballer
- Anton Versluijs (1893–1982), Dutch painter
- Anton Vickerman, British DJ and website operator
- Anton Villatoro (born 1970), Guatemalan cyclist
- Anton Vilsmeier (1894–1962), German chemist
- Anton Vlasov (born 1989), Russian footballer
- Anton Vogel (1913–1971), Austrian wrestler
- Anton Volchenkov (born 1982), Russian ice hockey player
- Anton Vorobyev (born 1990), Russian cyclist
- Anton Vovk (1900–1963), Catholic bishop
- Anton Vratuša (1915–2017), Slovenian politician and diplomat
- Anton Vriesde (born 1968), Dutch footballer

=== W ===
- Anton Wackerle (born 1938), German bobsledder
- Anton Fran Wagner (1712–1782), Slovenian politician
- Anton Wahlberg (born 2005), Swedish ice hockey player
- Anton Waisbecker (1853–1916), Hungarian botanist
- Anton Walbrook (1896–1967), Austrian actor
- Anton Walkes (1997–2023), English footballer
- Anton Walser (politician), Liechtenstein politician
- Anton Walter (1752–1826), German piano builder
- Anton Walter (cellist) (1883–1950), Austrian cellist
- Anton Watson (born 2000), American basketball player
- Anton Webern (1883–1945), Austrian composer
- Anton Wede (born 1990), Swedish footballer
- Anton Wedin (born 1993), Swedish professional ice hockey forward
- Anton Weibel (born 1941), Swiss footballer
- Anton Weichselbaum (1845–1920), Austrian pathologist and bacteriologist
- Anton Joseph Weidenbach (1809–1871), German archivist and historian
- Anton Weiss-Wendt (born 1973), Norwegian academic and historian
- Anton Weissenbacher (born 1965), Romanian footballer
- Anton Wembacher (born 1955), German luger
- Anton H. Wentworth (1897–2001), American politician
- Anton von Werner (1843–1915), German painter
- Anton Weselak (1918–1989), Canadian politician
- Anton Westerlin (born 1994), Danish producer and songwriter
- A. L. Westgard (1865–1921), highway pioneer and photographer
- Anton von Wietersheim (born 1951), Namibian politician
- Anton van Wilderode (1918–1998), Belgian diocesan priest, teacher, writer and poet
- Anton Wildgans (1881–1932), Austrian poet and playwright
- Anton Wilfer (1901–1976), Czechoslovak luthier
- Anton Windfelder, German zoologist and immunologist
- Anton Winkelmann (born 2003), German canoeist
- Anton Winkler (1954–2016), West German luger
- Anton von Winzor (1844–1910), governor of Bosnia and Herzegovina
- Anton Wolf (1933–2010), Austrian footballer
- Anton van Wouw (1862–1945), South African sculptor
- Anton Wright (born 1974), adventurer and entrepreneur

=== Y ===
- Anton Yashkov (born 1992), Ukrainian footballer
- Anton Yatsenko (born 1977), Ukrainian politician
- Anton Yelchin (1989–2016), Russian-American actor
- Anton Yelizarov (born 1981), Russian military and mercenary leader
- Anton Yugov (1904–1991), Bulgarian politician

=== Z ===
- Anton Zabolotny (born 1991), Russian footballer
- Anton von Zach (1747–1826), Austrian general
- Anton Zadereyko (born 1999), Ukrainian footballer
- Anton Zaitcev (born 1987), Russian tennis player
- Anton Zakharov (born 1986), Ukrainian Olympic diver
- Anton Zappelli (born 1971), Australian Paralympic shooter
- Anton Zarutskiy (born 1986), Russian rower
- Anton Zaslavski also known as Zedd (born 1989), Russian-German music producer and DJ
- Anton Zeilinger (born 1945), Austrian quantum physicist
- Anton Zemlyanukhin (born 1988), Kyrgyzstani footballer
- Anton Zensus (born 1958), German radio astronomer
- Anton Zhebrak (1901–1965), Soviet botanist
- Anton Zhukov, multiple people
- Anton Zilzer (1860–1921), Hungarian painter
- Anton Zingarevich, Russian businessman
- Anton Zinkovsky (born 1996), Russian footballer
- Anton Zischka (1904–1997), Austrian author and journalist
- Anton Žlogar (born 1977), Slovenian footballer
- Anton Zorich (born 1962), Russian mathematician
- Anton Georg Zwengauer (1850–1928), German painter
- Anton Zwerina (1900–1973), Austrian weightlifter
- Anton van Zyl (born 1980), South African rugby player

== Fictional characters ==
- Anton, mythological son of Hercules created by Mark Antony, and from whom he claimed descent
- Anton, aka Tony, former co-leader of the gang, the Jets, from West Side Story
- Anton O'Neill, title role of feature film Anton, directed by Graham Cantwell
- Anton, fictional geneticist, credited with discovering Anton's Key, in the Ender's Game series of books by Orson Scott Card
- Anton Chigurh, antagonist in the Cormac McCarthy novel No Country for Old Men and the 2007 movie of the same title
- Anton Phibes, murderous organist in two cult movies starring Vincent Price
- Anton Steenwijk, protagonist in the Harry Mulisch novel The Assault
- Anton Jackson, a homeless person portrayed by Damon Wayans in the American comedy sketch show In Living Color
- Anton Ego, food critic in the 2007 Pixar film Ratatouille
- Anton Gorodetsky, hero and narrator of most of the Watch novels by Sergei Lukyanenko
- Anton Herzen, supposed vampire in Professor Layton and the Diabolical Box who lived in Herzen Castle
- Anton Tobias, main character in the horror comedy film Idle Hands, played by actor Devon Sawa
- Anton Shudder, side character in the Skulduggery Pleasant series
- Anton Hofmiller, main character in the book Beware of Pity, written by Stefan Zweig
- Anton Vanko, name of two Marvel Comics characters: Crimson Dynamo and Whiplash
- Anton Zeck, a master thief hired to steal Shredder's helmet in TMNT 2012
- Anton Krieg, a German black market kingpin in Wolfenstein 2009
- Frederick Anton Reiker, male protagonist in the book Summer of My German Soldier by Bette Greene
- Anton, a character from The Amazing World of Gumball
- Anton, Gilfoyle's server in Silicon Valley
- Antoine Roquentin, diarist/narrator of Jean-Paul Sartre's novel Nausea
- Anton Lavrentievich G______v, narrator of Fyodor Dostoyevsky's novel Demons
- Dynamite Anton, titular protagonist of indie games Antonball Deluxe and Antonblast
- Anton Ivanov, a playable character from the video game Zenless Zone Zero

== See also ==
- Anton (disambiguation)
- Anton (surname)
- Antanas
- Anthon (given name)
- Antoan
- Antona (name)
- Antono (name)
- Antoon
- Antos (name)
- Antoun
- Antun
- Antton (name)
- Antxon, name
