= Anton Zhukov =

Anton Zhukov may refer to:

- Anton Zhukov (footballer, born 1968), Russian football player
- Anton Zhukov (footballer, born 1982), Russian football player
