= Anton Olsson =

Anton or Tony Olsson may refer to:

- Anton Olson (1881–?), Swedish chess master
- Anton Olsson (ice hockey) (born 2003), Swedish ice hockey player
- Tony Olsson (born 1965), Swedish motorcycle speedway rider
- Tony Olsson (criminal), convicted of the murder of two police officers
- Anton Olsson, a character in the 1973 film Anton

== See also ==
- Anton Olsen (disambiguation)
- Olsson (surname)
