= Anton Koch =

Anton Koch may refer to:

- Joseph Anton Koch (1768–1839), Austrian painter
- Anton Koch (footballer) (1903–1963), Austrian footballer
- Anton Friedrich Koch (born September 17, 1952), German philosopher
