= Anton Fischer =

Anton Fischer may refer to:

- Anton Fischer (bobsleigh), bobsledder who competed for West Germany in the 1980s
- Anton Fischer (composer) (1778–1808), German composer and tenor
- Anton Hubert Fischer (1840–1912), German archbishop
- Anton Otto Fischer (1882–1962), illustrator for the Saturday Evening Post
