= Anton Karlsson =

Anton Karlsson may refer to:

- Anton Karlsson (ice hockey, born 1993)
- Anton Karlsson (ice hockey, born 1996)
- Anton Karlsson (golfer)
- Anton Karlsson (speedway rider)
