= Antonius Gosswin =

Flemish composer

Antonius Gosswin, also given as Anton Gosswin or Anthoine Gosswin. Other surname variants include Jusswein, Jussonius, Cossiono, Gossovino, Josquinus (prob. Liege c. 1546 – Freising, Liege or Bonn between 2 June 1597 and 28 October 1598), was a Flemish composer.

== Life ==
He is documented as a singer at Munich Court in 1568, he was then appointed court Kapellmeister at Landshut in 1569 to return to Munich in 1570, as organist at the Peterskirche in 1577. In 1580 he became Kapellmeister to the Bishop of Freising.

== Works ==
=== Sacred ===
- Cantiones, 4vv (Nuremberg, 1581); lost
- Cantiones sacrae, 5, 6vv (Nuremberg, 1583); lost
- Ad te levavi oculos meos, 6vv, 1583
- Laetatus sum, 6vv, 1583
- Missa a cappella, 4vv
- Missa super 'Cognovi Domine', 4vv
- Missa ferialis, 5vv
- Missa super 'Le mois de mai'
- Missa super 'Missus est angelus', 5vv
- Missa super 'Vrai Dieu, disait', 4vv
- 1 other mass
- In te Domine speravi, 3vv
- Iste est Johannes, 5vv, lost

=== Secular ===
- Newe teutsche Lieder ... welche gantz lieblich zu singen, auch auff allerley Instrumenten zu gebrauchen, 3vv (Nuremberg, 1581)
- Madrigali, 5vv (Nuremberg, 1615), lost
- Eolo crudel come turbasti l'onde, 5vv
- Qual meraviglia, 5vv
- Non trovo cosa alcuna s'io non pago, 5vv

== Recordings ==
- Antoine Gosswin: Selected Works Le Miroir de Musique, Baptiste Romain. Ricercar 2023
