= Anton Marcinčin =

Slovak politician and economist

Member of the National Council
- In office 2010–2012

Personal details
- Born: 26 October 1968 (age 57) Prešov, Czechoslovakia (now Slovakia)
- Party: Christian Democratic Movement
- Education: Charles University; CERGE-EI; Czech Technical University in Prague

Anton Marcinčin (born 26 October 1968 in Prešov) is a Slovak economist and former MP of the National Council.

== Early life ==
Marcinčin studied economics at CERGE-EI, eventually defending his PhD at the Charles University in 1999. Between 2000 and 2008 he worked at the World Bank.

== Political career ==
In 2010 Slovak parliamentary election, Marcinčin became an MP on the Christian Democratic Movement list. He was a member of finance and budget committee of the National Council.

In 2016, Marcinčin became government representative for underdeveloped regions. In 2018 his office was abolished and its agenda was taken over Richard Raši, the Deputy PM for informatization and investments. Marcinčin was also active as an adviser of the Minister of Finance Peter Kažimír and the Prešov region governor Milan Majerský .
