= Anton Balthasar König =

German historian and genealogist

- Born: 13 December 1753
- Died: 14 January 1814 (aged 60)
- Occupation: Historian

Anton Balthasar König was a German historian and genealogist. Born on 13 December 1753, King was a graduate of Cölln school and then worked as a registrar and secretary of the Generaldirektorium tätig. From about 1800 he was hired as the High Council Johanniterorden. King became famous for works of historical and genealogical content.

He died on 14 January 1814.

== Works ==
- Biographisches Lexikon aller Helden und Militärpersonen, welche sich in preussischen Diensten berühmt gemacht haben. 4 Teile, Berlin 1788–1791; Nachdruck in 4 Teilen: LTR, Starnberg 1989, ISBN 3-88706-305-8.
- Leben und Thaten Jakob Paul Freiherrn von Gundling, Königl.-Preussischen Geheimen Krieges-, Kammer-, Ober-Apellations- und Kammergerichts-Raths wie auch Zeremonienmeisters und Präsidenten bei der Königl. Societät der Wissenschaften etc. eines höchst seltsamen und abenteuerlichen Mannes, Berlin 1795 (Nachdruck: Berliner Handpresse, Berlin 1980)
- Berlin, von seiner Entstehung bis auf gegenwärtige Zeit historisch-geographisch beschrieben. Nebst einigen Bemerkungen über Literatur, Sitten und Gebräuche seiner Einwohner, Dieterici, Berlin 1798
- Authentische Nachrichten von dem Leben und den Thaten George Freiherrn von Derfflinger,
