= Anton Abad Chavarria =

Spanish singer-songwriter

Anton Abad Chavarria (born 1958 in Saidi, Baix Cinca) is a poet and the best known Catalan singer-songwriter in the Aragon region of Spain.

== Discography ==
Avui és un dia com un altre (Today it is a day like any other, 1989), Lo ball de la polseguera (The dance of the dust cloud, 1991), Cap problema (Any problem, 1995) Soc de poble (I'm from a village, 2002) and A la corda fluixa (To the tightrope, 2004). Many of his poems can be found in the anthology Joglars de frontera (Minstrels of the border, 1997), edited by Màrio Sasot.
