= Anton Fredrik Klaveness =

Anton Fredrik Klaveness may refer to:

- Anton Klaveness (Anton Fredrik Klaveness, 1874–1958), Norwegian ship-owner
- Anton Fredrik Klaveness (1903–1981), Norwegian equestrian and ship-owner
