= Anton Usov =

Russian footballer

Personal information
- Full name: Anton Olegovich Usov
- Date of birth: 12 May 1994 (age 32)
- Place of birth: Vladimir, Russia
- Height: 1.69 m (5 ft 6 1/2 in)
- Position: Defender

Senior career*
Years	Team	Apps	(Gls)
2010–2011	FC Torpedovets Vladimir		
2011–2012	FC Torpedo Vladimir	4	(0)
2012–2013	FC Volga Ulyanovsk	12	(1)
2013–2015	FC Torpedo Vladimir	45	(4)
2015–2016	FC Murom (amateur)		
- * Club domestic league appearances and goals

Anton Olegovich Usov (Russian: Антон Олегович Усов; born 12 May 1994) is a former Russian professional football player.

== Club career ==
He made his Russian Football National League debut for FC Torpedo Vladimir on 4 November 2011 in a game against FC Baltika Kaliningrad.
