= Anton Maria Kobolt =

German Catholic priest and historian (1752–1826)

Anton Maria Kobolt (16 November 1752 in Ingolstadt – 28 November 1826 in Altötting), oftentimes erroneously spelled Kobold, was a German Roman Catholic priest and historian.

== Biography ==
Kobolt was born to an officer. He began attending a school in Ingolstadt from 1764 until he went to the Jesuit College of Burghausen in 1764. He studied in the college until 1773, mainly philosophy in the last year. In 1773, he started studying philosophy at the University of Ingolstadt, eventually graduating as a Dr. phil. Then he studied theology as well as civil and canon law at Ingolstadt. He was ordained to priesthood on March 29, 1777, in Eichstätt.

Kobolt was appointed a canon to the Altötting Collegial Monastery through an electoral decree dated 29 April 1777. He assumed this position in 1778. He remained in Altötting until his death. He was appointed a member of the Bavarian Academy of Sciences and Humanities in 1795 or 1810.

== Published works (selection) ==
- Baierisches Gelehrten-Lexikon: worinn alle Gelehrte Baierns und der obern Pfalz, ohne Unterschied der Stände und Religion, welche bis auf das XVIII. Jahrhundert und zwar bis zum Ausgange des Jahrs 1724. daselbst gelebt und geschrieben haben, mit ihren sowohl gedruckten als noch ungedruckten Schriften nach alphabetischer Ordnung beschrieben und enthalten sind. Landshut: Hagen, 1795 (online)
  - Ergänzungen und Berichtigungen zum Baierischen Gelehrten-Lexikon. Landshut: Storno, 1825 (online)

== Bibliography ==
- Edmund von Oefele (1882). "Kobolt, Anton Maria" . Allgemeine Deutsche Biographie (in German). Vol. 16. Leipzig: Duncker & Humblot. p. 366.
- Clemens Alois Baader (1804). Das gelehrte Baiern oder Lexikon aller Schriftsteller, welche Baiern im achtzehnten Jahrhundert erzeugte oder ernährte (in German). Vol. 1. Nürnberg. pp. 600 and following.
