= Anton Bukhanko =

Russian ice hockey player (born 1986)

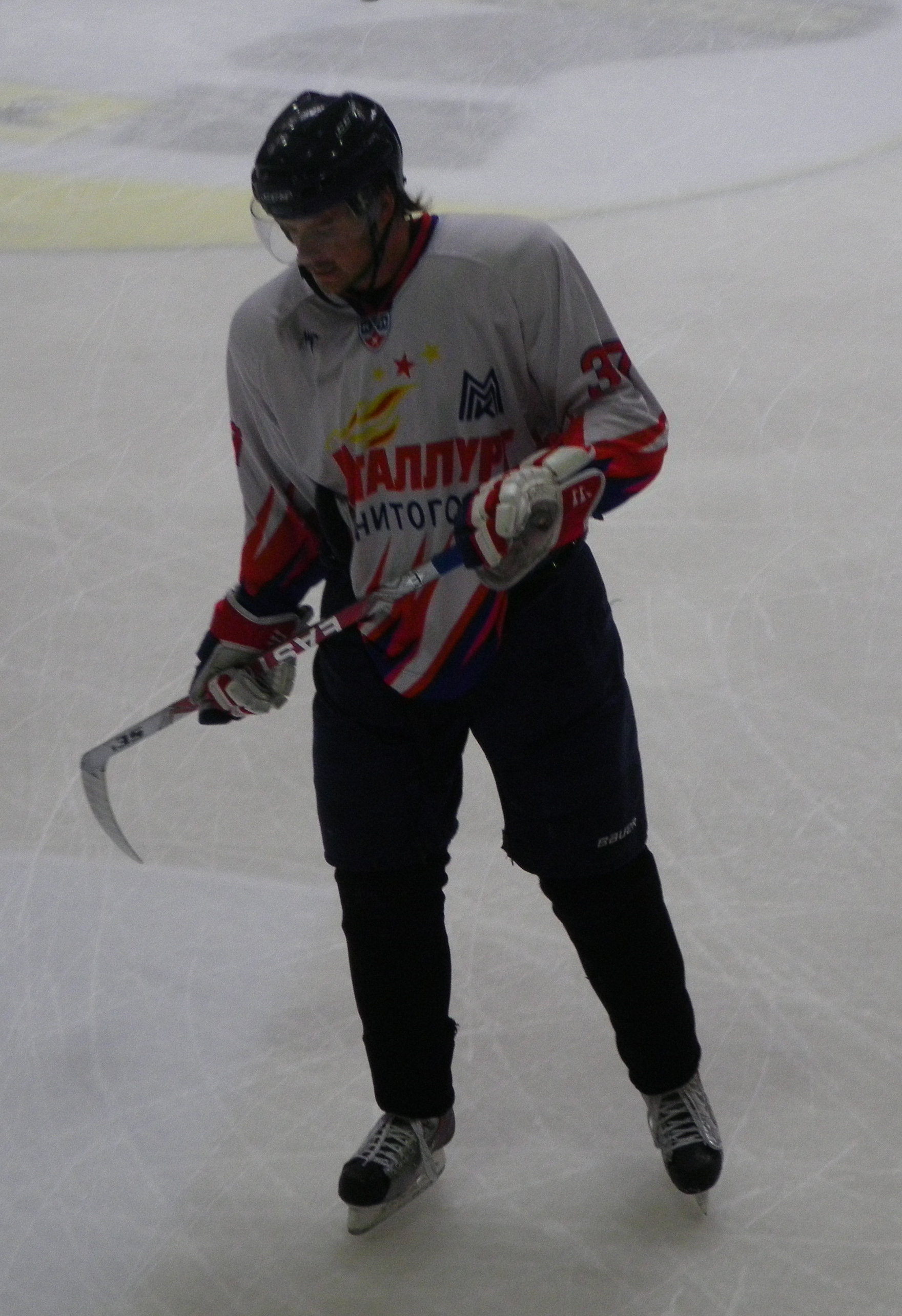
- Born: July 1, 1986 (age 38)
- Position: Defence
- KHL team: Metallurg Magnitogorsk
- Playing career: 2002–present

Anton Bukhanko is a Russian professional ice hockey defenceman who currently plays for Metallurg Magnitogorsk of the Kontinental Hockey League (KHL).
