= Anton Alberts =

Anton Alberts may refer to:

- Anton Alberts (architect) (1927–1999), Dutch architect
- Anton Alberts (politician) (born 1970), South African politician
