= Anton Georgiev =

Bulgarian academic

Anton Slavchev Georgiev
- Антон Славчев Георгиев

Academic work
- Discipline: Electrical engineering
- Institutions: Technical University of Varna

Anton Slavchev Georgiev (Bulgarian: Антон Славчев Георгиев, b. 1960) is a professor at Technical University of Varna.

== Early life ==
Anton Georgiev was born in Bourgas, Bulgaria. In 1979. he graduated high school at the Professional High School in Mechanics and Electronics in Bourgas. From 1979 to 1981 he was a soldier. From 1981 to 1986 he was a student at the Technical University of Varna, where he completed his master's degree in communications. From 1989 to 1993 he was a PhD student at the Technical University of Sofia.

In January 1994, he presented his doctoral thesis for his PhD, the topic of the doctoral thesis is "Problems of operational reliability of multiplex communication systems".

In May 2004 he became an associate professor in the Department of Electronics, Technical University of Varna.

In February 2016 he became a doctor of sciences. The topic of his doctoral thesis is Development, Research and Analysis of New Opportunities for Increase of the Operational Reliability of Electronic Systems. In this scientific treatise, for the first time in the theory of reliability, a fundamentally new method for presenting the type of maintenance of technical objects has been proposed and scientifically substantiated; he introduced new criteria for evaluating operational reliability have been derived; he introduced new criteria for evaluating the effectiveness of the different types of maintenance are mathematically justified.

Since 2019, he has been a full professor at the Technical University in Varna.

Since 2020, he is a full professor at the Medical University in Varna.

== Career ==
From 2011 to 2015 he was the Vice Dean of the Faculty of Electronics at Varna. On January 7, 2015, he became Head of Department for Academic Affairs at Varna. He sits on the Accreditation Council of NAОA to evaluate and accredit higher education institutions in Technical Sciences and Security and defense. He was awarded the "Golden Badge of Federation of Scientific and Technical Unions in Bulgaria - the Jubilee Congress celebrating 100 years of Scientific and Technical Unions in Varna", 2008. He became the Chairman of the Scientific and Technical Society "Electronics" of the NTS in 2002. He served as Vice Chairman of the General Meeting of the Faculty of Electronics mandate from 2007 to 2011. He served as Chairman of the State Board of Examiners for bachelor's degrees in the department Electronics and Microelectronics from 2012 - 2016. He joined the academic work committee of the Varna in 2011. He was a member of the "Commission for Elections" at Varna from 2011 to 2015.

He was an organizer and chairman of the regional competition Electronics and electrical engineering in Yambol in 2013. He was the Chairman of the Scientific Session Po5, 37th International Scientific Conference on information, communication and energy systems and technologies - ICEST 2002. He was the Chairman of Section 1, "Electronics and Communications" by Student scientific session of 2013. He was a member of the commission for acceptance of research projects in the Faculty of Electronics in 2009; and the committee for acceptance of research contracts in the Department of Electronics - 2010–2011, He was the chairman of the Department PO C-2 2012 Jubilee Congress, headlined "Science and education in the future". He was the secretary of the commission of the "Electronics" section in the Scientific Session of Varna in 2004. He reviews articles in the magazine Annual School Lectures Special. He reviewed 7 books - 3 textbooks, 3 guides for laboratories and three research projects. In 1992 he became an expert in electronic equipment. He produced over 1,000 pieces of technical advice on electronic equipment for various insurance companies. He is an Auditor of systems for quality management. In 2011 he led a team of auditors conducting internal audits at the Centre for Professional Training / CIE / at Varna and took part in the team auditing the Faculty of Marine Science and Ecology. He was a Member of the Council of the Faculty of Electronics at Varna (2006). He was Chairman of the Scientific juries reviewing the doctoral thesis of Dr Toncho Hr. Papanchev and Daniela Mareva. He was Chairman of the Scientific jury selection procedure for First Assistant DTK - Dobrich in 2016. He is a member of the Scientific jury at Varna in Communication and computer equipment, "Technology of electronic production". He was chairman from 2000 to 2011 for the Bulgaro-speaking training dept. "ETM". He became chairman in 2009 of the Department of Practical training of students English-language training. "ETM". He worked with students in "Electronica" from 2008 to 2011. He was a Member of the State Board of Examiners of the Telecommunications Equipment Department from 1996 - 1998. He became a Member of the State Board of Examiners in Department "Electronic equipment and Microelectronics" in 1999. He was a Member of the State Board of Examiners in "Dobrudzha College of Technology" in 2009. He serves as a Member of the Board of college at Varna. He is a Tutor of diploma theses of more than 90 students who are trained in Bulgarian and 15 students who are trained in English. He is the supervisor of two doctoral students who have defended their doctorate degrees - Toncho Papanchev and Yulia Garipova.

He works in 28 research projects, heading 5 of them.

== Institutions ==
- Technical University of Varna (1988-1989)
- Technical University of Sofia (1989-1990)
- Technical college of Dobrich (1998-2010)
- Institute of microelectronics in Bourgas (1996-1998)
- Burgas Free University (1997-1998)
- Technical University of Varna (1991-2019)
- Medical University of Varna (2019-to nowadays)

Georgiev had lectures in the Technical University of Varna and Medical University of Varna about Electronic Components, Semiconductors, Design and technology of electronic equipment, Reliability of electronic equipment, and Design and technology of communication equipment.
