= Anton Kalvaa =

Norwegian trade unionist and politician

Anton Kalvaa (1857–1922) was a Norwegian trade unionist and politician for the Labour Party.

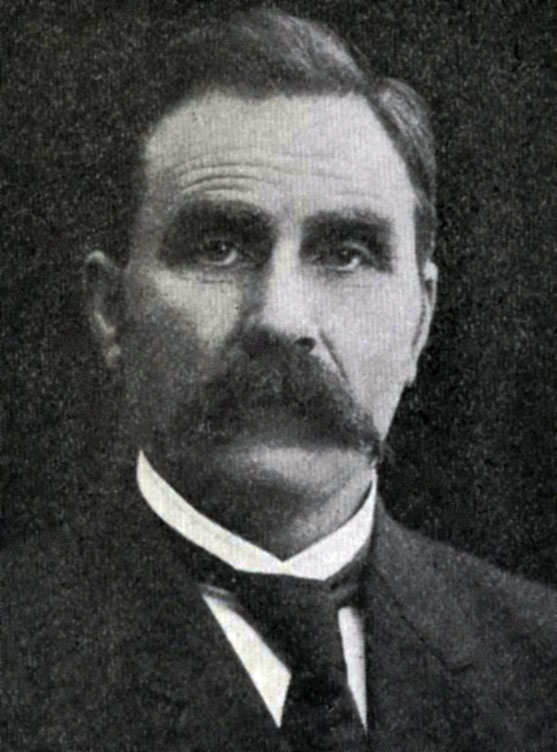
Anton Kalvaa

He joined the Labour Party in 1895. He served as a board member of the Norwegian Union of General Workers from 1902 to 1913, and was then hired as the Labour Party's secretary in Trondhjem. The leading figure of an oppositional wing within the party, Martin Tranmæl was based in that city, and Kalvaa supported him in the "municipal tactic" question; both meant that the Labour Party should not compromise their ideology to attain practical goals. In his heyday, Kalvaa was known as one of the most prolific and influential agitators of the trade union movement.
