= Anton Dimitrov =

Anton Dimitrov may refer to:

- Anton Dimitrov (footballer, born 1979), Bulgarian football defender
- Anton Dimitrov (footballer, born 1970), Bulgarian football striker
