= Anton Zhukov (footballer, born 1968) =

Russian footballer

Personal information
- Full name: Anton Yevgenyevich Zhukov
- Date of birth: 27 August 1968 (age 58)
- Height: 1.70 m (5 ft 7 in)
- Positions: Defender; midfielder

Senior career*
| Years | Team | Apps | (Gls) |
| 1990–1991 | FC Spartak Kostroma | 59 | (0) |
| 1992–1993 | FC Shinnik Yaroslavl | 25 | (0) |
| 1993–1994 | FC Metallurg Novotroitsk | 17 | (0) |
| 1994–1995 | FC Vympel Rybinsk | 39 | (4) |
| 1996–1997 | FC UralAZ Miass | 61 | (3) |
| 2000 | FC Spartak Yoshkar-Ola | 0 | (0) |
- * Club domestic league appearances and goals

Anton Yevgenyevich Zhukov (Russian: Антон Евгеньевич Жуков; born 27 August 1968) is a former Russian football player.
