= Anton Ivanov =

Anton Ivanov may refer to:

- Anton Ivanov (badminton) (born 1987), Russian badminton player
- Anton Ivanov (politician) (born 1985), Russian politician
- Anton Ivanov (sprinter) (born 1971), former Bulgarian sprinter
- Anton Ivanov-Goluboy (1818–1863), Russian painter
- Anton Alexandrovich Ivanov (born 1965), chairman of the Supreme Court of Arbitration of the Russian Federation
- Anton Ivanov (Marvel Cinematic Universe), a character in the TV series Agents of S.H.I.E.L.D.
