= Anton Wilfer =

Czech luthier

- Born: 30 April 1901; Luby, Bohemia, Austria-Hungary
- Died: 31 August 1976 (aged 75); Montreal, Canada
- Occupation: Luthier

Anton Wilfer (30 April 1901 – 31 August 1976) was a Czech luthier. He was known for building and repairing stringed instruments at his workshop, Anton Wilfer Co Ltd., in Montreal, Canada.

== Life and career ==
Wilfer was born in Luby, Bohemia, Austria-Hungary on 30 April 1901. His father and grandfather were luthiers. Wilfer studied and practised violin making in Luby before travelling in 1946 to Mittenwald, Bavaria, to hone his craft with master craftsmen.

In 1951, Wilfer moved to Montreal, Canada, where he opened a workshop, Anton Wilfer Co Ltd., with his sons-in-law, Alois Fogl and Ewald Fuchs. Together, they built and repaired such stringed instruments as violins, violas, cellos, double basses, and guitars. Their shop was originally located on Saint Catherine Street above the International Music Store, but was relocated in 1956 to a building at 2002 Mackay Street. By the 1970s, the shop began catering exclusively to the repairing of stringed instruments rather than their construction. Their clientele included members of the Montreal Symphony Orchestra, as well as other professional musicians from Montreal and from other provinces and countries. During his lifetime he made 75 violins, 15 violas, ten cellos and three double basses.

Wilfer was married. With her wife Franziska, he had two children. Following Wilfer's retirement, Fogl and Fuchs took over the management of the shop. Wilfer died in Montreal on 31 August 1976 after undergoing an operation. The shop closed in 1996.
