= Anton Dolin =

Anton Dolin may refer to:

- Anton Dolin (ballet dancer) (1904–1983), English ballet dancer and choreographer
- Anton Dolin (film critic) (born 1976), Russian film critic and journalist
