= Anton Kreß =

German footballer (1899–1957)

Personal information
- Date of birth: 8 June 1899
- Date of death: 3 January 1957 (aged 57)
- Position: Forward

Senior career*
Years	Team	Apps	(Gls)
- 1. FC Pforzheim

International career
1921	Germany	1	(0)
- * Club domestic league appearances and goals

Anton Kreß (8 June 1899 – 3 January 1957) was a German international footballer.
