= Antón Cabaleiro =

Spanish visual artist

Anton Cabaleiro
- Born: November 19, 1977 (age 47); Santiago de Compostela, Spain, Europe
- Occupation: Artist

Antón Cabaleiro (Santiago de Compostela, 1977) is a Spanish visual artist who has lived in New York City and currently lives in Spain.

Antón Cabaleiro is a PhD Cum Laude in Art, Design and Technology at the Complutense University, Spain. He received his undergraduate Fine Arts Degree from the Faculty of Fine Arts of Pontevedra, Spain (2002), his MS from Columbia University in New York City (2011), and his MFA in Computer Arts from the School of Visual Arts in New York City (2008).
He received a Foundation Barrie de la Maza grant to study in the United States. Other grants and awards include: First Prize in Photography from El Cultural Magazine, Spain; Erasmus programme for European Studies, Germany; and a Foundation Laxeiro Young Artist's Grant, Vigo, Spain.

Cabaleiro's works explore personal imagery based on the hybridization of different techniques. Conceptually, his work focuses on the crossings between humans, landscape, and technology.

He has exhibited extensively throughout Europe and the United States.
Past exhibitions include: MARCO, Museum of Contemporary Art, Vigo, Spain; the CAAC (Andalusian Center of Contemporary Art), Sevilla, Spain; ARCO International Fair of Contemporary Art, Madrid; The Cervantes Institute, Beijing, China and Lisbon, Portugal; Marlborough Gallery, Madrid; Loop International Fair of Video, Barcelona; and the Visual Arts Gallery, New York.
