= Anton Friedrich Koch =

German philosopher and academic

Anton Friedrich Koch (born 17 September 1952, Giessen) is a German philosopher and emeritus professor of philosophy at Heidelberg University.

== Life and work ==
Koch attended elementary school in Fronhausen (Lahn) and the Herderschule Giessen and studied philosophy and German language and literature at Heidelberg University from 1971, where he received his doctorate in May 1980 and worked as a research assistant from 1979 to 1981. From 1982 to 1989, he was a research assistant at the Institute of Philosophy at LMU Munich. He also completed his habilitation there in January 1989 with a thesis on Subjektivität in Raum und Zeit. He then remained at LMU Munich, now as a private lecturer and senior assistant, before moving to Martin Luther University Halle-Wittenberg from 1991 to 1993, where he was appointed to the Chair of History of Philosophy from 1993 to 1996. Between 1996 and 2009, he taught as Professor of Philosophy at the University of Tübingen, where he became acquainted with the Tübingen school of Plato, among others. From 2009 until his retirement in October 2020, he taught at Heidelberg University. In the spring semester of 2009, he held a visiting professorship at Emory University in Atlanta (Georgia) and in the winter quarter of 2016 a visiting professorship at the University of Chicago.

Koch has been a full member of the Heidelberg Academy of Sciences and Humanities since 2008.

== Publications (books) ==
- Vernunft und Sinnlichkeit im praktischen Denken, Königshausen und Neumann: Würzburg 1980 (Dissertation), ISBN 3-88479-025-0
- Subjektivität in Raum und Zeit (= Philosophische Abhandlungen, Band 57), Klostermann: Frankfurt a. M. 1990 (Habilitationsschrift), ISBN 3-465-02254-8
- Subjekt und Natur. Zur Rolle des „Ich denke“ bei Descartes und Kant, Mentis: Paderborn 2004, ISBN 3-89785-389-2
- Versuch über Wahrheit und Zeit, Mentis: Paderborn 2006, ISBN 3-89785-561-5
- Wahrheit, Zeit und Freiheit. Einführung in eine philosophische Theorie, Mentis: Paderborn 2006, 2. Aufl. Münster 2013, ISBN 978-3-89785-601-1
- Die Evolution des logischen Raumes. Aufsätze zu Hegels Nichtstandard-Metaphysik, Mohr Siebeck: Tübingen 2014, ISBN 978-3-16-153011-1
- Hermeneutischer Realismus, Mohr Siebeck: Tübingen 2016, ISBN 978-3-16-154377-7
- Philosophie und Religion, Kröner: Stuttgart 2020, ISBN 978-3-520-90004-3
