= Anton Kapotov =

Russian ice hockey player

- Born: June 30, 1991 (age 34) Novokuznetsk, USSR
- Height: 5 ft 7 in (170 cm)
- Weight: 165 lb (75 kg; 11 st 11 lb)
- Position: Defence
- Shoots: Left
- KHL team: Metallurg Novokuznetsk
- NHL draft: Undrafted
- Playing career: 2009–present

Anton Kapotov (born June 30, 1991) is a Russian professional ice hockey player. He is currently playing with Metallurg Novokuznetsk of the Kontinental Hockey League (KHL).

Kapotov made his Kontinental Hockey League debut playing with Metallurg Novokuznetsk during the 2009–10 KHL season.
