= Anton Schütz =

German-American artist (1894–1977)

Anton Friedrich Josef Schütz (April 19, 1894 – October 6, 1977) was a German-American artist and founder of the New York Graphic Society. He was born in Berndorf (Rhine-Province/Kingdom of Prussia/German Empire). Examples of his work can be found in the Smithsonian and the Uffizi. Schütz died in New York, United States.
