= Anton Løkkeberg =

Norwegian footballer (1927-1985)

Personal information
- Date of birth: 27 December 1927
- Date of death: 20 April 1985 (aged 57)

International career
Years	Team	Apps	(Gls)
1954	Norway	1	(0)

Anton Løkkeberg (27 December 1927 – 20 April 1985) was a Norwegian footballer. He played in one match for the Norway national football team in 1954.
