= Anton Rücker =

German footballer

Personal information
- Date of birth: 13 February 2001 (age 25)
- Place of birth: Eilenburg, Germany
- Height: 1.85 m (6 ft 1 in)
- Position: Defender

Team information
- Current team: Chemnitzer FC
- Number: 17

Youth career
- –2020: RB Leipzig

Senior career*
Years	Team	Apps	(Gls)
2020–2021	Leixões	3	(0)
2021–2022	FC Eilenburg	32	(0)
2022–2023	BFC Dynamo	1	(0)
2023–2024	FC Eilenburg	37	(0)
2024–	Chemnitzer FC	41	(0)

International career
2016–2017	Germany U16	4	(0)
2017	Germany U17	1	(0)
- * Club domestic league appearances and goals as of 22 June 2026

Anton Rücker (born 13 February 2001) is a German footballer who plays as a defender for Chemnitzer FC.

== Career ==
In 2020, Rücker signed for Leixões in the Portuguese second division from the youth academy of German Bundesliga side RB Leipzig.
