= Anton Gelonkin =

Russian bank chairman (born 1964)

- Born: c. 1964 (age 61–62)
- Other names: Anton Eduardovich Dolgov; Anton Peyton
- Occupations: Financier, criminal
- Criminal charges: conspiracy to defraud, Perverting the course of justice
- Penalty: 6 years imprisonment

Anton Gelonkin (born 1965) and known as Anton Eduardovich Dolgov (Russian: Долгов Антон Эдуардович) in Russia was a Russian bank chairman who disappeared during the 1995 collapse of the Moscow City Bank and later convicted of running an international organised internet based fraud in 2006.

== Moscow City Bank ==
Anton Eduardovich Dolgov (Russian: Долгов Антон Эдуардович; born 1965) was the chairman of the 18 December 1992 registered Moskovsky Gorodskoi Bank (Mosgorbank), or Moscow City Bank (MGB) (Russian: Московский городской банк (Мосгорбанк, МГБ)), and in late August 1995 allegedly fled to Malta after taking an unknown amount of money. The bank later collapsed with debts of 100 million US dollars.

== Identity theft racket ==
British police believe that from 1996 Anton then ran an organised international operation based in Notting Hill, London that defrauded American, British and Spanish bank account holders, and "systematically defrauded clearing banks and other financial institutions in Britain and abroad" and ran undetected for ten years.

The gang used compromised credit cards to first buy electrical goods, which they had delivered to a double layer of mailbox addresses - to reduce the connection between the fraudsters and the goods - and then later sold them on eBay both inside and outside the UK. Other activities involved: using stolen card details to set up online gambling accounts and diverting the winnings; and directing stolen money to hundreds of bank accounts.

In late 2004 police had raided the gang's presence in Barcelona, arresting Andreas Fuhrmann and issuing an Interpol international arrest warrant for Anthony Peyton (alias Gelonkin).

In January 2005 police were called to a burglary associated with the gang's headquarters, and noted the name Gelonkin, and later discovered the Interpol warrant. This resulted in a raid which resulted in the arrest of Estonian Aleksei Kostap, but not before Kostap was able to trigger a system that encrypted the records held on the gang's computers. Despite police IT expert efforts the data has not been decrypted. Kostav was found guilty of conspiracy to defraud and perverting the course of justice. Another gang member, Lithuanian Romanos Vasilauskas, admitted possessing false passports with intent and sentenced to eighteen months. Anton Gelonkin, 'admitted conspiracies to defraud, to obtain services by deception, to acquire, use and possess criminal property, and to remove it "from the jurisdiction"' and was sentenced for six years.
