= Anton La Vin =

Australian rugby union player

Anton La Vin is a rugby union player who currently plays for Eastern Suburbs RUFC in the New South Wales Shute Shield competition.

La Vin has represented Australia at Schoolboys, Under 19 & Under 21 level and has also represented the Classic Wallabies in the World Rugby Classic held in Bermuda in 2011 & 2012 claiming the World Rugby Classic title alongside rugby greats Matt Dunning, Andrew Johns & Brad Fittler.

La Vin is a Sydney representative player who has also played for the Australian Barbarians.
