= Anton Loginov =

Soviet journalist and propagandist (1882–1963)

Anton Loginov (Russian: Антон Логинов, born Mikhail Osipovich Loginov, Михаил Осипович Логинов; 31 January 1882 – 21 February 1963) was a Russian Bolshevik revolutionary, Communist Party member, journalist, writer, Soviet publicist, and propagandist of atheism.

Anton Loginov

== Life ==
Loginov was a member of the Russian Social Democratic Labour Party starting in 1902 and had the party nickname "Anton". He was also a member of the Tiflis City Party Committee and the Soviet of Soldiers' Deputies starting in 1918. From 1902 to 1912 he led illegal party work in Moscow and participated in many revolutions such as the First Russian revolution in Moscow and the October Revolution of 1917 in Tiflis.

Loginov was a born speaker and a witty polemist. Lenin learned of his ability to speak with the masses in a simple and understandable language, to attract interesting material and witty answers to questions. He advised Loginov to engage in anti-religious propaganda. From the beginning of the 1920s Loginov devoted himself entirely to atheistic work, and trained qualified personnel in the anti-religious campaign. The Moscow Party had appointed Loginov to Kostelovskaia's place on the Anti-religious Commission in March 1925, and by 1926 he was a leading League official. He was a member of the bureau of the district party committee, a member of the MK RCP (b), chairman of the Moscow and Central Soviet of Atheists, deputy People's Commissar of Communications, and editor of the newspaper and magazine "Bezbozhnik".

In the 1920s Loginov participated in disputes with representatives of the clergy. He focused on exposing the supposed counter-revolutionary activity of churchmen, the antiscientific and reactionary essence of religion, and the class implications of religious morality. Loginov was the author of many articles and brochures on atheism and on religion. His book was published under the name "Anton Loginov". Typical of a pamphlet aimed at the countryside was Anton Loginov's "The Godless: the Best Friend of the Peasant" (1925). "We do not want to take religion away from you", explained Loginov, "we just want you to give it up. "And what do you replace it with?", he has the peasant ask (quite realistically). His answer: “Evil does not have to be replaced, but simply rooted out. That is our program".

Loginov died in Moscow, and is buried in Novodevichy Cemetery.

== Work ==
- Логинов, Антон. Чего ищут польские паны у русского мужика в кармане? : (загадка мужику, чтобы был он на-чеку) / Антон Логинов; Российская коммунистическая партия (большевиков). - Москва : Агитационно-пропагандистский отдел Московского губкома Р.К.П., 1920. - 15 с.;
- Коммунизм и религия : Сборник материалов по антирелигиозной пропаганде. - Казань : Отд. политупр. Приволж. воен. окр., 1921. - 24 с.; 25 см. - (Библиотечка политработника; No. 2). Стр. 11-24: "Религия и коммунизм. (Материалы для агитаторов). Антон Логинов"
- Логинов, Антон. Наука и библия / Антон Логинов; Моск. ком. Р.К.П. - Москва : [Московский рабочий], 1922. - 38 с.;
- Логинов, Антон. Религия и нравственность : Учит ли добру священное писание? / А. Логинов; Моск. ком. РКП. - Москва : Московский рабочий, 1923. - 111 с.;
- Логинов, Антон. Веселые рассказы из священной истории / Текст Антона Логинова; Рис. Д. Моора. - Москва : Безбожник у станка, 1925. - 64 с. : ил.;
- Логинов, Антон. Безбожник - лучший друг мужика / Антон Логинов. - Москва : Безбожник, 1925. - 12 с.;
- Логинов, Антон. Вера и знание. (Есть ли бог?) : Лекция, чит. в Доме союзов 25 янв. 1925 г. / Антон Логинов. - Москва : журн. "Безбожник у станка", 1925. - 32 с.;
- Логинов, Антон. Наука и библия / Антон Логинов. - 2-е изд., испр. - Москва : Безбожник, 1925. - 68 с.;
- Логинов, Антон. Существует ли бог и почему в него люди верят : Сборник статей / Антон Логинов. - Иваново-Вознесенск : Основа, 1925. - 215, [3] с.;
- Логинов, Антон. Тезисы по вопросам цикловых выступления антирегилиозной пропаганды / Антон Логинов. - Иваново-Вознесенск : Основа, 1924. - 63 с.; 26 см. - (Материалы по [антирелигиозной] пропаганде; [Вып. 2]).
- Логинов, Антон. Тезисы по вопросам цикловых выступлений антирелигиозной пропаганды / Антон Логинов. - 2-е изд. - Иваново-Вознесенск : Основа, 1925. - 53 с.;
- Логинов, Антон. Легенда о Христе / Антон Логинов. - Москва : Безбожник, 1926. - 79 с.;
- Логинов, Антон. О господе боге и о святых его / Антон Логинов. - Москва : Безбожник, 1926. - 30 с.;
- Логинов, Антон. Веселые рассказы из священной истории : В 2 частях / Текст Антона Логинова; Рис. Д. Моора. - Москва; Ленинград : Московский рабочий, 1929 (7-я тип. "Искра революции" Мосполиграф). [Ч. 1-2]. - 1929. - 158, [2] с. : ил.;
- Логинов, Антон. Жития святых / Антон Логинов; Рис. М. Черемных. - Москва : Госиздат РСФСР "Московский рабочий", 1930 (14 тип."Мосполиграф"). - 174, [2] с. : ил.
- Логинов, Антон.Василий Григорьевич Шумкин / Ант. Логинов. - Москва : Старый большевик, 1932. - 96 с.; 15 см. - (Большевики подпольщики).
- Логинов, Антон. Легенда о христе / Антон Логинов; Центр. совет Союза воинств. безбожников СССР. - 2-е изд., испр. - [Москва] : Гаиз, 1933 (тип. "Образцовая"). - Обл., 94, [2] с.;
- Логинов, Антон. Сектантская контрреволюция перед пролетарским судом : Объясн. брошюра к серии киноплен. диапозитивов No. 49 / Логинов; Под общ. ред. ЦС Союза воинств. безбожников; Ф-ка киноплен. диапозитивов треста "Техфильм" Союзкино. - Москва : [б. и.], 1933. - Обл., 15 с., без т. л., 1 с. объявл.;
- Bibel und wissenschaft / Von Anton Loginow; Deutsch bearbeitet von Leo Sarne. - Moskau : Zentralverlag der volker der Sowjetunion, 1927 (книжная фабрика Центр. изд-ва народов СССР). - 55 с.;

== Notes ==
- Atheistic Dictionary / Логинов Михаил Осипович
- «Православие : Словарь атеиста» / [Беленкин И. Ф. и др.]. / Под общей редакцией доктора философских наук Н. С. Гордиенко/ - М. : Политиздат, 1988. - 270,[2] с.; 17 см.; ISBN 5-250-00079-7 / С. 123
