= Anton Klimenko =

Russian footballer

Personal information
- Full name: Anton Anatolyevich Klimenko
- Date of birth: 27 March 1985 (age 41)
- Height: 1.89 m (6 ft 2 1/2 in)
- Position: Defender

Senior career*
Years	Team	Apps	(Gls)
2002	FC Nart Nartkala	26	(0)
2003–2005	PFC Spartak Nalchik	4	(0)
2005	FC Torpedo Volzhsky	18	(0)
2006	PFC Spartak Nalchik	0	(0)
2007–2009	FC Kavkaztransgaz-2005 Ryzdvyany	55	(0)

Managerial career
- 2011: FC Kavkaztransgaz-2005 Ryzdvyany (administrator)
- 2015–2016: FC Dynamo Stavropol (administrator)
- * Club domestic league appearances and goals

Anton Anatolyevich Klimenko (Russian: Антон Анатольевич Клименко; born 27 March 1985) is a former Russian professional football player.

== Club career ==
He played two seasons in the Russian Football National League for PFC Spartak Nalchik.
