= Anton Vasyutinsky =

Russian painter

Anton Vasyutinsky (Ukrainian: Антон Федорович Васютинський, Russian: Антон Фёдорович Васютинский) (January 17, 1858, Kamianets-Podilskyi – December 2, 1935, Leningrad) was a Ukrainian and Russian painter, prominent designer of coins and medals in the Russian Empire and Soviet Union, professor of Imperial Academy of Arts in Saint Petersburg.

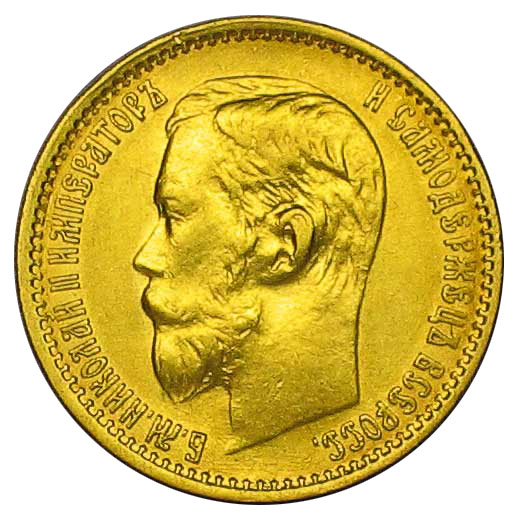
Russian Empire 5 rubles coin (1899), designed by Anton Vasyutinsky.
