= Anton Smit (sculptor) =

South African sculptor

Anton Sydney Smit (born 2 August 1954) is a contemporary South African sculptor known for his large-scale sculptures and public art exhibitions.

He is the father of South African artist Lionel Smit.

== Career ==
Smit began exhibiting his artwork in 1976 in South Africa. In 1979, he won the South African Association of Arts' New Signatures competition. His first solo exhibition was held in 1980 at the Beuster Skolimowski Gallery in Pretoria, South Africa, followed by additional local exhibitions throughout the 1980s.

Smit's first international exhibitions took place in 1991 in Rome and Milan, as well as at the Festival dei Due Mondi in Spoleto, Italy. This was followed by solo exhibitions at the Sweeguan Art Gallery in Singapore in 1993 and the Omni Gallery in New York in 1994.

In 1994, his work was exhibited at the inauguration of President Nelson Mandela at the Union Buildings in Pretoria, South Africa.

In 2003, he established the Anton Smit Sculpture Park at Bronkhorstspruit Dam, South Africa.

From the 2000s to the present, Smit has continued creating new works and exhibiting internationally.

== Style ==
Smit’s body of work comprises heads, human figures, nudes, masks, hands, angels, floating and stretching figures, warriors as well as abstract works in steel, metal, stone, a unique iron and polymer cast mixture, and bronze. His works often depict the human form reduced to a simplified symmetry, and are often patinated with vivid blue hues or dark rust.

== Selected gallery and public exhibitions ==
Smit has exhibited in numerous galleries since 1976.

- 1976: Etno Africa Gallery, Pretoria
- 1980: Solo exhibition, Beuster-Skolomowski Gallery, Pretoria
- 1980: A.P.S.A. National Exhibition at the Olivetti Gallery
- 1985: Exhibition, Michaelatos Gallery, The Joffa Collection, Los Angeles
- 1991: Exhibitions in Rome and Milan, Italy; exhibition at the Festival dei Due Mondi in Spoleto, Italy
- 1993: Solo exhibition at Sweeguan Art Gallery, Singapore
- 1994: Solo exhibition at Omni Gallery, New York
- 1994: Exhibition at the inauguration of President Nelson Mandela, Union Buildings, Pretoria, South Africa
- 1994: Exhibition in Bonn, Germany
- 1994: Public exhibition, Grand Central Station, New York
- 1996: Launch of the BMW 5 Series, Sandton Square, Johannesburg
- 1998: Exhibition at the South African Embassy, Bonn
- 1998: Solo exhibition, Artfolio Gallery, Singapore
- 1999: Exhibition at Inter Art Galerie Reich, Cologne, Germany
- 2000: Exhibition, Laguna Beach, California
- 2001: Exhibition, Hamburg, Germany
- 2005: The ID of South African Art, Scheveningen, Netherlands
- 2012: Transitions, George, South Africa
- 2016: Spirit of Tshwane, Menlyn on Maine, Pretoria, South Africa
- 2016: Colossal, Australian Bronze, Sydney, Australia
- 2017: SCOPE Art Fair, presented by DL Gallery, New York
- 2019: Ferrari Fine Arts Exhibition featuring Anton Smit, Johannesburg
- 2020: New Futurism, Uitstalling Gallery, Genk, Belgium
- 2021: SculptX, Fourth Edition, Johannesburg, South Africa
- 2022: Anton Smit: The Walk of Life, Leonardslee Gardens, Horsham, UK
- 2022: Contemporary South Africa, Thompson’s Gallery, London, UK
- 2023: Anton Smit Open Air Exhibition, Century City, Cape Town

== Selected collections ==
Rupert Art Foundation - Stellenbosch

Grande Provence – Franschhoek

Delaire Graff Estate - Stellenbosh

Lourensford – Somerset West

Benguela Cove – Hermanus

Century City Arts Foundation - Cape Town
