= Anton Toolanen =

Swedish ice hockey player

- Born: January 26, 1997 (age 28); Sweden
- Height: 5 ft 11 in (180 cm)
- Weight: 172 lb (78 kg; 12 st 4 lb)
- Position: Forward
- Shoots: Left
- SHL team: Luleå HF
- NHL draft: Eligible 2015
- Playing career: 2015–present

Anton Toolanen (born January 26, 1997) is a Swedish ice hockey player. He is currently playing with Luleå HF of the Swedish Hockey League (SHL). Toolanen made his Swedish Hockey League debut playing with Luleå HF during the 2014–15 SHL season.
