= Anton Doll =

German painter

Anton Doll was born the son of a teacher in Munich on 3 March, 1826 (1826-1887) was a German painter and was a member of the Munich Kunstverein. Notably, Doll depicted his home city of Munich with such a high level of accuracy, his art cityscapes are often studied for their historical value as documents of their time.

A leading member of the Munich School of painters, Doll was born on 3 March 1826, in Munich, Germany, and began his career studying law at the Ludwig-Maximilians-Universität München, but quickly shifted his focus to painting in 1849. Exhibited by the Munich Kunstverein institution, Doll followed in the footsteps of other traditional German landscape painters such as Heinrich Bürkel, Adolf Stademann, and Carl August Lebschée. Doll's landscapes and cityscapes frequently focus on areas of Central Europe, and can be found among the collections of important institutions like Neue Pinakothek in Munich and the Staatsgalerie Stuttgart in Stuttgart, among others. Doll died on 2 May 1887 in Munich, Germany.
