= Anton H. Wentworth =

American politician

Member of the Florida House of Representatives from Taylor County
- In office 1931

Personal details
- Born: March 8, 1897 Shady Grove, Florida, U.S.
- Died: January 21, 2001 (aged 103)
- Party: Democratic

Anton H. Wentworth (March 8, 1897 – January 21, 2001) was an American politician. He served as a Democratic member of the Florida House of Representatives.
