= Anton Syrée =

South African-born English cricketer and doctor

Anton Hugh Syrée (21 October 1859 – 9 January 1924) was a Cape Colony-born British medical doctor who played one first-class cricket match for Kent County Cricket Club in 1879.

Syrée was born at Port Corrie in Cape Colony in 1859. He made his only known senior cricket appearance against Nottinghamshire at Canterbury in June 1879.

Syrée was a member of the Royal College of Surgeons, living for a period at Northallerton in Yorkshire where his wife died in 1887. He died at Cheslyn Hay in Staffordshire in January 1924 aged 64, having committed suicide by administering an overdose of strychnine.

== Bibliography ==
- Carlaw, Derek (2020). Kent County Cricketers, A to Z: Part One (1806–1914) (PDF). Cardiff: ACS.
