= Anton Vasilyev =

Anton Vasilyev may refer to:

- Anton Vasilev, (born 1983), Russian canoe racer
- Anton Vasilyev (footballer), (born 1983), Russian footballer
