= Anton Krammer =

Austrian footballer (1929–1986)

Personal information
- Date of birth: 14 March 1929
- Place of birth: Bela Crkva, Kingdom of Yugoslavia
- Date of death: 20 October 1986 (aged 57)

International career
Years	Team	Apps	(Gls)
- Austria

Anton Krammer (14 March 1929 – 20 October 1986) was an Austrian footballer. He competed in the men's tournament at the 1952 Summer Olympics.
