= Anton Hecht =

English artist

Anton Hecht is an English artist born in London. In 2007 he asked musicians from around the Durham area to contribute to a soundtrack for a film. In 2005 he was one of seven artists involved in a project to recreate the Cumbrian town of Whitehaven in Lego.

His film Blinking Ballet, made with old people using morphing technology, has been screened at the Gateshead Interchange metro station. A poetry film, made with children from Shotton Colliery, was shown at the Royal Festival Hall's Poetry International 2000 festival. An early poetry film called I Am Romeo (1996) featured in a British Film Institute touring poetry show reel. He has exhibited a multimedia film at the Myles Meehan Gallery in the Darlington Arts Centre and has delivered workshops as part of Architecture Week. He is currently making a work where many people play individual notes. A recent narrative film Motivation, for the UK Film Council, is part of the British Council national touring scheme. He has also written and directed a number of theatre works that incooperate video with live performance, such as Rescued by Rover at Winsford Art Gallery and Having My Pretty at Hull Screen and his theatre work Wrestling Shakespeare, where Hamlet goes World Federation.

Perhaps now his most successful film work is The Trolley Dance, made with old people in Darlington. Over 50,000 people viewed it on YouTube and it was featured on the website of a national newspaper. Another work, using members of the local community with no playing experience to create a visual musical piece was called One Note Band, sometimes called The Spirits i have Called, and Variations this also was a featured video on YouTube and received a lot of web support as well as being shown in European festivals. A new work has been commissioned for the angle of the north celebrations, and is to be projected besides the landmark piece of sculpture, the work is a poetry film where people pose as the letters in and about the streets of gateshead.. A collaboration with film maker Richard Lawson on a short called Developed has been shortlisted for the Project direct competition on YouTube He has recently been commissioned to make a work for the Capture scheme run by the Film Council and a TV channel. This work was Bewick Court a musical, which received wide media attention and a premiere at the Baltic art gallery in Newcastle.
