= Anton Alekseev =

Anton Alekseev may refer to:

- Anton Alekseyev (born 1984), Ukraine-born Russian football player
- Anton Alekseev (mathematician) (born 1967), Russian mathematician
