= Anton Hofer =

Austrian politician and trade unionist (1927 - 2009)

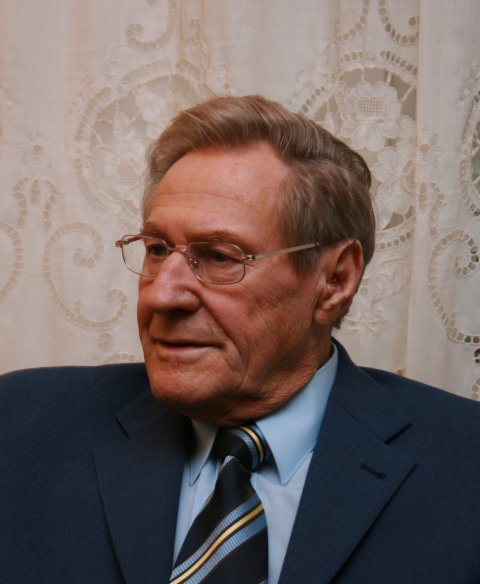
Anton Hofer (Gewerkschafter)

Anton Hofer (June 1, 1927 in Lichtenwörth, Austria – February 14, 2009 in Vienna, Austria), was an Austrian politician and trade unionist.

== Life ==
Anton Hofer learned after his school time, during World War II, the profession of an aircraft constructor and pilot. After the war and Russian war captivity, he changed to the oil industries - a forerunner model of the OMV AG - as a design draughtsman and blast engineer. Within a few months, he became head of the plant security. In his spare time, he found a new interest: volleyball. A major attendance in the Austrian volleyball team underlines his ability in the 1950s.

In 1955, he changed from the oil industries to politics and found his mission within the field of Austrian social policy. In this time he studied philosophy and history. In 1964 he was elected to the Austrian Chamber of Labour and did this job till the late 1980s. In 1970 he became head of the Gewerkschaftlichen Linksblock - a labour union within the Austrian Trade Union Federation and was a member of the Austrian Trade Union Federation Executive Board. Between 1970 and 1990, he was part of the council of the World Federation of Trade Unions. In 1990 he retired, and left politics.
