= Anton Hansen (cyclist) =

Norwegian cyclist

Personal information
- Born: 26 November 1886 Glemmen, Norway
- Died: 5 May 1915 (aged 28)

Cycling career
- Sport: Cycling

Anton Hansen (26 November 1886 – 5 May 1915) was a Norwegian cyclist. He competed in two events at the 1912 Summer Olympics.
