= Anton Alexander =

Anton Alexander may refer to:

- Anton Alexander (politician) (1870–1945), Norwegian educator and politician
- Anton Alexander (actor), English actor

== See also ==
- Count Anton Alexander von Auersperg (1806–1876), Austrian poet and politician
