= Anton Hangel =

Austrian weightlifter

Personal information
- Nationality: Austrian
- Born: 28 May 1904

Sport
- Sport: Weightlifting

Anton Hangel (born 28 May 1904, date of death unknown) was an Austrian weightlifter. He competed at the 1928 Summer Olympics and the 1936 Summer Olympics.
