= Anton Munukka =

Finnish footballer (born 2004)

Personal information
- Date of birth: 7 September 2004 (age 22)
- Place of birth: Lahti, Finland
- Height: 1.87 m (6 ft 2 in)
- Position: Goalkeeper

Team information
- Current team: SalPa

Youth career
- –2021: Lahti

Senior career*
Years	Team	Apps	(Gls)
2021–	Reipas Lahti	48	(0)
2021–2026	Lahti	7	(0)
2026–	SalPa	0	(0)

International career^{‡}
2022	Finland U18	1	(0)
2022	Finland U19	2	(0)
- * Club domestic league appearances and goals as of 23 November 2025 ‡ National team caps and goals as of 8 October 2023

Anton Munukka (born 7 September 2004) is a Finnish professional footballer who plays as a goalkeeper for Ykkösliiga club SalPa.

== Club career ==
=== FC Lahti ===
Munukka made his debut with FC Lahti on 19 February 2022, in a Finnish League Cup game against Ilves. He debuted in Veikkausliiga on 22 April 2023, coming in from the bench on the 59th minute, as a substitute to injured Marin Ljubić.

On 31 October 2023, FC Lahti announced that they had signed with Munukka on a new two-year deal, until the end of 2025.
