= Anton Meybusch =

German medallist

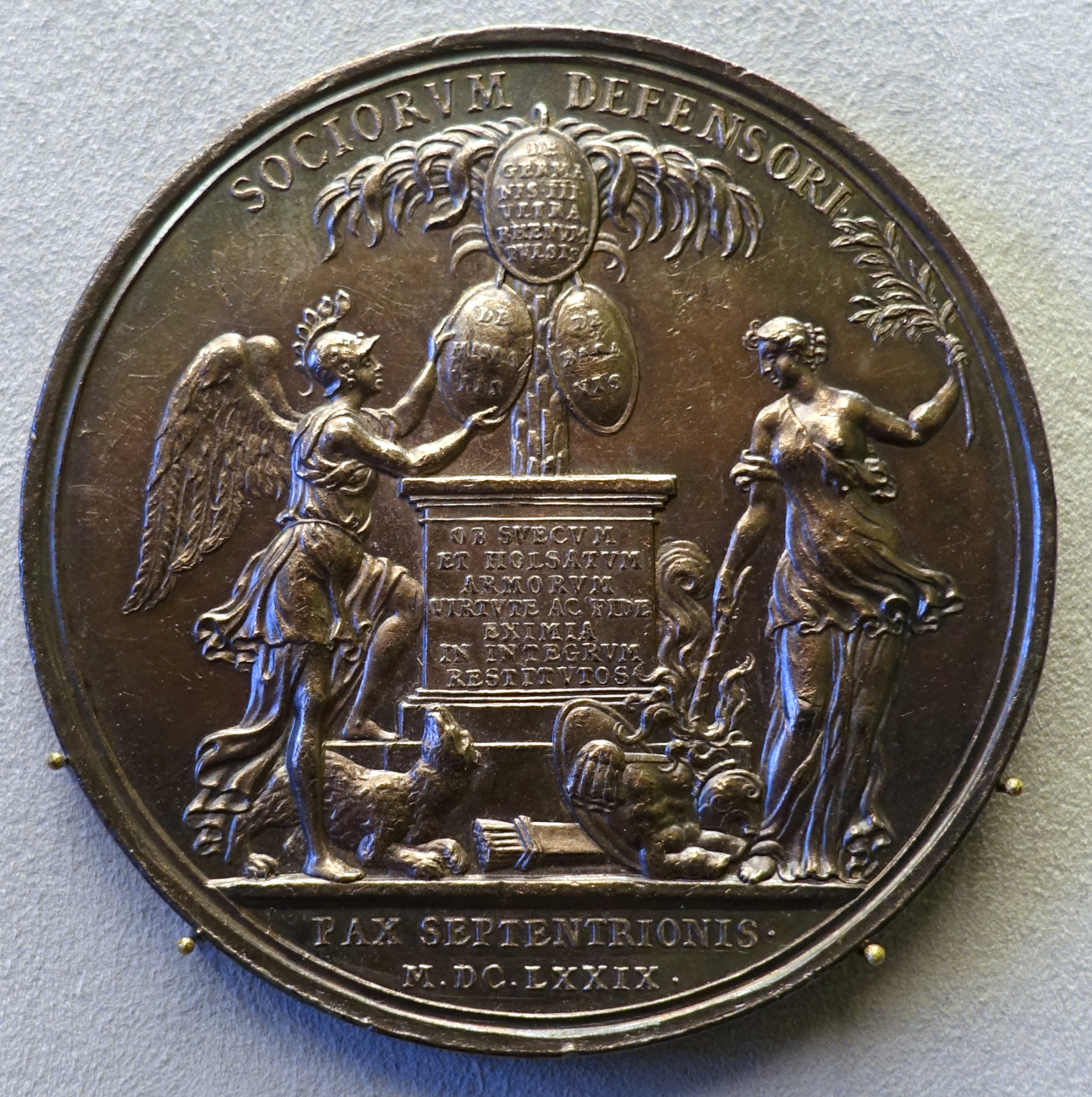
Louis XIV, Peace in the North, by Anton Meybusch, 1679

Anton Meybusch (1645 – May 1, 1702) was a German medallist active primarily in Copenhagen, but also in Paris from 1681 to 1690.

Meybusch apprenticed under Valentin Toutin in Stockholm in the 1660s, and perhaps in Copenhagen, where from 1667 to 1674 he worked for King Frederick III of Denmark and King Christian V of Denmark. In 1675 he moved to the Swedish Royal Mint in Stockholm where he worked as a die-cutter, but had his license revoked in 1676 for making coronation medals without authorization. His permit was eventually renewed in 1680 and 1683. However, in 1681 he relocated to the Paris mint as Médailleur du Roi de France for Louis XIV of France. For his travel he received 400 livres, and September 1687 a further total of 2,540 livres, as well 600 livres gratuity and 3300 livres for a coin-making machine of his invention. In 1690 he returned to Copenhagen, and in 1692 received a post at the Danish court with a salary of 1000 crowns per year.
