= Anton Byström =

Swedish ice hockey player

- Born: 4 August 1992 (age 33) Örnsköldsvik, Sweden
- Height: 6 ft 0 in (183 cm)
- Weight: 185 lb (84 kg; 13 st 3 lb)
- Position: Wing
- Shoots: Left
- Elitserien team: Modo Hockey
- Playing career: 2010–present

Anton Byström (born August 4, 1992) is a Swedish professional ice hockey player. He played with Modo Hockey in the Elitserien during the 2010–11 Elitserien season.
