= Anton Barnard =

South African rugby union footballer

- Born: Anton Stephanus Barnard; 7 April 1958 (age 68) George, Western Cape
- Height: 1.81 m (5 ft 11 in)
- Weight: 106 kg (234 lb)
- School: Cillie High School, Port Elizabeth

Rugby union career
Provincial / State sides
Years	Team	Apps	(Points)
1981–1988	Eastern Province	82	
International career
Years	Team	Apps	(Points)
1984–1986	South Africa	4	

Anton Stephanus Barnard (born 7 April 1958) is a former South African rugby union player.

== Playing career ==
Barnard played for Eastern Province in the South African provincial competitions and for the Springboks. He made his test debut against the visiting South American Jaguars team on 20 October 1984 at Loftus Versveld in Pretoria.

=== Test history ===
No.	Opponents	Results (SA 1st)	Position	Points	Dates	Venue
1.	South American Jaguars	32–15	Loosehead prop		20 Oct 1984	Loftus Versfeld, Pretoria
2.	South American Jaguars	22–13	Loosehead prop		27 Oct 1984	Newlands, Cape Town
3.	New Zealand Cavaliers	21–15	Loosehead prop		10 May 1986	Newlands, Cape Town
4.	New Zealand Cavaliers	18–19	Loosehead prop		17 May 1986	Kings Park, Durban

== See also ==
- List of South Africa national rugby union players – Springbok no. 538
