= Anton Greyling =

South African footballer

Anton Greyling (born 12 May 1977 in Pretoria) is a South African professional footballer. He has won ten caps for South Africa at Under-23 level and currently plays for Bidvest Wits.

Greyling began his career in his native South Africa as an amateur with Arcadia Shepherds. He later played for Hellenic and Supersport United before moving to England in 2001 where he had unsuccessful trials with AFC Bournemouth and Crystal Palace.

In July 2001 he joined Torquay United.

He returned to Supersports United, managed by Bruce Grobbelaar, joining Wits in 2003.

== External sources ==
- https://web.archive.org/web/20060924173155/http://www.witsfc.co.za/wits07/pages/profiles.asp?Name=Greyling
