= Anton Shenfeld =

Russian ice hockey player

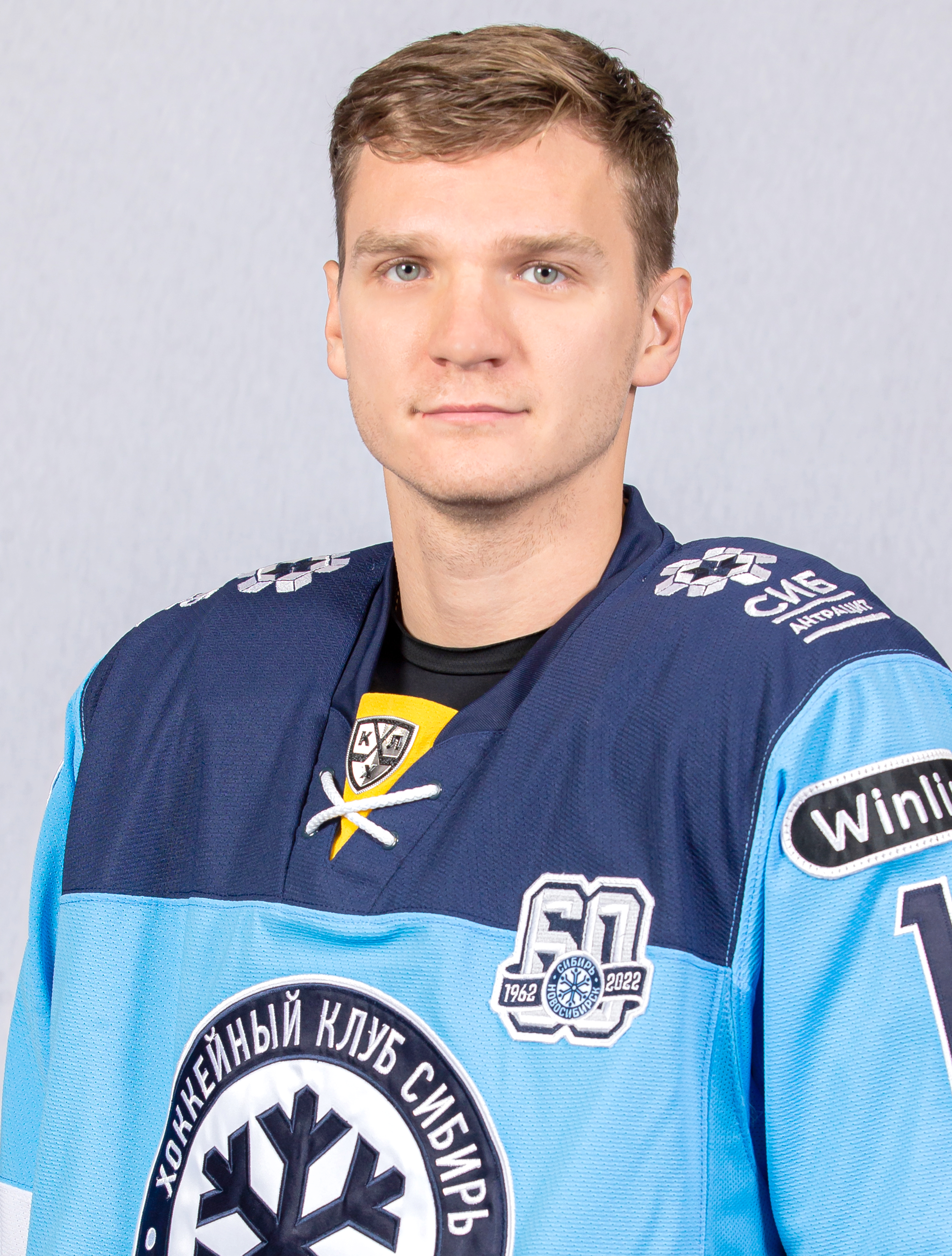
- Born: July 23, 1993 (age 31); Magnitogorsk, Russia
- Height: 5 ft 10 in (178 cm)
- Weight: 157 lb (71 kg; 11 st 3 lb)
- Position: Forward
- Shoots: Left
- VHL team Former teams: Molot Perm; Metallurg Magnitogorsk; Lada Togliatti; Torpedo Nizhny Novgorod; Sibir Novosibirsk; Kunlun Red Star
- Playing career: 2012–present

Anton Yevgenevich Shenfeld (Шенфельд Антон Евгеньевич, born July 23, 1993) is a Russian professional ice hockey player. He is currently playing with Molot Perm of the Supreme Hockey League (VHL).

== Playing career ==
Shenfeld made his Kontinental Hockey League (KHL) debut playing with Metallurg Magnitogorsk during the 2012–13 KHL season.

After helping contribute to Metallurg claiming the Gagarin Cup in 2014, Shenfeld was traded in order for more opportunity to HC Lada Togliatti on July 4, 2014. He played in three seasons with Lada before returning to Magnitogorsk.

With the 2023–24 season underway, Shenfeld resumed his professional career in the KHL by agreeing to a one-year contract with Chinese club, Kunlun Red Star, on 22 September 2023.
