= Anton Moeliono =

Indonesian linguist and grammarian (1929–2011)

Anton Moedardo Moeliono (21 February 1929 in Bandung – 25 July 2011 in Jakarta) was an Indonesian linguist. He is notable for his contribution into codification of the Indonesian language and orthography, and also in the field of Indonesian terminology.

In 1958, he completed his undergraduate studies at the Faculty of Literature of the University of Indonesia. In 1965, he obtained his master's degree in general linguistics at Cornell University. In 1971, he undertook postgraduate studies at the University of Leiden. He obtained his doctorate in 1981 at the University of Indonesia. Since 1982, he was a professor there.

== Selected bibliography ==
- Fonologi Bahasa Nias Utara (1958)
- On Grammatical Categories in Indonesian (1964)
- Edjaan Baru Bahasa Indonesia (1967)
- Bahasa Indonesia dan Pembakuannya: Suatu Tinjauan Linguistik (1969)
- Ciri-Ciri Bahasa Indonesia yang Baku (1976)
- Santun Bahasa (1984)
- Peranan Bahasa Pembangunan (1988)
- Pedoman Pengembangan Istilah (1988)
