= Anton Peterlin =

Anton Peterlin may refer to:

- Anton Peterlin (physicist) (1908–1993), Slovene physicist
- Anton Peterlin (soccer) (born 1987), American soccer player
