= Anton Führer =

German classicist (1854–1929)

- Born: September 30, 1854
- Died: July 20, 1929 (aged 74)
- Occupations: classicist, school principal, historian, textbook author
- Spouses: Helene Busch; Therese Becker
- Children: 8

Academic background
- Education: University of Göttingen
- Thesis: 'De dialecto Boeotica' (1876)

Anton Führer (30 September 1854 – 20 July 1929). was a German classicist who specialised in the language of Boeotia in Ancient Greece. He completed his dissertation De dialecto Boeotica at the University of Göttingen in 1876. As noted by Harry Falk (Indologist), he is not to be confused with Alois Anton Führer, the Indologist who studied Sanskrit at the University of Würzburg and had a controversial career in India. He was named an honorary citizen of the city of Rheine, and wrote a book about the city's history.

== Personal life ==
Führer married Helene Busch (died in 1907) in Neuss in 1887 and in 1907 married Therese Becker. He was a father of eight, three of his sons died in World War I.

== Works ==
- Geschichte der Stadt Rheine. Von den ältesten Zeiten bis zur Gegenwart. A. Rieke Nachf., Rheine 1927 (Neuauflage 1974, Verlag der Buchhandlung Eckers)
- Kurze Geschichte der Stadt Rheine. Aschendorff, Münster 1917
- Geschichte des Gymnasiums Dionysianum in Rheine. A. Rieke, Rheine 1909

=== Works listed in the DNB ===
1. Geschichte der Stadt Rheine Führer, Anton. - Rheine : Eckers, 1974, 2. Aufl.
2. Geschichte der Stadt Rheine Führer, Anton. - Rheine i. W. : A. Rieke Nachf., 1927
3. Abriss der deutschen Grammatik Führer, Anton. - Münster i. W. : Aschendorff, 1918, 3. Aufl.
4. Kurze Geschichte der Stadt Rheine Führer, Anton. - Rheine : Aschendorff, Münster i. W., 1917
5. Sprachgeschichtliche Erläuterungen zur lateinischen Formen- u. Lautlehre Führer, Anton. - Paderb. : Schöningh, 1917
6. Sprachwissenschaft und lateinische Schulgrammatik Führer, Anton. - Paderborn : Schöningh, 1917
7. Geschichte des Gymnasiums Dionysianum in Rheine Führer, Anton. - Rheine : A. Rieke, 1909
8. Deutsches Lesebuch für die unteren und mittleren Klassen höherer LehranstaltencFührer, Anton. - Münster : Aschendorff
9. Uebungsstoff für ... des lateinischen Unterrichts Führer, Anton. - Paderborn : Schöningh
10. Übungsstoff für die Mittelstufe des lateinischen Unterrichts Führer, Anton. - Paderborn : F. Schöningh
11. Übungsstoffe für den lateinischen Unterricht Schultz, Ferdinand. - Paderborn : Ferd. Schöningh
12. Vorschule für den ersten Unterricht im Lateinischen Führer, Anton. - Paderborn : Schöningh
