= Anton Fedorin =

Estonian judoka

Anton Fedorin (2 July 1978 – 15 July 2012) was a Russian-born Estonian judoka and wrestler.

He was born in Leningrad and studied at the St. Petersburg Institute of Economics and Finance.

He began his martial arts career in at the age of 10, coached by Juri Kuklev and his father. In 1997, he won junior championships in sambo. In 1999, he won European U-18 championships in sambo. He was multiple-times Estonian champion in judo.

He died on 15 July 2012 after motorcycle accident.
