= Anton Wolf =

Austrian footballer (1933–2010)

Personal information
- Date of birth: 21 April 1933
- Date of death: 22 September 2010 (aged 77)
- Position: Midfielder

International career
Years	Team	Apps	(Gls)
- Austria

Anton Wolf (21 April 1933 – 22 September 2010) was an Austrian footballer. He competed in the men's tournament at the 1952 Summer Olympics.
