= Anton Eberst =

Serbian clarinetist

Background information
- Born: 27 April 1920; Vršac, Kingdom of Serbs, Croats and Slovenes
- Died: 19 February 2005 (aged 84) Novi Sad, Serbia and Montenegro
- Instrument: clarinet

Anton Eberst (27 April 1920 – 19 February 2005), a former student of Bruno Brun, was a Serbian clarinetist, clarinet teacher and founder of the Wind Department at the Isidor Bajić School of Music in Novi Sad and author of numerous textbooks and articles about the wind instruments.
