= Anton Endstorfer =

Austrian sculptor

- Born: 15 July 1880; Vienna, Austria-Hungary
- Died: 2 September 1961 (aged 81); Vienna, Austria
- Occupation: Sculptor

Anton Endstorfer (15 July 1880 – 2 September 1961) was an Austrian sculptor. His work was part of the sculpture event in the art competition at the 1932 Summer Olympics.
