= Anton Sommerseth =

Norwegian politician

Anton Sommerseth (15 December 1909 – 25 December 1998) was a Norwegian politician for the Liberal Party.

He served as a deputy representative to the Norwegian Parliament from Troms during the terms 1958–1961, 1961–1965 and 1965–1969.
