= Anton Olsen =

Anton Olsen, Olsen or Olsson may refer to:

- Anton Olsen (Medal of Honor) (1873–1924), United States Navy quartermaster who received the Medal of Honor
- Anton Olsen (rifle shooter) (1897–1968), Norwegian rifle shooter
- Anton Olson (1881–?), Swedish chess master
- Anton Olsson, character in the 1973 film Anton
