= Antoine =

- Pronunciation: French: [ɑ̃twan]
- Gender: Male
- Language: French, from Latin

Origin
- Meaning: beyond praise, highly praiseworthy

Other names
- Alternative spelling: Antjuan, Antoan, Antoin, Antowain, Antuan, Antwaan, Antwan, Antwaun, Antwon, Anton, Antwoine, Antwone, Antwuan
- Variant forms: Danton, Titouan, Antonin, D'Anton
- Pet names: Toine, Twan, Titou
- Cognate: Antoinette
- Anglicisation: Anthony
- See also: Antonious

Antoine is a French given name (from the Latin Antonius meaning 'highly praise-worthy') that is a variant of Danton, Titouan, D'Anton, and Antonin.

The name is most common in France, Switzerland, Belgium, Canada, West Greenland, Haiti, French Guiana, Madagascar, Benin, Niger, Burkina Faso, Ivory Coast, Guinea, Senegal, Mauritania, Western Sahara, Morocco, Algeria, Tunisia, Chad, Central African Republic, Cameroon, Equatorial Guinea, Gabon, Republic of the Congo, Democratic Republic of the Congo, Burundi, and Rwanda.

It is a cognate of the masculine given name Anthony. Similar names include Antaine, Anthoine, Antoan, Antoin, Antton, Antuan, Antwain, Antwan, Antwaun, Antwoine, Antwone, Antwon and Antwuan.

Feminine forms include Antonia, Antoinette, and (more rarely) Antionette.

== As a first name ==
- Antoine Alexandre Barbier (1765–1825), a French librarian and bibliographer
- Antoine Arbogast (1759–1803), a French mathematician
- Antoine Arnauld (1612–1694), a French theologian, philosopher and mathematician
- Antoine Ashley (1984–2012), American drag queen also known as Sahara Davenport
- Antoine Audet (1846–1915), a Member of the House of Commons of Canada
- Antoine, bastard of Burgundy (1421–1504), bastard son of Philip III, also known as Philip the Good
- Antoine Baumé (1728–1804), a French chemist
- Antoine Béchamp (1816–1908), a French biologist
- Antoine Bertier (1761–1854), a French landowner and politician
- Antoine Bethea (born 1984), an American football player
- Antoine Bibesco (1878–1951), a Romanian prince, aristocrat, lawyer, diplomat and writer
- Antoine Mac Giolla Bhrighde (1957–1984), an IRA terrorist killed by the SAS in 1984
- Antoine Brooks (born 1997), American football player
- Antoine Busnois (1430–1492), a French composer and poet
- Antoine Caldwell (born 1986), an American football player
- Antoine Carr (born 1961), a former American basketball player
- Antoine Carraby (born 1967), stage name DJ Yella, member of N.W.A
- Antoine Cason (born 1986), an American football player
- Antoine Clamaran (born 1964), a French DJ
- Antoine Coupland, (born 2003), Canadian soccer player
- Antoine de Caunes (born 1953), French television presenter, actor, writer, and film director
- Antoine de Jussieu (1686–1758), a French botanist
- Antoine de Lhoyer (1768–1852), a French virtuoso guitarist and composer
- Antoine Dénériaz (born 1976), French alpine skier
- Antoine Deparcieux (1703–1768), a French mathematician
- Antoine de Saint-Exupéry,(1900–1944), French aviator and writer
- Antoine Dodson,(born 1986), American interviewee turned internet celebrity
- Antoine Domino (1928–2017), American singer and pianist, better known as 'Fats Domino'
- Antoine Drouot (1774–1844), French officer who fought in the French Revolutionary Wars and Napoleonic Wars
- Antoine Dubé (born 1947), member of the Canadian House of Commons
- Antoine Dufour (born 1979), a French-Canadian acoustic guitarist
- Antoine François Desrues (1744–1777), French poisoner
- Antoine Étex (1808–1888), French sculptor, painter, and architect
- Antoine Fauchery (1823–1861), French adventurer, writer and photographer
- Antoine Fuqua (born 1966), an American film director
- Antoine Furetière,(1619–1688), French scholar
- Antoine Galland (1646–1715), French orientalist and archaeologist
- Antoine Ghanem (1943–2007), Lebanese politician
- Antoine Gizenga (1925–2019), Congolese politician
- Antoine Godeau (1605–1672), French bishop
- Antoine Gomis (born 1989), French basketball player
- Antoine Green (born 1999), American football player
- Antoine Griezmann (born 1991), French football player
- Antoine Héroet (1492–1568), French poet
- Antoine Izméry, (?-1993), Haitian businessman
- Antoine Rizkallah Kanaan Filho (born 1974), Brazilian racing driver
- Antoine Karam (French Guianan politician) (born 1950)
- Antoine Karam (Lebanese politician) (born 1956)
- Antoine Konrad (born 1975), Swiss DJ
- Antoine Lahad (1927–2015), Lebanese Army Major General, and subsequently leader of the South Lebanon Army
- Antoine Lavoisier (1743–1794), French nobleman and chemist, known for identifying oxygen and hydrogen
- Antoine Léaument (born 1989), French politician
- Antoine Adolphe Marcelin Marbot (1781–1844), French general who fought in the Napoleonic Wars
- Antoine François Marmontel (1816–1898), French pianist, teacher and musicographer
- Antoine McColister (born 1988), American rapper known professionally as Ace Hood
- Antoine Merriweather, a character portrayed by David Alan Grier in the In Living Color sketch "Men on Film"
- Antoine Parent (1666–1716), French mathematician
- Antoine Pinto (born 1991), French Muay Thai kickboxing
- Antoine Praud (born 2003), French para-athlete
- Antoine Pruneau (born 1989), Canadian gridiron football player
- Antoine de Rochebrune (born 1964), French Roman Catholic priest
- Antoine Sakr, Lebanese football player
- Antoine Semenyo, Ghanaian football player
- Antoine Schouten (born 1946), Canadian field hockey player
- Antoine Sibierski (born 1974), French former footballer
- Antoine Sonrel (1804–1879), French engraver, illustrator and photographer
- Antoine Claire Thibaudeau (1765–1854), a French politician
- Antoine Vermorel-Marques (born 1993), French politician
- Antoine Walker (born 1976), American basketball player
- Antoine Wesley (born 1997), American football player
- Antoine Winfield (born 1977), American football player
- Antoine Winfield Jr. (born 1998), American football player, son of Antoine Winfield
- Antoine-Aimé Dorion (1818–1891), French-Canadian politician and jurist
- Antoine-Denis Chaudet (1763–1810), a French sculptor
- Antoine-Jean Gros (1771–1835), a French female painter
- Antoine-Marin Lemierre (1733–1793), a French dramatist and poet

== As a family name ==
- Éric Antoine (born 1976), French comedy magician
- Guacolda Antoine Lazzerini (1908–2015), Chilean mathematician
- Louis-Joseph Antoine (1846–1912), Walloon religions leader, founder of Antoinism
- Louis Antoine (1888–1971), French mathematician
- André Antoine (1858–1943), French actor and director, founder of the Théâtre Libre
- Jonathan Antoine (born 1995), English classical opera singer
- Josephine Antoine (1907–1971), American coloratura soprano
- Vinessa Antoine (born 1983), Canadian actress
- Zenarae Antoine (born 1975), American basketball coach

== As a mononym ==
- Antoine (born 1944), French musician and sailor
- Antoine de Paris (1884–1976), Polish celebrity hairdresser

== See also ==
- Antawn Jamison
- Antjuan Tobias
- Antowain Smith
- Antwaan Randle El
- DeAntoine Beasley
- Jean-Antoine
