= Antun =

Antun (pronounced [ǎntuːn]) is a masculine given name used in Croatia and among people of Croatian descent elsewhere. It is a common given name, cognate to the name Anthony. Other such Croatian names include Ante, Anton and Toni.

Antun is also a surname found in Syria.

== Given name ==
- Antun Augustinčić (1900–1979), Croatian sculptor
- Antun Karlo Bakotić (1831–1887), Croatian writer and physicist
- Antun Banek (1901–1987), Yugoslav cyclist
- Antun Barac (1894–1955), Croatian historian
- Antun Bauer (archbishop) (1856–1937), Croatian theologian, philosopher and Archbishop
- Antun Bauer (museologist) (1911–2000), Croatian museologist and collector
- Antun Belglava (1730–1790), Roman Catholic bishop
- Antun Petar Bezjak, birthname of Zvonko Bezjak (1935–2022), Croatian hammer thrower
- Antun Blažić (1916–1943), Croatian resistance fighter
- Antun Bogetić (1922–2017), Croatian Prelate
- Antun Bonifačić (1901–1986), Croatian fascist politician
- Anton Cerer (1916–2006), Slovenian swimmer
- Antun Dalmatin (fl. 16th century), Croatian translator and publisher
- Antun Dobronić (1878–1955), Croatian composer
- Antun Dunković (born 1981), Croatian footballer
- Antun Fabris (1864–1904), Croatian writer, publisher and politician
- Antun Fischer (1911–1985), Serbian wrestler
- Antun Giuriceo (1778–1842), Croatian religious figure
- Antun Grego (born 1940), Croatian sailor
- Antun Herceg (1927–2013), Serbian footballer
- Antun Ivanković (born 1939), Croatian rower
- Antun Kanižlić (1699–1777), Croatian Jesuit and poet
- Antun Pasko Kazali (1815–1894), Croatian folk-writer, poet and translator
- Antun Knežević (1834–1889), Bosnian Franciscan friar
- Antun Korlević (1851–1915), Croatian entomologist
- Antun Korošec (1872–1940), Yugoslav politician
- Antun Kovacic (born 1981), Australian footballer
- Antun Kropivšek (1925–2013), Croatian gymnast
- Antun Kukuljević Sakcinski (1776–1851), Croatian politician
- Antun Labak (born 1970), Croatian footballer
- Antun Lokošek (1920–1994), Croatian footballer
- Antun Lović, birthname of Toni Lović (born 1967), Croatian guitarist and record producer
- Antun Lučić, birthname of Anthony Francis Lucas (1855–1921), Croatian-born oil explorer
- Anton Mahnič (1850–1920), Croatian-Slovenian prelate of the Catholic Church
- Antun Maqdisi (1914–2005), Syrian politician
- Antun Marković (born 1992), Croatian footballer
- Antun Gustav Matoš (1873–1914) Croatian writer
- Antun Mavrak (1899–1938), Croatian revolutionary
- Antun Mažuranić (1805–1888), Croatian writer and linguist
- Antun Mihalović (1868–1949), Croatian politician
- Antun Mihanović (1796–1861), Croatian poet and lyricist
- Antun Miletić (born 1931), Croatian historian
- Antun Motika (1902–1992), Croatian artist
- Antun Najžer, Croatian medical doctor and war criminal
- Antun Nalis, also known as Tonči Nalis, (1911–2000), Croatian actor
- Antun Nardelli, full name of Ante Nardelli (1937–1995), Croatian water polo player
- Antun Nemčić (1813–1849), Croatian writer
- Antun Palić (born 1988), Croatian footballer
- Antun Pejačević (1749–1802), Croatian Austrian nobleman
- Antun Pogačnik, also known as Toni Pogačnik, (1913–1978), Croatian footballer
- Antun Radić (1868–1919), Croatian politician
- Antun Rudinski (1937–2017), Serbian footballer and football manager
- Antun Branko Šimić (1898–1925), Croatian poet
- Antun Škvorčević (born 1947), Croatian bishop
- Antun Šoljan (1932–1993), Croatian writer
- Antun Sorkočević (1775–1841), Croatian writer, composer
- Antun Stipančić, also known as Tova Stipančić, (1949–1991), Yugoslav table tennis player
- Antun Nikolić Tuca (born 1943), Croatian musician
- Anton Tus (1931–2023), Croatian general
- Antun Vakanović (1808–1894), Croatian politician
- Antun Vramec (1538–1587/8), Slovene priest and writer
- Antun Vrančić, also known as Antonio Veranzio, (1504–1573), Croatian prelate
- Antun Vrdoljak (born 1931), Croatian actor, screenwriter and politician
- Antun Vujić (born 1945), Croatian politician

== Middle name ==
- Ambroz Antun Kapić (1529–1598), Croatian Franciscan priest
- Federico Antún Batlle (born 1952), Dominican politician
- Franjo Antun Brtučević, birthname of Francesco Antonio Bertucci (fl. 1595), Croatian friar
- Ivan Antun Zrinski (1654–1703), Croatian count
- Matija Antun Relković (1732–1798), Croatian military officer and writer

== Surname ==
- Farah Antun (1874–1922), Lebanese Christian

== See also ==
- Antoun
- Antuan
- Antuna
