= Alzire =

Play by Voltaire

Alzire, ou les Américains (Alzire, or The Americans) is a five-act tragedy in verse, written by Voltaire in 1733 and 1734 and premièred on January 27, 1736 at the Comédie-Française in Paris.

Set in Lima, Peru, shortly after the Spanish Conquest, Alzire addresses themes of religion, colonization, and slavery within the context of a love triangle. The Inca king Montèze persuades his daughter Alzire to become a Christian and to marry Don Gusman, the brutal Spanish Governor of Peru. However, Alzire still mourns her lover Zamore, who is believed to have been killed by the Spanish. When Zamore reappears, bent on revenge, Alzire is torn between her love for him and her duty to her new husband, her people, and her religion. Zamore kills Gusman who, with his dying breath, forgives Zamore and renounces Alzire.

The first French tragedy with a specifically Inca setting, Alzire expanded on the fashion of American exoticism. Numerous performances, translations, and adaptations ensured that Alzire remained one of Voltaire’s most popular plays well into the 19th century.

== Characters ==
- Don Gusman, Governor of Peru
- Don Alvarès, Gusman’s father and the former Governor
- Zamore, Sovereign of a part of Potoze (Potosí) (Note: Ficek notes that the names of Voltaire’s characters demonstrate the conflation of different parts, cultures and histories of America. Potoze is a Frenchified version of Potosí, the Andean mining city that produced most of the silver exported to Spain.)
- Montèze, Sovereign of another part of Peru (Note: Another example of Voltaire’s conflation of cultures and histories of America. Montèze is an adaptation of Montezuma, the Aztec ruler.)
- Alzire, Daughter of Montèze
- Émire and Céphale, Alzire’s attendants
- Spanish Officers
- Americans (i.e., Incas)

== Synopsis ==
The action takes place in Los Reyes (Lima) after the Spanish conquest of the Inca Empire during the 1530s.

=== Act 1 ===
The elderly governor Alvarès hands over the governorship of Peru to his son Gusman. Expressing regret for Spain’s barbaric treatment of the Incas (who are called Americans throughout the play), Alvarès urges Gusman to exercise his power with Christian mercy and to free the American slaves being held in the palace. Recalling that his own life was once saved by an American, Alvarès reminds his son that cruelty is not the way to win the love of the Inca princess Alzire.

Gusman argues that only severity will prevent the natives from revolting, but agrees to free the Inca slaves on condition that they become Christians. He also asks his father to persuade Alzire’s father Montèze to command her to marry him.

Alvarès assures Gusman that both Alzire and Montèze have agreed to become Christians and that Alzire will marry Gusman, ensuring peace between the two nations. Alzire makes it clear to her father and to the jealous Gusman that she is agreeing to the marriage only for the sake of her country; she still grieves for her lover Zamore, who disappeared three years earlier and is believed to have been killed in combat.

=== Act 2 ===
It turns out that one of the imprisoned Incas is Zamore; he and his comrades are bent on revenge against Gusman, who deprived him of his kingdom and his beloved Alzire and destroyed the temples of his gods.

When Alvarès comes to free the prisoners, Zamore recognizes him as the Spaniard whose life he had saved. The two greet each other with affection and respect. Zamore rejoices at the prospect of once again seeing Montèze and Alzire, and hopes that Alvarès’ son is as just and virtuous as his father.

Zamore is reunited with Montèze, who reveals that he is now a Christian and insists that it is futile to resist the Spaniards. Zamore is shocked that Montèze has capitulated to the conquerors and to their God, but he does not yet realize that the hated Gusman is Alvarès’ son and Alzire’s new husband.

=== Act 3 ===
Zamore seeks a meeting with Alzire, where he learns that she has married Gusman. They are interrupted by Alvarès and Gusman; Alvarès introduces Zamore – the man to whom he owes his life – to Gusman, and is astounded when Zamore accuses Gusman of tyranny and vows vengeance. Alzire reiterates that she loves Zamore but as she is bound by her marriage vow, she can be with neither man. She tells Gusman that as he already has blood on his hands, he may as well kill her too. As Alvarès pleads with Gusman to show mercy, a Spanish officer announces that armed Americans are at the city gates. Gusman orders the guards to take Zamore away.

=== Act 4 ===
Gusman’s forces triumph over the Americans. Alvarès asks his son to pardon Zamore, but Gusman retorts that he cannot do so when he knows that Alzire loves his enemy. Still, he agrees to delay Zamore’s punishment until after Alvarès can talk with Alzire.

Alzire pleads with Gusman, hinting that mercy would win her respect and possibly soften her heart. He dismisses her tersely, telling her not to speak the name of his rival, but to wait in humble silence for his decision. Alzire and her servant Emira arrange to bribe a guard so that Zamore can escape. When Zamore asks Alzire to come with him, she tells him she loves him, but cannot break her marriage vow. Accusing her of betraying him, Zamore leaves.

Alzire sends Emira after Zamore to be sure he gets safely away. A clamour ensues, and Emira returns to say Zamore has rushed toward Gusman’s palace and is in dire peril. Guards arrive to arrest Alzire.

=== Act 5 ===
Montèze tells Alzire that Zamore, disguised as an armed soldier, has stabbed Gusman and surrendered to Alvarès. Alzire and Zamore await the sentence of death from Alvarès, who is distraught at losing his son, as well as Zamore, to whom he owes his life, and Alzire, his new daughter. He tells Zamore that if he becomes a Christian he can be forgiven and both he and Alzire will live. Zamore asks Alzire to help him make the honourable choice. Admitting that it was a mistake for her to obey her father and accept the Christian faith, she tells Zamore that to renounce the gods one worships in one's heart is the crime of a coward. Zamore agrees that it is better to die than to dishonour himself.

The dying Gusman is brought in. He announces that his life cannot pay for the blood he has shed, but that by pardoning Zamore and Alzire, he will show them how a true Christian behaves. He tells Zamore, “Observe the difference between your gods and mine: yours teach you murder and revenge. And mine orders me to pity you and to forgive you.” He entrusts Alzire to Zamore and tells Alvarès to be a father to the happy couple.

As Gusman dies, Zamor and Alzire fall at his feet, expressing awe at the power of Christian virtue.

== Composition and Background ==
Following the success of his 1732 tragedy Zaïre, set in 13th century Jerusalem, Voltaire turned to another exotic setting – 16th century Peru – for his next play, Alzire.

He probably began work on Alzire in late 1733 in Paris. The following year he fled Paris to avoid arrest after the publication in France of his Lettres philosophiques (Letters on the English) – a work that came out of his exile in England from 1726 to 1728. Voltaire’s praise of English politics, religion, and culture was seen as an implicit attack on French government and culture, as well as on the Catholic Church. Critic Gustave Lanson described Voltaire's Lettres as “the first bomb aimed at the ancien régime, and the government reacted accordingly, confiscating the edition, arresting the printer, and issuing a lettre de cachet ordering Voltaire’s arrest and a public book burning. Voltaire fled into internal exile, taking refuge at the Château de Cirey, the country house of his companion Émilie du Châtelet. Here he completed the first draft of Alzire.

Revisions proceeded through 1734 and 1735, as Voltaire shared and discussed the play with his friends Charles-Augustin de Ferriol d'Argental and Nicolas-Claude Thieriot, as well as Mme du Châtelet.

Voltaire’s correspondence makes clear that he hoped Alzire would return him to the good graces of the government and censors following the uproar caused by publication of the Lettres philosophiques. In November 1734, he wrote to Argental that his new play was une pièce fort chrétienne qui poura me réconcilier avec quelques dévots (a very Christian play that may reconcile me with a few devout souls).

A letter to Argental the following month reiterated his hopes that his new tragedy would reconcile him with the authorities:

Si elle n’a pas l’air d’être l’ouvrage d’un bon poète, elle aura celui d’être au moins d’un bon chrétien, et par le temps qui court, il vaut mieux faire sa cour à la religion qu’à la poésie.

If it does not seem to be the work of a good poet, it will at least appear to be that of a good Christian, and in these times, it is better to curry favor with religion than with poetry.

Voltaire revealed more about his purpose in writing the play in the first part of his preface (“Discours préliminaire”) to Alzire:

An effort has been made in this tragedy, which is entirely born of the imagination and is of rather a new kind, to discover to what extent the true spirit of religion is superior to the natural virtues.

The religion of a barbarian is to offer to his gods the blood of his enemies. An ignorant Christian is often no better. To be assiduous in certain useless practices, and to ignore the true duty of a man; to pray, but to keep one’s vices; to fast, but to hate; to conspire, to persecute, such is his religion. That of the true Christian is to consider all men as his brothers, to do good and to forgive evil. Such is Gusman at the hour of his death, such is Alvarès during the whole course of his life. ...

This humanity, which should be the chief characteristic of every thinking being, will be found in nearly all my writings. They show ... a wish for the happiness of mankind, a horror of injustice and oppression.

Even after Alzire’s première in 1736, Voltaire continued to rework the play, sending revisions to Argental and Thieriot, as well as to the Comédie-Française actors, whose performances he critiqued.

Voltaire dedicated Alzire to Émilie du Châtelet with a lengthy dedicatory epistle in which he emphasized her scientific interests and knowledge and asserted the right of women to pursue scholarly interests.

Madame, le plus grand génie, et sûrement le plus désirable, est celui qui ne donne l’exclusion à aucun des beaux-arts. ... Heureux l’esprit que la philosophie ne peut dessécher, et que les charmes des belles-lettres ne peuvent amollir ; qui sait se fortifier avec Locke, s’éclairer avec Clarke et Newton, s’élever dans la lecture de Cicéron et de Bossuet, s’embellir par les charmes de Virgile et du Tasse!
Tel est votre génie, madame.

Madame, the greatest genius, and surely the most desirable, is the one that gives exclusion to none of the fine arts. ... Happy is the mind that philosophy cannot dry up, and that the charms of belles-lettres cannot soften; that knows how to fortify itself with Locke, enlighten itself with Clarke and Newton, elevate itself by reading Cicero and Bossuet, beautify itself by the charms of Virgil and Tasso!
Such is your genius, madam.

Voltaire also referred to her collaboration in the creation and revision of the play:

Je l’ai composée dans votre maison et sous vos yeux ... Vous avez ôté bien des défauts à cet ouvrage, vous connaissez ceux qui le défigurent encore.

I composed it in your house and before your eyes. ... You have removed many faults from this work, you know those that still disfigure it.

=== Sources and Inspiration ===
Although Voltaire stated in the preface to Alzire that the story was his own invention, details in the play, as well as his own footnotes, demonstrate his knowledge of the Spanish Conquest and of Incan history and civilization.

His knowledge was gleaned in large part from historical sources that included Historia del descubrimiento y conquista del Perú (History of the discovery and conquest of Peru) by Agustín de Zárate; Comentarios Reales de los Incas (The Royal Commentaries of the Incas) by Inca Garcilaso de La Vega; and the writings of the 16th-century Dominican priest Bartolomé de las Casas.

These historical works, along with travel accounts by explorers and scientists in the 16th and 17th centuries resonated widely among “armchair explorers” and encouraged a growing trend in American exoticism through fiction, drama, and art.

Voltaire’s inspirations for Alzire probably also included works by John Dryden and Jean-Philippe Rameau that figured prominently in this fashion for American exoticism.

Voltaire had become interested in Dryden during his exile in England. The 17th century English playwright had set two of his tragedies in the Americas. The Indian Queen was co-written with Dryden’s brother-in-law Robert Howard and first performed in 1664. It featured the Aztec emperor Montezuma in a fictional pre-conquest conflict between Mexico and Peru.

Montezuma reappears in Dryden’s sequel to The Indian Queen – The Indian Emperour, or the Conquest of Mexico by the Spaniards (first performed in 1665, published in 1667) — which deals with the conquest of the Aztec Empire under Hernán Cortés.

Voltaire knew The Indian Emperour well; he quoted lines from it in his notebooks, and the resemblance between the two plays is striking. The Indian Emperour depicts a moment in the conquest of Mexico, Alzire an episode in the conquest of Peru. Both plays use heroic romance material to express their authors’ philosophical ideas; both plays contrast two civilizations and two religions, demonstrating that the Christian conquerors are capable of barbarism, the pagans capable of honour.

Alzire may also have been inspired in part by Les Indes galantes, a popular opera-ballet by Jean-Philippe Rameau with a libretto by Louis Fuzelier, which was first performed in Paris in 1735. Les Indes galantes incorporated an earlier work by Rameau, a harpsichord piece called Les Sauvages, which was itself inspired by the performance of two Indigenous men from Louisiana who danced at the Théâtre Italian in Paris in 1725.

Les Indes galantes comprises a prologue and four acts, each with a brief love story set in an exotic place – Turkey, Peru, Persia, and North America. The second act, “Les Incas du Pérou” (“The Incas of Peru”) features a love triangle involving an Inca princess, a Spanish officer, and an Inca high priest. Les Indes galantes was the first important work to bring the Incas to the Paris stage. Alzire in turn was the first French tragedy with a specifically Inca setting.

== Performance History ==
Two days before its première, Alzire was staged in a private performance at the Château de Cirey, possibly with Voltaire in the role of Alvarez. The first public performance took place January 27, 1736, at the Comédie-Française before 1367 spectators. The production ran for 20 performances and was the best-attended play of the 1735-36 season.

Alzire went on to become one of Voltaire’s most popular plays. By 1830 it had been performed 328 times at the Comédie-Française. Performances also took place at the court of Versailles, including a performance in February 1750 with the role of Alzire played by Madame de Pompadour.

Two other performance venues provided a striking demonstration of the popularity of Alzire and of American exoticism, while also highlighting the dichotomy between Alzire’s themes of sympathy for the colonized and enslaved Incas in 16th century Peru and the elision of those same themes in the context of 18th century French colonialism and the slave trade.

In the summer of 1766 the crew of the slave-trading vessel the Comte d'Hérouville put on a performance of Alzire on the ship’s deck as it was anchored off Gorée Island opposite Dakar in Senegal. In the hold were hundreds of African slaves destined for the Caribbean.

Joseph Mosneron, a sailor on the Comte d'Hérouville, member of a prosperous family of slave traders, and eventually an armateur (shipowner) of slave-trading vessels himself, initiated and produced the performance. Mosneron's memoirs record the event, but show no recognition of the irony that a play criticizing colonialism was being performed on a ship engaged in the slave trade.

The first time in my life that I saw live theater, it was in Africa. Alzire was performed, and my very uninitiated eyes were very pleased by this spectacle, in which all the roles were filled by men. You have to be truly carried away by the illusion in order to go along with the sight of a grenadier dressed up as Alzire, declaiming in a booming voice and with the gestures of a vigorous Hercules the melodious verses of one of Voltaire’s masterpieces.

Alzire also found its way to the New World with a performance in Saint-Domingue in June of 1765, not long before the Comte d’Hérouville performance at Gorée. The play was performed at least six more times in Saint-Domingue between 1769 and 1782.

Saint-Domingue was the most profitable colony the world had ever known, its prosperity built on sugar plantations and the slave trade. In 1765 there were 200,000 slaves in Saint-Domingue. By 1789 the slave population was estimated at 500,000 to 600,000 people. At least as early as 1766, mulattoes and blacks in Saint-Domingue were allowed to attend theatre, sitting at the back. It is therefore certain that people of colour had the opportunity to hear and understand Alzire.

== Translations and Adaptations ==
=== Translations ===
Alzire was widely translated and adapted. Beginning in 1736, a free translation by playwright Aaron Hill was staged several times in London under the titles Alzira: A Tragedy and Alzira, Or Spanish insult repented. Hill’s version changed Gusman’s name to Don Carlos, and Montèze’s name to Ezmont.

Seven published translations are recorded in Italy up to 1797, along with two Dutch versions (1736/38), six German translations between 1738 and 1783, as well as translations into Russian (1762/86), Danish (1772), Swedish (1778), Polish (1780), Portuguese (1785/88), Spanish (1788) and Hungarian (1790).

=== Parodies ===
Within two months of its première on January 27, 1736, three parodies of Alzire had been created and staged in Paris.

On February 18, Alzirette was staged at the Théâtre de l’Opéra-Comique of the Foire Saint-Germain, an annual fair in Paris that took place around Easter. Written by Charles-François Panard, Claude-Florimond Boizard de Ponteau, and René Parmentier, Alzirette moves the action from Peru to a French village. The Spanish conquistadors become greedy poachers named Gourmande (Gusman) and Avalarès (Alvarès), who grow fat on all the food and drink they have plundered from the now emaciated Incas. The play maintains the love triangle between Alzirette (Alzire), Gourmande, and Maigrefort (Zamore).

The same fair also featured La Fille obéissante (The Obedient Girl), an anonymous parody performed in Nicolas Bienfait's marionette theatre; this parody moved the action to Mexico.

March 5, 1736 saw the première at the Comédie‑Italienne of Les Sauvages by Jean-Antoine Romagnesi and Antoine-François Riccoboni. This parody is set “in America,” but the precise location is a moving target. In the first scene Garnement (Gusman) inherits the governorship of the Missouri Indians; later, Matamore (Zamore) indicates that he rules Potosí (in Bolivia); later still he and his companion Négrillon state that they, as well as the palace guards, are speaking Iroquois.

=== Operas ===
Alzire also inspired multiple works for the operatic stage.

- Pizarre, ou La conquête de Pérou (Pizarro, or The Conquest of Peru) premiered in 1785 at the Paris Opera. It was composed by Pierre-Joseph Candeille, with a libretto by Pierre Duplessis. In this opera Gusman, governor of Peru, is replaced by Pizarre (Francisco Pizarro), the Spanish conqueror of the Inca Empire.
- In 1794, Alzira, an opera composed by Niccolò Antonio Zingarelli, premiered in Florence. The librettist, unnamed, may have been Gaetano Rossi or G. Gavaerta or Cavaerta
- Zingarelli and Sebastiano Nasolini composed a revised version of Alzira, which was staged in Bologna in 1797. The librettist is thought to be Gaetano Rossi.
- Rossi’s libretto was also the basis for Alzira by Giuseppe Nicolini, first staged in 1797 in Genoa
- Another Alzira, with music by Francesco Bianchi and libretto by Serafino Buonaiuti, was performed in 1801 at the King’s Theatre in the Haymarket, London.
- Gaetano Rossi was also the librettist for Gli Americani (The Americans), an opera by Giovanni Simone Mayr that premiered in 1806 at La Fenice in Venice. Here the heroine is named Idalide, which is the opera’s original title. (Note: From Puchner, p. 518: Im darauffolgenden Jahr [1806] wurde in La Fenice "Gli americani" von Gaetano Rossi in der Musik von Simon Mayr gespielt. Anfänglich hieß das Werk "Idalide” und war eine Bearbeitung der “Alzira ou Les Américains” von Voltaire (1736), angepaßt an die aktuelle politische Lage in Venedig (spanische Eroberung – österreichische Eroberung). The following year [1806], “Gli americani” by Gaetano Rossi, with music by Simon Mayr, was performed at La Fenice. Originally titled “Idalide,” the work was an adaptation of Voltaire’s “Alzira ou Les Américains” (1736), adapted to the current political situation in Venice (Spanish conquest – Austrian conquest).)
- Rossi was again the librettist for an Alzira composed by Nicola Antonio Manfroce, which premiered in 1810 in Rome.
- Il trionfo di Gusmano (The Triumph of Gusmano), with music by Marcos António Portugal and libretto by Gaetano Rossi, saw its first performance at the Teatro de São Carlos in Lisbon in 1816.
- On August 12, 1845, Giuseppe Verdi’s eighth opera, Alzira, written to a libretto by Salvatore Cammarano, premiered at the Teatro San Carlo in Naples. In Verdi’s opera, Alzire’s father Montèze is renamed Ataliba, but the other main characters have names similar to those in Voltaire: Alvaro, Gusmano, Zamoro, and Alzira.

=== Film ===
Voltaire’s play makes an appearance in the 1978 film Alzire oder der neue Kontinent (Alzire or the New Continent), written by Dieter Feldhausen, directed by Thomas Koerfer, and starring François Simon as Voltaire.

The film depicts a theatre troupe in Switzerland trying to stage Alzire in commemoration of the 200th anniversary of Voltaire's death. As funding challenges and arguments threaten the project, Voltaire and Jean-Jacques Rousseau observe from the afterlife and debate the social role that art is meant to fulfill.

== Sources ==
- Besterman, Theodore (1969). Voltaire. New York: Harcourt, Brace & World.
- Ficek, Agnieszka A. (2023). From Allegory to Revolution: The Inca Empire in the Eighteenth-Century French Imagination. The Graduate Center, City University of New York: CUNY Academic Works.
- Miller, Christopher L. (2008). The French Atlantic Triangle: Literature and Culture of the Slave Trade. Liège: Duke University Press. ISBN 978-0-8223-8883-8.
- Pearson, Roger (2005). Voltaire Almighty: a Life in Pursuit of Freedom. New York and London: Bloomsbury Publishing. ISBN 978-1-58234-630-4.
- Poole, Deborah (1997). Vision, Race, and Modernity: A Visual Economy of the Andean Image World. Princeton University Press. ISBN 0-691-00645-8.
- Russell, Trusten Wheeler (1946). Voltaire, Dryden & Heroic Tragedy. New York: Columbia University Press.
- Smith, John Harrington (1954). "The Dryden-Howard Collaboration". Studies in Philology. 51 (1): 54–74.
- Winkler, Daniel (2015). "Alzire, ou Les Américains de Voltaire et le théâtre 'sensible' dans le contexte transeuropéen" [Voltaire's Alzire, ou les Americains and “Sensitive” Theater in a Trans-European Context]. Dalhousie French Studies. 106: 47–62.
