= Antuan =

Antuan is an African-American English given name associated with Antoine and Anthony. Notable people with this name include:

- Antuan Bronshtein, Russian convict
- Antuan Edwards (born 1977), American gridiron football player
- Antuan Ilgit (born 1972), Turkish-Italian Catholic Jesuit priest
- Antuan Mayorov (born 1971), Belarusian footballer
- Antuan Simmons (born 1979), American gridiron football player
- Antuan Siangboxing (born 1991), French Muay Thai kickboxer

== See also ==
- Antjuan Tobias
- Antman (disambiguation)
- Antoan, name
- Antun, name
- Antwan, name
- Antwuan, given name
- Anyuan (disambiguation)
