= Antuna =

Antuna or Antuña is a Spanish surname. Notable people with this name include the following:

- Abelardo Fernández Antuña (born 1970), also known simply as Abelardo, Spanish footballer
- Bladimir Antuna or José Bladimir Antuna Vázquez García (1970 – 2009), Mexican journalist
- Fidel Antuña Batista (born 1972), Mexican politician
- Graciano Antuña (1903 – 1937), Spanish politician
- Pablo Fernández Antuña (born 1979), known as Blin, Spanish footballer
- Raquel Peña de Antuña (born Raquel Peña Rodríguez; 1966), Dominican politician
- Raúl Antuña (born 1973), Argentine footballer
- Uriel Antuna or Carlos Uriel Antuna Romero (born 1997), Mexican footballer
- Yasel Antuna (born 1999) Dominican baseball player

== See also ==
- Estadio Hermanos Antuña
- Antona (name)
- Antun
