= Antwon (name) =

Antwon is an African-American English given name associated with Antoine and Anthony in use in the United States. Notable people with this name include the following people.

- Antwon, American hip hop recording artist
- Antwon Blake (born 1990), American football cornerback
- Antwon Burton (born 1983), American football defensive tackle
- Antwon Hicks (born 1983), American hurdling athlete
- Antwon Rose Jr. (died 2018), American shot by police
- Antwon Tanner (born 1975), American actor

== Fictional characters ==
- Antwon Mitchell, character in TV series The Shield
- Antwon "Skills" Taylor, character in TV series One Tree Hill

== See also ==
- Anthon (given name)
- Antwan
- Antoine
- Antoon
- Antwone
- Antxon, name
