= Antman =

Ant-Man, Ant Man, Antman or variation, may refer to:

== Marvel Comics topics ==
- Ant-Man, a Marvel Comics superhero
- Ant-Man (Marvel Cinematic Universe character), the film version of the Marvel Comics character
- Ant-Man (film), 2015 film based on the fictional superhero in the MCU
  - Ant-Man (soundtrack), 2015 film soundtrack album
- Ant-Man (TV series), 2017 animated U.S. DisneyXD TV show based on the Marvel character

== People ==
=== Nicknamed ===
- Mark Cruz (born 1992), Filipino basketball player nicknamed "Ant Man"
- E. O. Wilson (1929–2021), U.S. biologist nicknamed "Ant Man" for his studies with ants, being the foremost experts on ants.
- Anthony Edwards (basketball) (born 2001), American basketball player nicknamed "Ant-Man".

=== Surnamed "Antman" ===
- Aki Antman, computer programmer and author of SuperBBS
- Giora Antman (born 1962), Israeli soccer player and coach
- Karen H. Antman, American physician and academic
- Niv Antman (born 1992), Israeli footballer
- Oliver Antman (born 2001), Finnish footballer
- Sören Antman (born 1967), Swedish boxer
- Stuart S. Antman (born 1939), American mathematician

=== Surnamed "Antmen" ===
- Ahu Antmen (born 1971), Turkish professor

=== Other fictional characters ===
- "Ant Man", a fictional man/ant hybrid in the Indian superhero franchise Krrish (franchise)

== Other uses ==
- "Antman" (song), a song by The Red Chord from Clients
- Casio G-Shock Antman, Master of G series watch

== See also ==
- Ant-Man and the Wasp, 2018 sequel film to the 2015 MCU film
- Antoan
- Antuan
- Manant (disambiguation) including man-ant
- Ant (disambiguation)
- Man (disambiguation)
