= Antoun =

Antoun is a given name and surname, typically a transliteration of Arabic أنطون (Anṭūn), also spelt Antoon, used by Christian Arabs. Notable people with the name Antoun include:.

== Given name ==
- Antoun Khouri (1931–2017), Syrian bishop
- Antoun Saadeh (1904 – 1949), Lebanese philosopher, writer and politician
- Antoun Sehnaoui (born 1972), Lebanese banker,

== Middle name ==
- Dani Antoun Bterrani (born 1972), Kuwaiti businessman
- Youssef Antoun Makhlouf, Lebanese monk

== Surname ==
- Gustavo Antoun (born 1957), Argentine footballer
- Richard T. Antoun (1932 – 2009), American anthropologist

== See also ==
- Antoan
- Antoin
- Anton (given name)
- Anton (surname)
- Antoon
- Antun
- Antun Maqdisi
