= Rochebrune =

Rochebrune may refer to the following places in France:

- Rochebrune, Hautes-Alpes, a commune in the department of Hautes-Alpes
- Rochebrune, Drôme, a commune in the department of Drôme
- Pic de Rochebrune, a mountain of Cottian Alps
- Pic de Petit Rochebrune, a mountain of Cottian Alps
- Château de Rochebrune, historic castle in Charente, France

Rochebrune can also be a surname:

- Antoine de Rochebrune, French Roman Catholic priest
- Alphonse Trémeau de Rochebrune, French zoologist
- François Rochebrune, French soldier and Polish general who organized the Zouaves of Death
- Octave de Rochebrune (1824–1900), French painter, sculptor and etcher
