= Jean-Antoine =

Jean Antoine is a French given name. Notable people with the name include:

- Jean-Antoine Alavoine (1778–1834), French architect
- Jean Antoine de Baïf (1532–1589), French poet
- Jean-Antoine Carrel (1829–1891), Italian mountain climber
- Jean-Antoine Chaptal (1756–1832), French chemist, physician and politician
- Jean-Antoine Constantin (1756–1844), French painter
- Jean-Antoine Courbis (1752–1795), French lawyer and revolutionary
- Jean-Antoine Dubois (1765–1848), French Catholic missionary in India
- Jean-Antoine Gleizes (1773–1843), French writer and advocate of vegetarianism
- Jean-Antoine Gros (1740–1790), French painter
- Jean-Antoine Houdon (1741–1828), French neoclassical sculptor
- Jean-Antoine Lépine (1720–1814), French watchmaker
- Jean-Antoine Letronne (1787–1848), French archaeologist
- Jean-Antoine Marbot (1754–1800), French general and politician
- Jean-Antoine Morand (1727–1794), French architect and urban planner
- Jean-Antoine Nollet (1700–1770), French clergyman and physicist
- Jean-Antoine Panet (1751–1815), Canadian notary, lawyer, judge and political figure
- Jean-Antoine Petipa (1787–1855), French ballet dancer
- Jean-Antoine Romagnesi (1690–1742), French actor and playwright
- Jean-Antoine Roucher (1745–1794), French poet
- Jean-Antoine Verdier (1767–1839), French general
- Jean-Antoine Villemin (1827–1892), French physician
- Jean-Antoine Watteau (1684–1721), French painter

== See also ==
- Jean Antoine, a former American female professional wrestler
- Jean (male given name)
- Antoine
