= Antxon =

Antxon or Antxón is the Basque form of the masculine given name Antton in use in the Basque Country. Notable people with this name include the following:

- Antxón Jaso (born 1997), Spanish footballer
- Antxón Muneta (born 1986), Spanish footballer
- Antxon Olarrea, Spanish syntactician and linguist

== See also ==
- Anton (given name)
- Anthon (given name)
- Antoon
- Antron (given name)
- Antton (name)
- Antwon (name)
