= Twan =

Twan is a Dutch masculine given name that is a diminutive form of Antonius, Anton, Antoon, Anthonis, Anthoon, Antonie and Antonis used in Belgium, Netherlands, South Africa, Namibia, Indonesia and Suriname. It is a phonetic spelling of "Toine", short for "Antoine", the French form of Anthony/Antonius. People with the name include:

- Twan Castelijns (born 1989), Dutch cyclist
- Twan Burg (born 1991), Dutch chess grandmaster
- Twan van Gendt (born 1992), Dutch cyclist
- Twan Huys (born 1964), Dutch journalist, television presenter, and author.
- Twan Poels, nickname of Antonius Johannes Petrus Poels, (born 1963), Dutch cyclist
- Twan Russell (born 1974), American football linebacker
- Twan Scheepers (born 1971), Dutch footballer
- Twan Smits (born 1985), Dutch footballer

== See also ==
- TWAN (disambiguation)
- Twan, a character in the 2005 rap opera Trapped in the Closet
- Twan River District, a district of Liberia
