= Antoon =

Antoon is a Dutch masculine given name that is an alternate form of Antonius used in Belgium, Netherlands, Suriname, South Africa, Namibia, and Indonesia, a nickname and a surname. Antoon is also a transliteration of Arabic أنطون (Anṭūn), also spelt Antoun, and typically used as both a given name and surname of Christian Arabs. Notable people with the name Antoon include:

== Given name ==
- Antoon Van den Braembussche (born 1946), Belgian philosopher
- Antoon De Brauwer (born 1964), Belgian canoeist
- Antoon Claeissens (1536–1613), Flemish painter
- Antoon Coolen (1897–1961), Dutch writer
- Antoon Derkinderen (1859–1925), Dutch painter and autobiographer
- Antony van der Does (1609–1680), Flemish engraver and print maker
- Antoon Faydherbe (1550–1653), Flemish sculptor
- Antoon van den Heuvel (1600–1677), Flemish painter
- Antoon Jurgens (1805–1880), Dutch businessman
- Antoon Kanis (born 1990), Dutch politician
- Antoon Leenaars (born 1951), Canadian psychologist
- Antoon Postma (1929–2016), Dutch anthropologist
- Antoon Emeric Marcel De Roo (1936–1971), Belgian ornithologist
- Antoon Sallaert (1594–1650), Flemish Baroque painter, draughtsman and printmaker
- Antoon Sanders (1586–1664), Flemish Catholic priest, theologian, antiquarian and historian
- Antoon van Schendel (1910–1990), Dutch cyclist
- Antoon van der Steen (1936–2019), Dutch cyclist
- Antoon Stillemans (1832–1916), Bishop of Ghent from 1890 to 1916
- Antoon van Tsestich (born 1550)
- Antoon Veerman (1916–1993), Dutch politician
- Antoon Ven (born 1935), Belgian rower
- Antoon (singer) (born 2002), Dutch singer
- Antoon Verschoot (1925–2017), Belgian firefighter and bugler
- Antoon Jozef Witteryck (1865–1934), teacher, printer, publisher and Esperantist from Belgium
- Antoon Van Ysendyck (1801–1875), Belgian painter

== Nickname ==
- Antoon Kolen, nickname for Anthonius Wilhelmus Johannes Kolen (1953–2004), Dutch mathematician
- Antoon Vergote, nickname for Antoine Vergote (1921–2013), Belgian Roman Catholic priest
- Antoon Verlegh, nickname for Antonius Wilhelmus Verlegh (1896–1960), Dutch football player

== Surname ==
- A. J. Antoon (1944–1992), American theatre director
- Feras Antoon (born 1974), Canadian businessman
- Jason Antoon (born 1971), American actor
- John Antoon (born 1946), American judge
- Sinan Antoon (born 1967), Iraqi poet, novelist, scholar, and literary translator

== See also ==
- White-nosed coati, sometimes called Antoon
- Anthon (given name)
- Anthon (surname)
- Antoan
- Antoin
- Anton (given name)
- Antono (name)
- Antoun
- Antron (given name)
- Antton (name)
- Antwon (name)
- Antxon
