= Korlević =

Korlević is a Croatian surname. Notable people with the surname include:

- Antun Korlević (1851–1915), Croatian entomologist, educator, and writer
- Korado Korlević (born 1958), Croatian teacher and amateur astronomer
