= Titou =

Titou is a French nickname (or surname) that is a diminutive form of Titouan and Antoine used in French-speaking countries. Notable people with this nickname include the following:

- Christophe "Titou" Lamaison (born 1971), French rugby union player
- Souad Titou (born 1986), Algerian handball player
- Titou Le Lapinou, fictional French singer, a rabbit (active in 2006–2008)

== See also ==
- Tito (disambiguation)
- Titouan
