= Antwuan =

Antwuan is a given name.

== Notable people with the name "Antwuan" include ==
- Antwuan Dixon (born 1988), American skateboarder
- Antwuan Jackson (born 1997), American football player
- Antwuan Wyatt (born 1975), American football player

== See also ==
- Antjuan Tobias
- Antuan
- Antwaan Randle El
- Antwan
- Antwaun
- Antwun Echols
