= Yabroud =

Yabroud يبرود Yabrud
- City
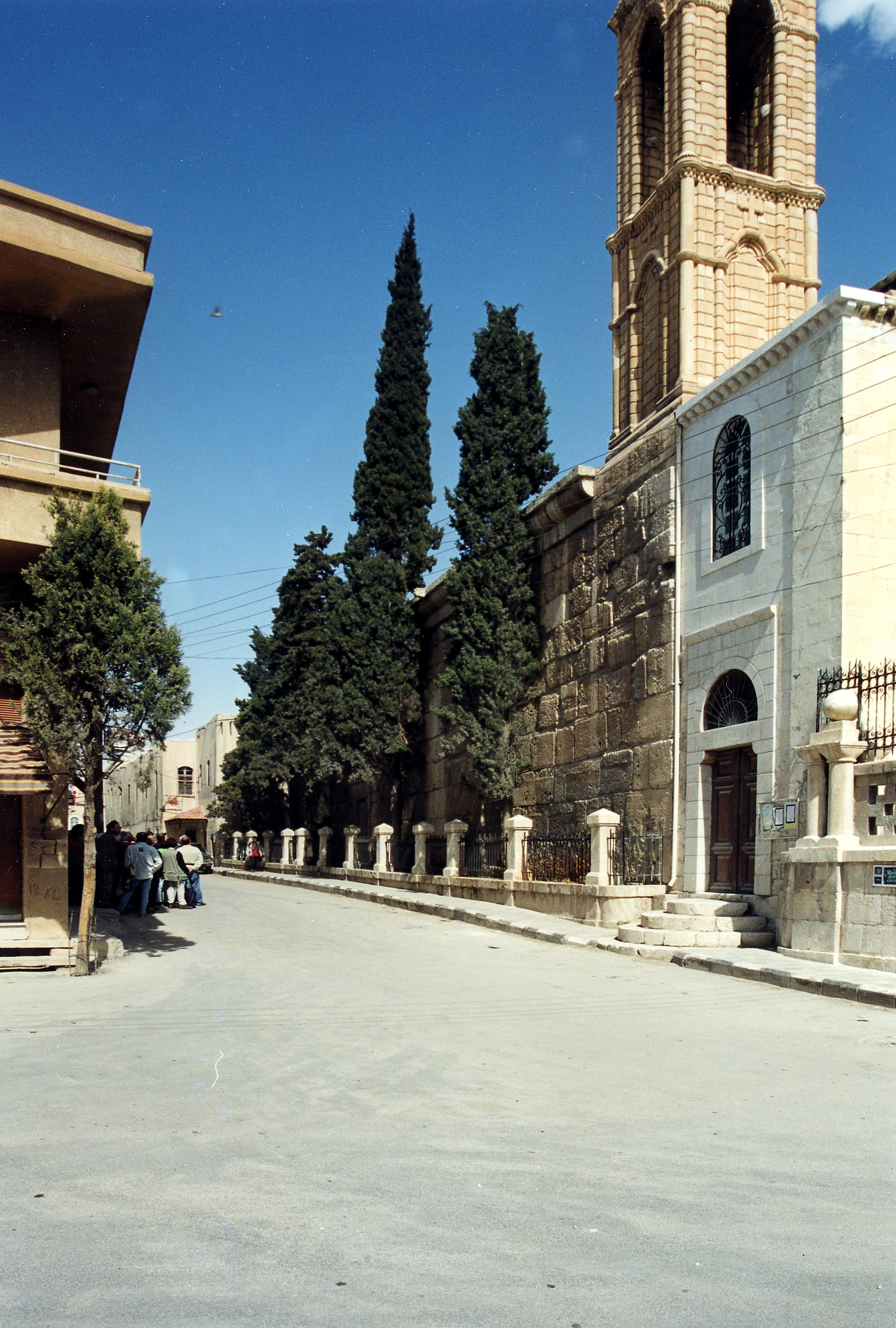
- Street view in front of the cathedral of Sts Constantine and Helena

- Location in Syria
- Coordinates: 33°58′N 36°40′E
- Country: Syria
- Governorate: Rif Dimashq
- District: Yabroud
- Subdistrict: Yabroud
- Elevation: 1,550 m (5,090 ft)

Population (2004 census)
  - City: 25,891
  - Metro: ~50,000
- Area code: 12

Yabroud or Yabrud (Arabic: يَبْرُود, romanized: Yabrūd) is a city in Syria, located in the Rif Dimashq (i.e. Damascus' countryside) governorate about 80 kilometres (50 mi) north of the capital, Damascus. According to the Syria Central Bureau of Statistics (CBS), Yabroud had a population of 25,891 in the 2004 census. Its population consists of Christians and Sunni Muslims.

The city is known for its cathedral dedicated to Saint Constantine and his mother Saint Helena, which is considered by some to be the oldest church in Syria. Jabroudian caves were discovered in the area in 1930. During the Syrian civil war, the area was controlled by rebels from 2011 to 2014 before being retaken by government forces.

== History ==
The city is known for its ancient caves, most notably the Iskafta cave (where, in 1930, a thirty-year-old German traveller and self-taught archaeologist Alfred Rust made many important pre-historical findings), which dates back to a period known as Jabroudian culture, named after Yabroud. The city is also known for its cathedral, which was formerly a Roman temple dedicated to Jupiter and before that an Aramean pagan temple dedicated to the god Baalshamin.

Yabroud was mentioned in the pottery tablets of Mesopotamia in the first century B.C., and Ptolemy's writings in the second century A.D.

In 1838, its inhabitants were Sunni Muslim, Greek Catholic and Greek Orthodox Christians.

During the Syrian Civil War the city was the center of the Battle of Yabroud in March 2014. The city was held by rebels from 2011 to 2014, before being retaken by Ba'athist Syria and was one of the last places the rebels controlled in the Qalamoun Mountains along the Lebanese border.

== Notable people ==
- The parents of Carlos Menem, former President of Argentina, were both born in Yabroud; they emigrated to Argentina before the end of World War I.
- Antun Maqdisi (1914–2005), Syrian philosopher, politician and human rights activist, died in Yabroud.
- Gregory Atta (1815–1899), Syrian archbishop, lived for a time in Yabroud.
- Youssef Halaq (1939–2007), Syrian writer and literary translator.
- George Haswani, Syrian-Russian businessman.
- Saeed Alnahhal, Syrian-Swedish journalist.
- Mariam Faransis, Syrian scholar and writer.
- Jean-Abdo Arbach, B.C., (born 1952), Syrian Melkite Greek Catholic Archeparch of Homs, Hama and Yabroud

== Gallery ==
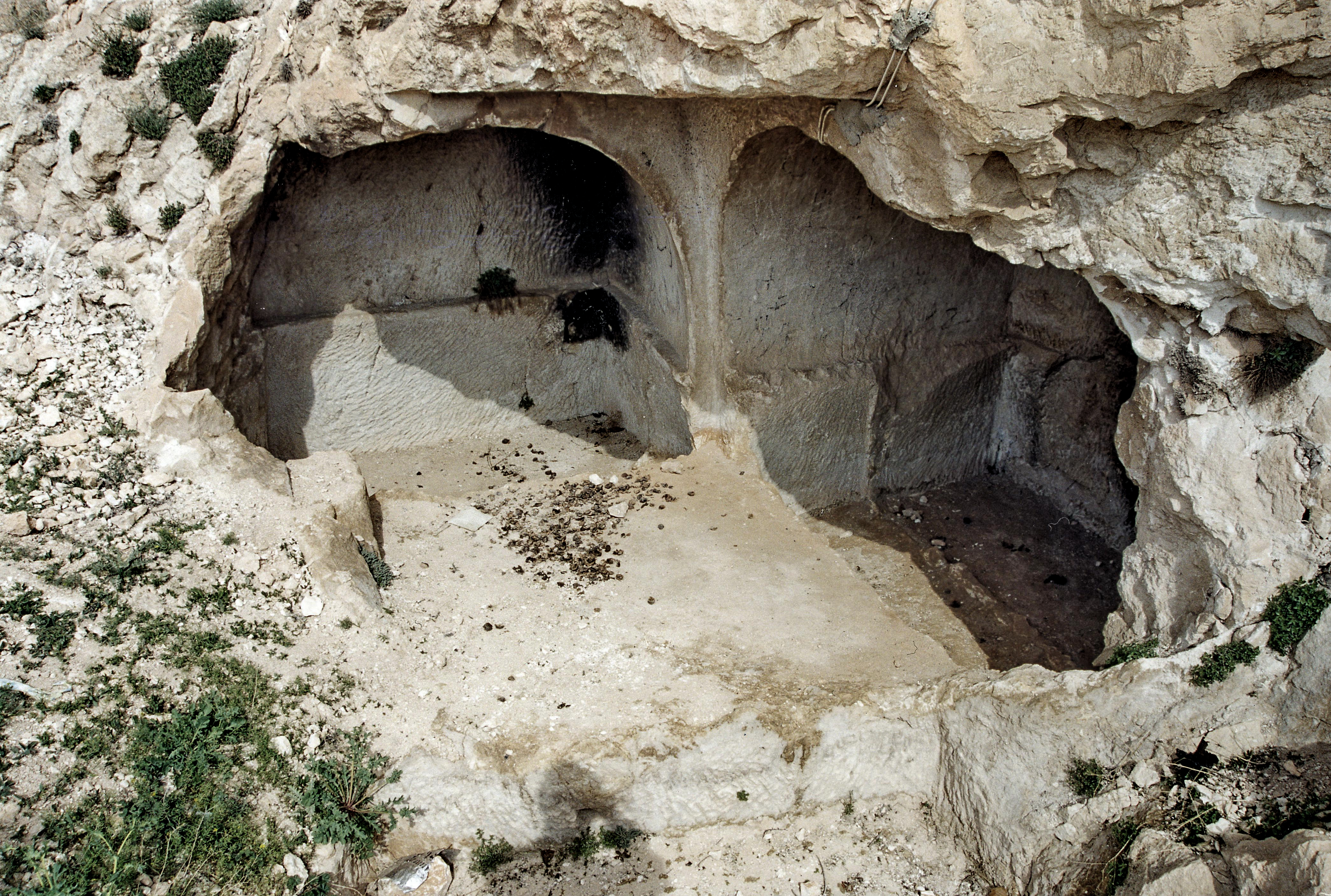
Iskafta cave

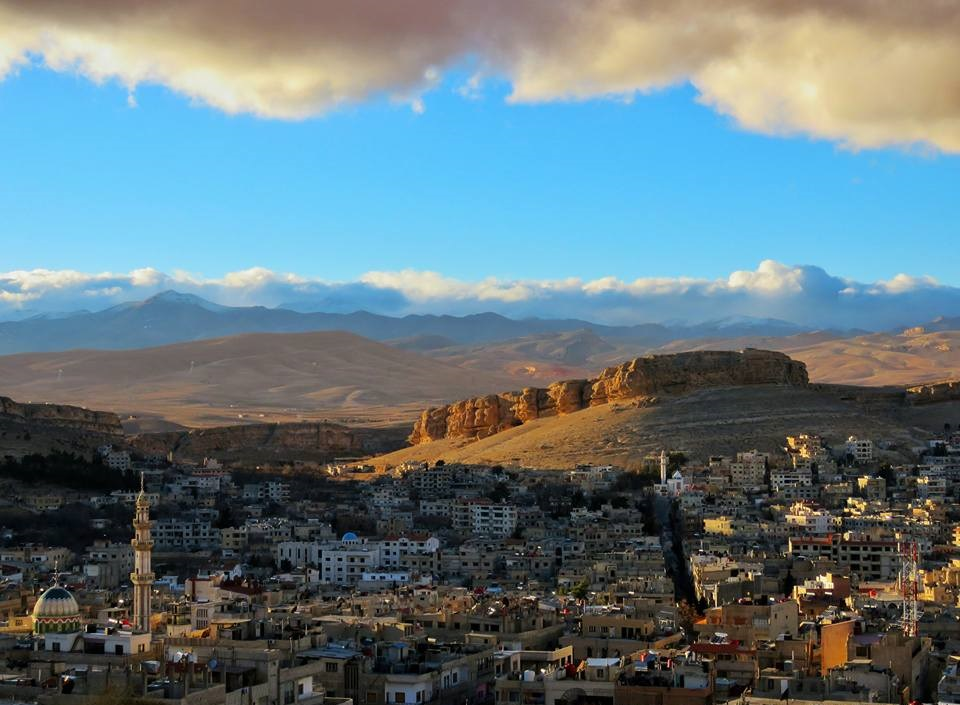
Overview of Yabroud

== Works cited ==
=== Books ===
- Aliquot, Julien (2009). La Vie religieuse au Liban sous l'Empire romain (in French). Beirut: Presses de l’Ifpo. ISBN 978-2-35159-160-4.
- Burns, Ross (2009) [1992]. The Monuments of Syria (3rd ed.). London, UK: I. B. Tauris. ISBN 978-1-84511-947-8.
- Philips, Christopher (2016). The Battle for Syria: International Rivalry in the New Middle East. Yale University Press. ISBN 978-0-300-21717-9. JSTOR j.ctv1k03s4j.
- Robinson, E.; Smith, E. (1841). Biblical Researches in Palestine, Mount Sinai and Arabia Petraea: A Journal of Travels in the year 1838. Vol. 3. Boston: Crocker & Brewster.

=== News ===
- "Syria claims to have captured rebel stronghold on Lebanese border". The Guardian. 16 March 2014. Archived from the original on 7 July 2025.
- Conroy, Erin (17 March 2014). "Syrian forces take full control of the rebel bastion Yabroud". Radio France Internationale. Archived from the original on 7 July 2025.
