= Jabroudian =

Middle Paleolithic culture in the Mediterranean

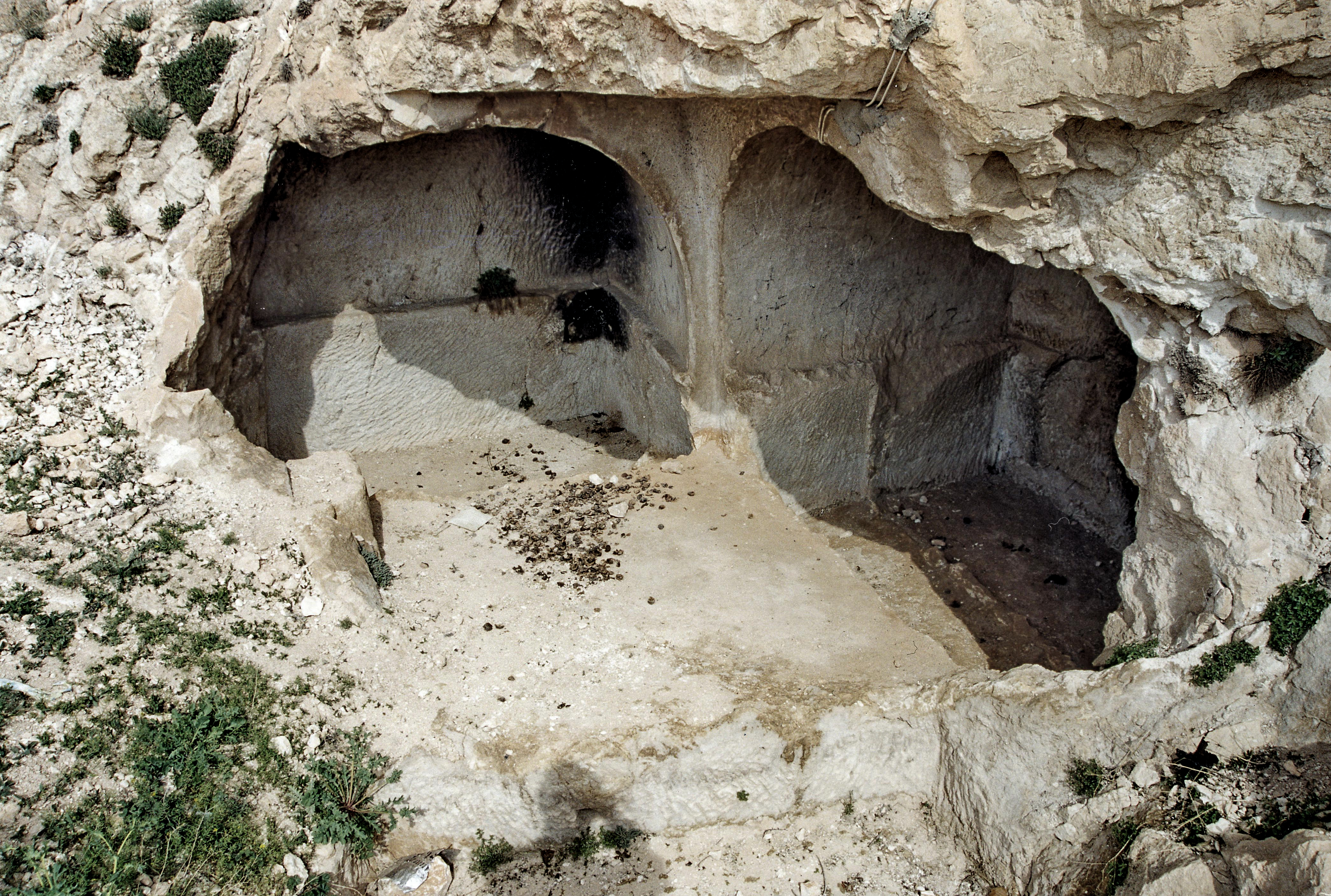
Jabroudian culture was named after Yabroud, where Iskafta cave was found in Syria

The Jabroudian culture is a cultural phase of the Middle Paleolithic of the Levant. It broadly belongs to the Mousterian archaeological culture, and shows connections with the European facies La Quina.

One of the most noticeable elements is the so-called Amoudian elements, that are the first known stone blades ever. Nevertheless, the connection of this Amoudian innovations with later Upper Paleolithic blades is most likely null.

== Etymology ==
German prehistoric archaeologist Alfred Rust named the period after Yabroud (spelled as Jabrud in German) in Syria, where caves carved into the cliffs of the wadi (valley) of Skifta found near it.

== Tools ==
The thick layers of Jabroudian consist mainly in heavy scratchers and hand axes. The proportion of the first type of tools tends to increase as time passes, while the axes show a decrease even totally disappearing in the upper layer of some Jabroudian sites.

=== Amoudian blades ===
A most interesting facet of Jabroudian culture are the so-called Amoudian blade tools. This is the earliest known stone blade industry ever and it's always found inserted in Jabroudian sites, with both "cultures" being inseparable. As with the hand axes, the proportion of stone blades decreases with time, until it finally vanishes with the end of Yabrudian culture.

There is a gap of c. 10,000 years between the end of this blade tradition and the appearance of Upper Paleolithic technology, based precisely on stone blades.

== Human remains ==
The only human remain associated with this culture is a skull found in the cave of Zuttiyeh, in the Galilee region of Israel, that belongs to a Neanderthal.

== Hunting ==
There is evidence that the Jabroudian people hunted a wide array of animals: elephants, rhinoceros, antelopes and small animals are all found in their sites.

== End of Jabroudian ==
The end of this culture is associated to the introduction of other (also Mousterian) cultural trends, of Levalloisian tradition, that were widely distributed through Western and Central Asia.

== See also ==
- Paleolithic
- Mousterian
- Neanderthal
- Acheulo-Yabrudian complex

== Bibliography ==
- M. H. Alimen and M. J. Steve, Historia Universal siglo XXI. Prehistoria. Siglo XXI Editores, 1970 (reviewed and corrected in 1994) (original German edition, 1966, titled Vorgeschichte). ISBN 84-323-0034-9
