= Antwoine =

Antwoine is a given name. Notable people with the name include:

- Antwoine Hackford (born 2004), English footballer
- Antwoine Sanders (born 1977), American football player
- Antwoine Womack (born 1978), American football player

== See also ==
- Antoine
- Antwone
- Antwaine Wiggins
