= Titouan =

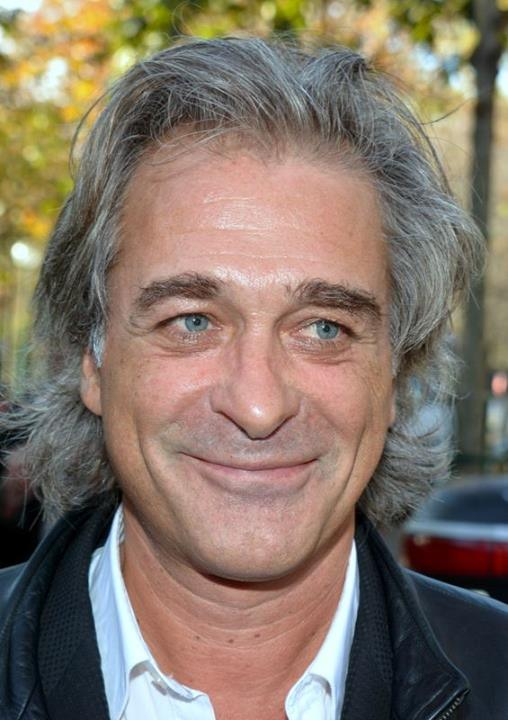
Titouan Lamazou at the recording of "Vivement dimanche"

Titouan is a French given name that is a form of Antoine used in France, Switzerland, Belgium, Canada, West Greenland, Haiti, French Guiana, Madagascar, Benin, Niger, Burkina Faso, Ivory Coast, Guinea, Senegal, Mauritania, Western Sahara, Morocco, Algeria, Tunisia, Chad, Central African Republic, Cameroon, Equatorial Guinea, Gabon, Republic of the Congo, Democratic Republic of the Congo, Burundi, and Rwanda. Notable people with this name include the following:

- Titouan Bernicot (born 1998 or 1999), French Polynesian coral reef-focused environmentalist
- Titouan Castryck (born 2004), French slalom canoeist
- Titouan Carod (born 1994), French cyclist
- Titouan Droguet (born 2001), French professional tennis player
- Titouan Lamazou (born 1955), French artist and writer
- Titouan Perrin-Ganier (born 1991), French cross-country mountain biker
- Titouan Thomas (born 2002), French professional football player

== See also ==
- Tétouan
- Titou
