= Antton (name) =

Male given name

Antton is a given name and nickname. Notable people with this name include the following:

- Antton Luengo (born 1981), Basque cyclist
- Antton, nickname of Antony Lant or Anthony Lant, English drummer

== See also ==
- Anthon (given name)
- Anton (given name)
- Antoon
- Antto (disambiguation)
- Antxon, name
- Anttoni Honka
