= Antwone =

Antwone is an African-American English given name associated with Antoine and Anthony in use in the United States. Notable people with this name include the following people.

- Antwone Fisher (born 1959), American director, screenwriter, author, and film producer
- Antwone Savage (born 1981), American gridiron football player
- Antwone Kelly (born 2003), Aruban professional baseball pitcher

== See also ==
- Antwon (name)
- Antwoine
