= Eliseo Barrón =

Mexican crime journalist and murder victim

- Eliseo Barrón Hernández
- Born: 1973; Torreón, Coahuila, Mexico
- Disappeared: 25 May 2009; Gómez Palacio, Tlahualilo Municipality, Durango, Mexico
- Died: 26 May 2009 (Age 36)
- Cause of death: Gunshot wound
- Body discovered: Gómez Palacio, Tlahualilo Municipality, Durango, Mexico
- Education: Instituto Tecnológico Agropecuario número 10, Agricultural engineering
- Occupation: Journalist
- Years active: 10+
- Employer: Milenio-La Opinión
- Partner: Married
- Children: 2 daughters

Eliseo Barrón Hernández (1973 - 27 May 2009) was a crime journalist for Milenio's La Opinión de Torreón, Torreón, Coahuila, Mexico, who was brutally beaten in front of his family in his home in Parque Hundido Gómez Palacio, Durango on 25 May 2009, abducted, and later found dead in an irrigation ditch two days later with a gunshot wound to his head.

Barrón was the second reporter killed in the state of Durango, Mexico in a one-month period, and he was one of three reporters who were killed during the same year and who were reporting about police corruption in the state of Durango. The other two are Carlos Ortega Samper and Bladimir Antuna García.

== Personal ==
Eliseo Barrón, born 1973, and the fifth of seven children of Adelaido Barrón Pérez and María de Lourdes Fernández. He studied agricultural engineering at Instituto Tecnológico Agropecuario número 10. He was 36 years old at the time of his murder. He was beaten in front of his wife and their two young daughters, who were ages 1 and 3, at their family home in Gómez Palacio, Durango before his abduction. Torreón, Coahuila and Gómez Palacio, Durango are part of a large metropolitan area in Mexico.

== Career ==
Eliseo Barrón began his career in journalism with the newspaper Zócalo in Acuña, Coahuila, where he worked for six months, after graduating from college. Afterwards, he worked as a reporter and photographer for La Opinión in Toreeón for over 10 years. He often covered drug trafficking and was killed for writing about a police corruption scandal two days before his death in May 2009. It was reported that 302 police and at least 20 others were fired as a result of coverage about the corruption, which is why it is seen as a motive for his murder.

Barrón collaborated with fellow crime journalist Carlos Ortega Samper, who had been killed just less than a month before Eliseo.

== Death ==
Mentioned locations within Mexico relative to the capital Mexico City.

Barrón was in his home in Gómez Palacio on 25 May 2009, when about eight men broke into his home at around 8 p.m., brutally beat the journalist while his wife and two children were present, and then abducted him. He was missing for one day. On 26 May 2009, his body was found in a ditch in the same locality with a gunshot wound to his head, at which time he was pronounced dead. The LA Times reports that a note was found on his dead body saying "This happened to me for giving information to soldiers and for writing too much."

Banners placed around the city of Torreón on the day of Barrón's funeral at first indicated that Joaquín “El Chapo” Guzmán of the Sinaloa Cartel had taken responsibility for Barrón's death as the banners threatened journalists and soldiers. However, SEDENA detained five drug cartel members in Gómez Palacio and announced on 11 June 2009 that one of the men involved in the murder said Raúl "Lucifer" Hernández of Los Zetas had ordered Barrón's murder. Three out of the five detained members of Los Zetas admitted to having participated in his murder, as well as Martha Georgina Correa Alvarado, They were later order to stand trial for the murder. who was deputy director of in the Directorate of Forensic Services.

== Context ==
Corruption in Durango was highlighted by the event in 2009.

Sinaloa, Durango, and Chihuahua form a "Golden Triangle" of the drug trade in Mexico, and Los Zetas have moved into the Durango and Torreón areas. In 2009, those areas were controlled by "El Chapo" Guzmán, who was reported by Forbes magazine to be one of the most powerful drug cartel leaders of Mexico.

In mid-April 2009, Mgr. Hector Gonzalez Martinez, a Roman Catholic Archbishop in Durango, indicated that "El Chapo" Guzmán had made Durango his home and said Mexican authorities were doing nothing about it. His statement was in support of an ecclesiastical statement that showed that the Mexican drug war was having an impact on the priesthood in both deaths and in causing hundreds of priests vacating their parishes. His statement brought to public attention Guzmán's presence in the Durango area. By 2011, the same Archbishop said that Los Zetas were now in control of Durango.

== Impact ==
Eliseo Barrón was the second journalist killed in Durango in a one-month period. Carlos Ortega Samper was murdered in Santa María El Oro, Durango, Mexico on 3 May 2009. Ortega had also been reporting on this corruption case. Barrón's collaborator Bladimir Antuna García had originally revealed the corruption case and he was murdered later on 2 November 2009.

== Reactions ==
A reward of $380,000 was offered from the federal prosecutors to anyone that would help in solving the murder mystery of this case.

Koïchiro Matsuura, who is director-general of UNESCO, said "I trust that the Mexican authorities, both local and Federal, will do everything to elucidate this crime, the latest in a long list of attacks on journalists in this country. Letting such attacks go unpunished only encourages more crime."

== See also ==
- Mexican drug war
- List of journalists killed in Mexico
