= Mariam Faransis =

Syrian scholar and writer (born 1950)

Mariam Mikhail Faransis
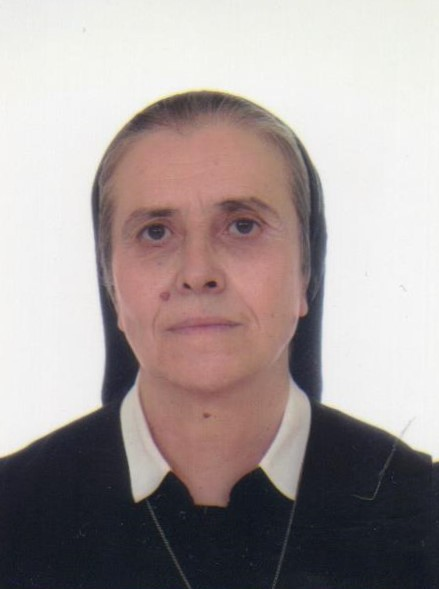
- Born: 1950 (age 75–76) Yabroud, Syria
- Occupation: Author, Writer and Professor of Stylistics, at the rank of Professor, at the Lebanese University
- Language: Arabic and French

Mariam Mikhaïl Faransis (born in 1950 in Yabroud) is a Syrian scholar, author, and writer.

== Biography ==
Professor of Stylistics at the Lebanese University, Department of French Language (1993–2017), member of the International Stylistic Association (AIS), writer and author of several research studies in the field of supraphrastic linguistics of the text.

Her researches, written simultaneously in French and Arabic, focus on the construction of the text and delimitation of its macro-components. They fundamentally result from a reorganization of two plans of enunciation of Émile Benveniste according to three plans of reference (specific deictic, specific non-deictic, generic adeictic), effectively arranged in double distinction, and the articulation of these plans on the communicative actantial composition of the text.

These are supraphrastic linguistic elements of the first importance not only in the characterization of the compositional form of the text, of its configuration, of its arrangement, but also, contrary to what is generally admitted, in the establishment of such and such a fact. meaning and style; what the author has never ceased to emphasize both in her research and during her long career as a professor of stylistics. Along the way, the author finds herself laying the foundations for supraphrastic linguistics of the text, something well formulated and synthesized in her latest work Supraphrastic elements for the construction of the text.

== Publications ==
=== Publications composed in French, which in turn could be translated as ===
- 1996, Narrative text analysis instrument, Jounieh, Lebanon, Library St Paul.
- 2005, Elements of enonciativo-referential textual syntax of the Construction of the text, Jounieh, Lebanon, Library St Paul, ISBN 9953-0-0486-2.
- 2006, «On the performativity of the compositional structures of the text», Lebanon, USEK, Revue de Lettres et de Traduction, No 12, p. 69–83.
- 2012, Linguistics for transphrastic figures of Contrastive Transphrastic Rhetoric, Jounieh, Lebanon, Library St Paul, ISBN 978-9953-0-2528-5.
- 2013, «Set of reference shots, alternation of two narrative axes and mimicry effect in La Neige en deuil», Plural Voices, vol. 10, No 2, Montreal, p. 375–392.
- 2018, «Supraphrastic textual parameters and characterization of the compositional form of the text», dans Stylistiaue et méthode. Quels paliers de pertinence textuelle? (M. Monte, et al.), Lyon, PUL, p. 171–183.
- 2025, «Supraphrastic elements for text construction. Beyond Emile Benveniste’s enunciative planes», PUSEK, Jounieh, Lebanon.

=== Publications composed in Arabic, which in turn could be translated as ===
- 1977, «Child in Dostoyevsky's novels », Damascus, al-Maʹrifah, No 181, p. 96–104.
- 1980, «Child between words and meanings », Damascus, al- Maʹrifah, No 214–215, p. 192–196.
- 1981, «The construction of the narrative in Soloist game on violent », Damascus, al-Maʹrifah, No 216, p. 167–184.
- 1998, Of the Construction of the text. Speech reference axes, Damascus, Ministry of Culture, legal deposit: ع- 1871 / 10 /1998.
- 1999, «Reading in the rhetoric of the Gospels », Beirut, ITTIJAH, No 14, p. 188–202.
- 2001, Of the Construction of the text. Actantial and referential composition of the text, Damascus, Ministry of Culture, legal deposit: ع- 1- 1662 / 9 / 2001.
- 2009, «Characteristic Traits of the Unfaithful Translator», Damascus, al-Thawrah, Cultural supplement, No 664, p. 6.
- 2013, «Street of thieves: the Arab Spring: terrorist fundamentalists here, heralds of democracy there», Beirut - Damascus, FIKR, No 181, p. 116–123.
