= Anthoine =

Anthoine is a given name and a surname, which is derived from the Antonius root name. Notable people with this name include the following:

== Given name ==
- Anthoine Hubert (1996–2019), French racing driver
- Anthoine Lussier (born 1983), French ice hockey player

== Surname ==
- Annick Anthoine (born 1945), French rower
- Emmanuelle Anthoine (born 1964), French politician
- François Anthoine (1860–1944), French Army general
- Henri Anthoine (1878 - unknown), French cyclist
- Mo Anthoine, nickname for Julian Vincent Anthoine (1939–1989), British mountaineer

== See also ==
- Antoine
