= Anthon (given name) =

Anthon is a Danish, Finnish, German, Norwegian and Swedish masculine given name that is used in Greenland, Finland, Norway, Sweden, Republic of Karelia, Estonia, Namibia, Denmark, Germany, Switzerland and Austria. Notable people with this name include the following:

- Anthon Bang (1809–1870), Norwegian writer and publisher
- Anthon Charmig (born 1998), Danish cyclist
- Anthon Eriksson (born 1995), Swedish ice hockey player
- Anthon Frederiksen, Greenlandic politician
- Anthon Grimsmo (born 1968), Norwegian curler
- Antonie van Leeuwenhoek (1632–1723), Dutch microbiologist
- Anthon H. Lund (1844–1921), Danish Mormon apostle
- Anthon B. Nilsen (1855–1936), Norwegian businessman and politician
- Anthon Olsen (1889–1972), Danish footballer
- Anthon van Rappard (1858–1892), Dutch painter and draughtsman

== See also ==
- Anthon (surname)
- Anthoni, name
- Anthony (given name)
- Anthos (disambiguation)
- Anton (given name)
- Antoon
- Antron (given name)
- Antton (name)
- Antwon (name)
- Antxon, name
- Authon (disambiguation)
