= Authon =

Authon may refer to:

== Places ==
Authon is the name or part of the name of several communes in France:

- Authon, Alpes-de-Haute-Provence, in the Alpes-de-Haute-Provence département
- Authon, Charente-Maritime, former commune of the Charente-Maritime département, now part of Authon-Ébéon
- Authon, Loir-et-Cher, in the Loir-et-Cher département
- Authon-du-Perche, in the Eure-et-Loir département
- Authon-Ébéon, in the Charente-Maritime département
- Authon-la-Plaine, in the Essonne département

== See also ==
- Anthon (given name)
