= Antoin =

Antoin is an Irish masculine given name that is a derivative of Antonius that is commonly used in Ireland. In Irish (Gaeilge) it is rendered Antóin. It may refer to:

- Antoin Essomba (born 2003), Cameroonian footballer
- Antoin McFadden (born c.1989/90), Irish Gaelic football coach and player
- Antoin Miliordos (1924–2012), Greek alpine skier
- Antoin "Tony" Rezko (born 1955), American businessman
- Antoin Sevruguin (1851–1933), Iranian photographer

== See also ==
- Antoan
- Antoine, a given name
- Antolin (name)
- Anton (disambiguation)
- Antonin (name)
- Antoon
- Antoun
