= Anyuan =

Anyuan may refer to the following locations in Jiangxi, China:

- Anyuan County (安远县)
- Anyuan District (安源区), Pingxiang
  - Anyuan, Anyuan District (安源镇), town in said district

== See also ==
- Antuan
