= TWAN =

TWAN or Twan may refer to:

- The World At Night, an international photographic effort to present photos and videos of the night sky
- Twan, a Dutch-language given name
- Twan River District, district of Liberia
