= Youssef Halaq =

Syrian Writer

Youssef Halaq يوسف حلاق
- Born: 1939; Yabroud, Mandatory Syrian Republic
- Died: 2007 (aged 67–68); Damascus, Syria
- Citizenship: Syrian
- Education: Moscow State University
- Occupations: Writer, literary translator, professor
- Writing career
- Language: Arabic
- Years active: 1968-1990

Youssef Halaq (Arabic: يوسف حلاق; 1939–2007) was a Syrian writer, professor and literary translator who translated various Russian works and publications from the Russian language to his native Arabic since 1968.

Halaq was born in the town of Yabroud, 80 kilometres north of Damascus, in 1939 during the period of the Mandatory Syrian Republic. After finishing his education in Yabroud, he traveled and resided in Moscow temporarily to study at the Moscow State University where he got a Magister degree in Russian literature in 1964. Upon returning to his home country, he began teaching the Russian language at the High Institute for Russian Language at Damascus University and in various schools in the city before beginning to translate in 1968.

He joined the Arab Writers Union and its Translation Association, and from 1968 to 1990, he translated 18 Russian language books including selected works of prominent figures such as Vladimir Lenin, Rasul Gamzatov, and Mikhail Bulgakov.

He died in Damascus in 2007 at the age of 67.

== Works ==
Those following publications are all translations by Halaq from the Russian language which were published in Damascus and Beirut from 1968 to 1990.

- Marxist Aesthetics - A Study By a Group of Soviet scholars (1968) الجمال في تفسيره الماركسي- دراسة لمجموعة من العلماء السوفييت
- Stories on Lenin and Lunacharsky (1970) قصص عن لينين لوناتشارسكي
- Alcohol and Children (1972) الكحول والأولاد
- On Literature and Art (1972–1973) في الأدب والفن
- Literary and Artistic Studies (1977) دراسات أدبية وفنية
- The Foundations of Marxist-Leninist Aesthetics (1978) أسس علم الجمال الماركسي-اللينيني
- My Dagestan (1979) بلدي
- Chosen Works - Belinsky (1980) أعمال مختارة - بلنسكي
- The Duel (1982) المبارزة
- Moloch (1982) مولك
- Aesthetic Relations of Art to Reality (1982) علاقات الفن الجمالي في الواقع
- In Culture (1982) في الثقافة
- Money for Maria (1984) نقود لماريا
- Literature and Humanist Sciences (1986) الأدب والعلوم الإنسانية
- The Master and Margarita (1986) المعلم ومارغاريتا
- The Word in Novel (1988) الكلمة في الرواية
- Place and Time in the Novel (1990) المكان والزمان في الرواية
