= Antwaun =

Antwaun is an African-American English given name associated with Antoine and Anthony in use in the United States. Notable people with this name include the following people.

- Antwaun Carter (born 1981), American gridiron football player
- Antwaun Molden (born 1985), American gridiron football player
- Antwaun Powell-Ryland (born 2002), American gridiron football player
- Antwaun Stanley (born c. 1987), American singer and songwriter
- Antwaun Woods (born 1993), American gridiron football player

== See also ==
- Antwain, given name
- Antwan, given name
- Antwuan, given name
- Antwaune Ponds
