= Antwain =

Antwain is a given name that is an alternate form of Antoine. Notable people known by that name include the following:

== Given name ==
- Antwain Barbour (born 1982), American basketball player
- Antwain Britt (born 1978), American mixed martial artist
- Antwain Smith (born 1975), American basketball player
- Antwain Spann (born 1983), American football player

== Middle name ==
- Dewarick Antwain Spencer, full name of Dewarick Spencer (born 1982) is an American and Egyptian professional basketball

== See also ==
- Antwan
- Antwaun
- Antwaan Randle El
- Antowain Smith
- Antwaine Wiggins
