= Antron (given name) =

Antron is a male given name and may refer to:

== Given name ==
- Antron Brown (born 1976), American drag racer
- Antron Dillon (born 1985), American football player
- Antron McCray, one of the Central Park Five
- Antron Singleton, birth name of Big Lurch (born 1976), American rapper

== Middle name ==
- Byron Antron Leftwich, full name of Byron Leftwich (born 1980), American gridiron football player
- Dominick Antron Wickliffe, full name of Crooked I (born 1976), American rapper
- Joshua Antron Chapman, full name of Josh Chapman (born 1989), American gridiron football player
- Killian Deron Antron Hayes, full name of Killian Hayes (born 2001), French-American basketball player

== See also ==
- Anthon (given name)
- Antoon
- Antxon, name
- Carmelo Antrone Lee
