= Manant =

Manant or ManAnt or variation, may refer to:

== Characters ==
- ManAnt (character), a fictional character from The Aquabats! Super Show!
- Manant, a fictional character from 2011 Indian TV drama Iss Pyaar Ko Kya Naam Doon?
- Manant, a fictional character from 2001 French-Algerian film Inch'Allah Dimanche

== Other uses ==
- "ManAnt!" (TV episode), 2012 animated episode of The Aquabats! Super Show!; see List of The Aquabats! Super Show! episodes

== See also ==
- Antman (disambiguation), including ant-man
- Man (disambiguation)
- Ant (disambiguation)
