= Seven Graham =

British intersex activist and counsellor

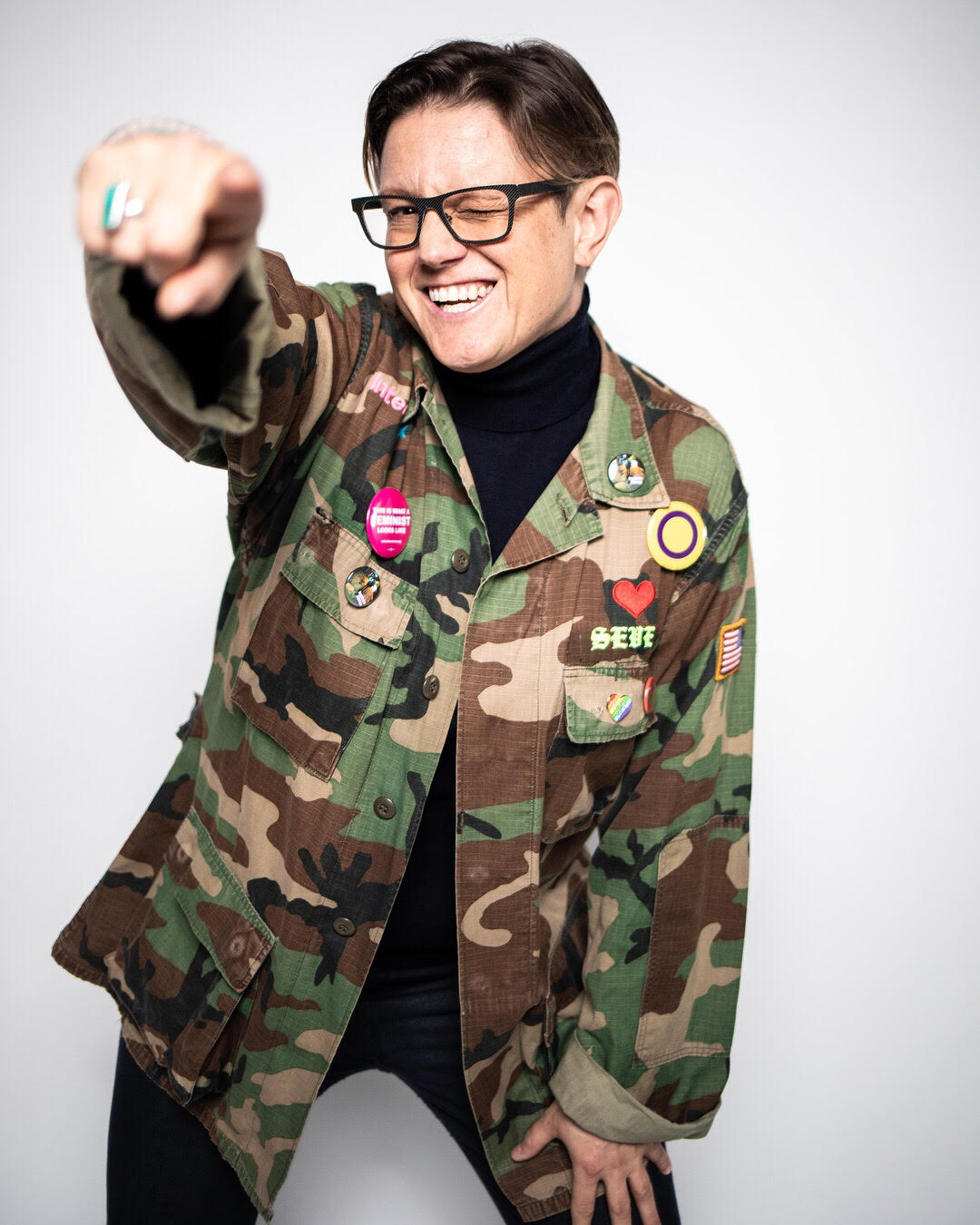
- Born: Sarah Graham; April 1969 (age 57); United Kingdom
- Occupations: Intersex activist; comedian; filmmaker; playwright; addiction therapist; consultant
- Known for: Intersex activism

Seven Graham is a British intersex activist, comedian, filmmaker and playwright, and drug addiction counsellor. He was a member of the Advisory Council on the Misuse of Drugs and is a co-founder of the Amy Winehouse Foundation. In recognition of his intersex activism, The Independent on Sunday called him an LGBT "national treasure" and ranked him second in its 2015 "Rainbow List" of the most influential LGBT people in the UK. In 2017, he wrote and performed in a solo play called Angels are Intersex, and in 2018, he executive produced the short film Ponyboi.

== Life ==
Graham was born in the United Kingdom in 1969 with the first name Sarah. He has XY chromosomes, but due to a diagnosis of complete androgen insensitivity syndrome (CAIS), he was identified and raised as a girl. Doctors lied to him and his parents about his diagnosis, subjected him to repeated medical investigations, and removed his internal testes (which the doctors claimed were ovaries) at age seven or eight "to protect him from cancer and imminent death", resulting in him needing otherwise-unnecessary hormone replacement therapy from age 12. Graham was not given his CAIS diagnosis until he was 25. He was offered no support and, already a regular drug user, the diagnosis led to a period of self-destruction including alcohol and drug addiction. After several months of treatment, Graham recovered. He later became an addiction counsellor, saying "I have turned my pain into my work". Graham later found that CAIS was likely a misdiagnosis, and that he more likely has partial androgen insensitivity syndrome.

Graham is non-binary and uses he/him and they/them pronouns.

== Career and activism ==
Graham worked as an addiction counsellor and therapist, running his own drug rehabilitation company which included a weekly LGBTI addiction and recovery therapy group. He has written articles on drug addiction for a variety of newspapers and magazines including The Sun, The Times, and Diva, and appeared on radio and television programmes including The Today Programme, BBC News, and This Morning.

Graham was on the Advisory Council on the Misuse of Drugs from 2011 to 2017. He was an expert communicator for the government drug education service FRANK, and co-founded the Amy Winehouse Foundation.

Because of his activism, The Independent on Sunday listed him as a "national treasure" in its 2011 "Pink List", and in the renamed 2015 "Rainbow List" called him the second most influential LGBT person in the UK. Graham has advocated for intersex human rights, including speaking out against surgery to "normalise" intersex children's bodies. He has also investigated legal recognition of intersex as a distinct gender, and praised Germany for allowing intersex babies to be recorded as neither male nor female. In 2020, Graham joined other intersex activists including River Gallo to help the Los Angeles LGBT Center expand care for intersex patients.

Graham has appeared as a guest on several podcasts, including Caitlin Durante's Sludge: An American Healthcare Story, Nadège August's What The Fockery?, Lauren Wallett's The Creativity Coach, and Jeff Miller and Anthony Navarro's Talk Out Loud.

=== Creative works ===
In 2010, Graham contributed an essay to the BBC Radio 3 "Letter to My Body" series, in which he expressed how the discovery that he was intersex led to addiction and depression. In 2017, Graham wrote and performed a solo play titled Angels are Intersex. After Angels are Intersex, he began using the name Seven Graham and they/them pronouns (later adopting he/they pronouns). Graham was an executive producer of the 2018 short film Ponyboi, along with executive producers Stephen Fry, Johan Sorenson, Elizabeth Sorenson, and DJ Rutherford, and co-producers Emma Thompson, Rachel Singer, and Jamison Monroe. It was the first film to feature an intersex actor, River Gallo, playing the role of an intersex person.

=== Stand-up comedy ===
On July 1, 2023 Seven Graham taped a stand-up set for director, Quentin Lee's LGBTQIA+ stand-up comedy concert feature film special Laugh Proud. The film was released for global streaming in 2024.

In 2023, Graham and fellow comic, Alyssa Poteet created LGBTQIA+ comedy show, Alphabet Soup to perform at the Edinburgh Festival Fringe in Edinburgh, Scotland. The troupe included Hank Chen, Antjuan Tobias, and Janaya Khan. The show was well-reviewed and made additional international festival headlines when it became known the performers were staying at old Second World War base and Cold War nuclear bunker, Barnton Quarry due to the inflated costs of reasonable accommodations during that time of year in Edinburgh. Graham made the decision "after being quoted £35,000 on Airbnb for a month’s stay."
