= Antoine Schouten =

Canadian field hockey player

Antoine Schouten (born 25 December 1946) is a Canadian former field hockey player who competed in the 1976 Summer Olympics.
