= Antun Karlo Bakotić =

Antun Karlo Bakotić (4 November 1831 in Kaštel Gomilica – 13 January 1887 in Zadar) was a Croatian writer and physicist.

He studied mathematics and physics at Vienna and Venice. He worked as a professor in Rijeka, as well as managing the Velika Gimnazija in Split and acting as school superintendent. He was one of the first in Croatia to publish an academic book about nature. In 1862 he arranged for printing the book Pojavi iz prirode za pouku prostoga naroda from the works of an Italian author.

He wrote popular articles in his field in the magazine Književnik. He collaborated with Bogoslav Šulek on Riječnik znanstvenog nazivlja (Dictionary of Scientific Terms). Bakotić also published the book Vinarstvo (1867). He was one of the chief members of the Croatian National Revival in southern Croatia. He campaigned for teaching Croatian in Dalmatian schools and was also a member of the Narodni list newspaper.

His novel about Bosnian life with national liberation themes, Raja (Dhimmis, 1890), was published in installments in Iskra and Hrvatska and in entirety in Dom i svijet.

== Sources ==
- Info - vremeplov (in Croatian)
- Bakotić, Antun Karlo at enciklopedija.hr (in Croatian)
