= Antoon Van Ysendyck =

Belgian painter

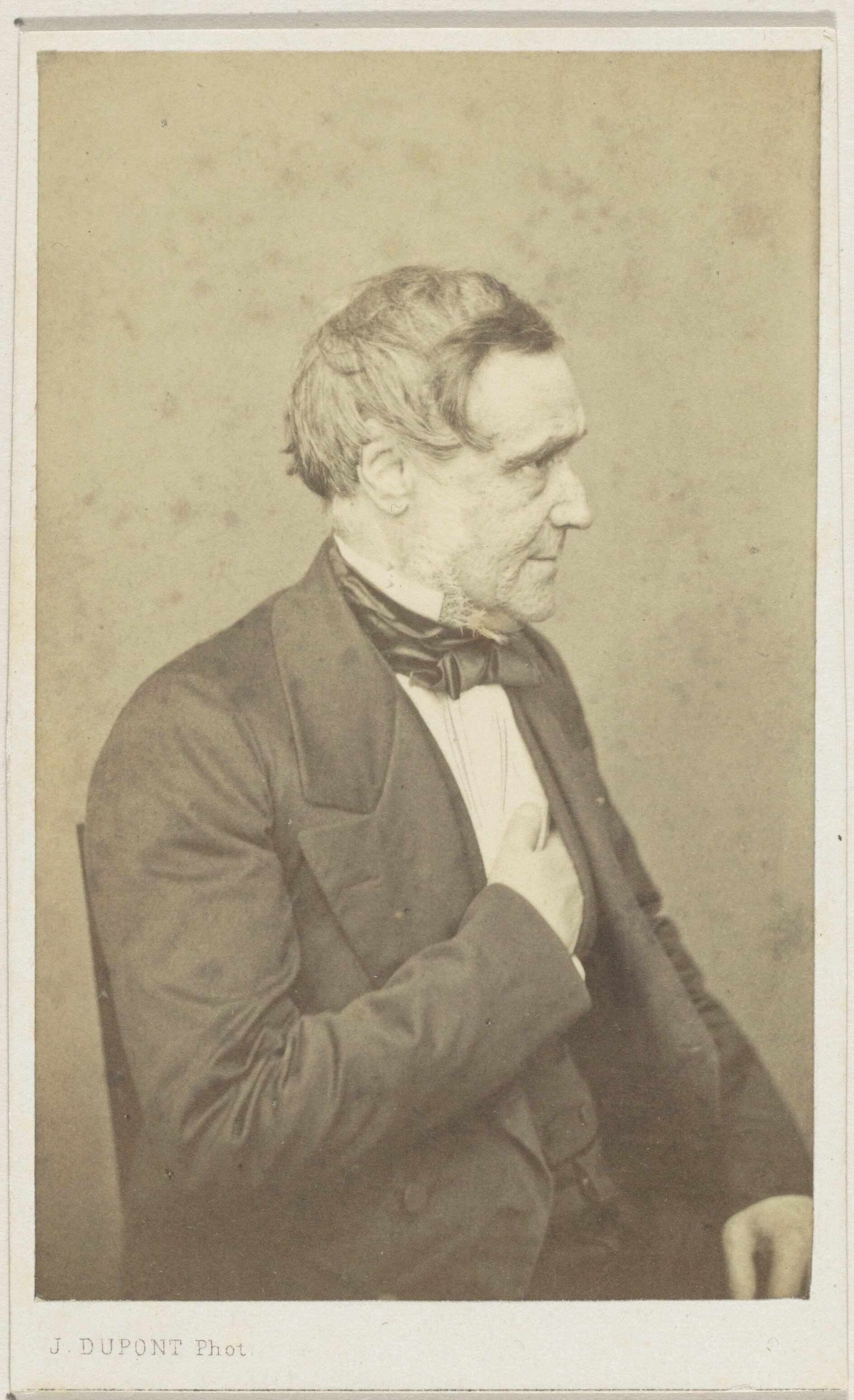
Antoon Van Ysendyck

Antoon Van Ysendyck (13 January 1801, Antwerp – 14 October 1875, Brussels) was a Belgian painter in the Romantic style.

== Biography ==
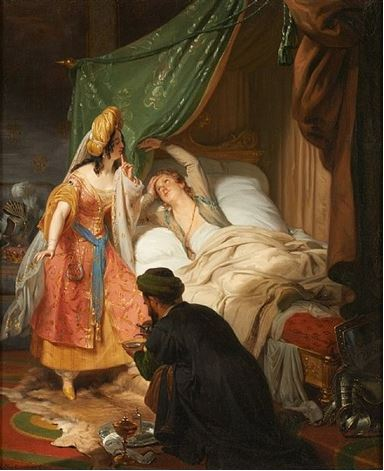
Tea Time

His father, Adrien-François Van Ysendyck, was a fisherman, originally from Bruges. In 1816, he began his studies at the Royal Academy of Fine Arts in Antwerp, and became a student of Mattheus Ignatius van Bree in 1818. The following year, he became a teaching assistant for the course, "Drawing From a Living Model".

In 1822, he travelled throughout the Netherlands and, in 1823, received an award at the Prix de Rome competition. This came with a grant that enabled him to take an extended study trip to Paris and Italy. He decided to stay in Paris, and lived there until 1838.

He was appointed Director of the Academy in Mons in 1840. He would hold that position until 1856.

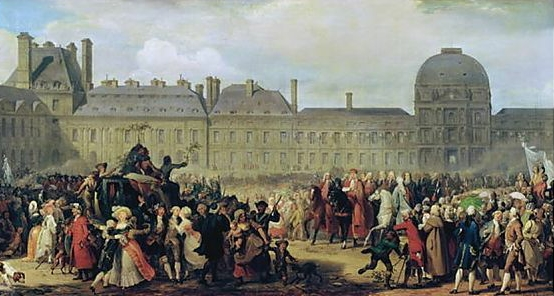
The Announcement of the Signing of the Treaty of Versailles

He painted a wide variety of subjects, including portrait, Biblical scenes, historical scenes and genre works. In 1839, he painted two altarpieces for the Catholic church in Schiedam and, the following year, one for the church in Delft.

He had two sons; Jules-Jacques, an architect, and Léon-Jean (1841–1868), who also became a painter. His daughter, Louise-Marie (1849–1870), was a designer.

== Sources ==
- "Antoine Van Ysendyck", in: Eugène De Seyn, Dictionnaire biographique des sciences, des lettres et des arts en Belgique, Vol. II, Éditions L'Avenir, 1935, p. 1113
- Léopold Devillers, Le passé artistique de la ville de Mons, Hector Monceaux, Mons, 1886
- Denis Coeckelberghs, Les peintres belges à Rome de 1700 à 1830, Institut Historique Belge de Rome, 1976.
- Le dictionnaire des peintres belges du XIVe siècle à nos jours, La Renaissance du Livre, 1994 ISBN 978-2-8041-2012-2
