= Antuan Bronshtein =

American mobster

Antuan "Tony" Bronshtein (born 3 September 1970) is a Moldovan-American convicted murderer and reputed associate of the Russian mafia. He was born into a Moldovan Jewish family in Chișinău, and immigrated to Philadelphia in 1978. He has been on death row since 1994.

== Crimes and convictions ==
Bronshtein, 19 years old at the time, was stopped near his apartment in Philadelphia, Pennsylvania on February 22, 1991, while driving a stolen car. Police found a handgun in the car which ballistics tests linked to the murder of Jerome Slobodkin, a Philadelphia jeweler who had been shot to death on February 19, 1991. Bronshtein confessed to the killing, and told police that he had quarrelled with Slobodkin over the price of some stolen watches the jeweler had agreed to buy from Bronshtein. At the time of Slobodkin's murder, Bronshtein was free on bail awaiting trial on burglary charges. Bronshtein was convicted on 27 February 1992 and sentenced to life in prison.

On June 2, 1993, Bronshtein was arrested in the Pennsylvania Corrections Institute in Dallas, Pennsylvania, and charged with the 11 January 1991 murder of jewelry store owner Alexander Gutman. Bronshtein was convicted of this crime in April 1994 and sentenced to death in August 1994.

Although newspaper coverage at the time of the killings and Bronshtein's trials did not make an explicit connection, both of these killings were later linked to Russian Mafia activity.

== Appeals and stays ==
=== State ===
On July 16, 1997, then governor Tom Ridge signed a death warrant for Bronshtein, authorizing his execution by lethal injection. The Supreme Court of Pennsylvania issued a stay on 28 July 1997 to allow Bronshtein to appeal to the Supreme Court of the United States, which denied certiorari without comment on 20 October 1997. Bronshtein's execution was rescheduled for 10 December 1997, and stayed on 3 December 1997, at which point Bronshtein was being held in the supermax Pennsylvania Greene prison.

On February 17, 1999, Ridge signed another death warrant for Bronshtein, who was now in the Rockview Pennsylvania State Prison, scheduling his execution for 8 April 1999. Because the date set for Bronshtein's execution fell on the last day of passover, Ridge decided in March to reschedule it. Bronshtein vowed to refuse further appeals, although he continued to maintain his innocence. According to his mother, Maria Pogrevebsky, "He said that in a society of lies and injustice the truth must die. There is no justice in this society, he says." By this time, his case had been taken up by the Philadelphia-based Center for Legal Education, Advocacy & Defense Assistance, which claimed that Bronshtein was mentally ill, that his competence had never been assessed by a court, and that there had been errors in the jury instructions in one of Bronshtein's trials.

The center, acting on behalf of Bronshtein's mother and sister, appealed his execution, rescheduled for May 4, 1999, to the Pennsylvania Supreme Court on the grounds that Bronshtein was not competent to refuse further appeals. On April 16, 1999, the court refused to stay the execution. The majority opinion was written by justice Sandra Schultz Newman, with justice John P. Flaherty, Jr. dissenting. Bronshtein's final appeal on the state level, which was pending even as he pursued appeals on the federal level, was denied unanimously by the state supreme court in June 2000.

=== Federal ===
Alan Dershowitz joined with lawyers from the Center in appealing Bronshtein's case on the federal level. The case was brought to Dershowitz's attention by a rabbi from Pittsburgh, who sent him an article stating that Bronshtein had said that he might consider appealing if Dershowitz represented him. Dershowitz filed an affidavit with Bronshtein's appeal claiming that executing him without a proper psychiatric evaluation would be tantamount to assisting in the "judicial suicide of this incompetent prisoner." When Dershowitz agreed to help Bronshtein, Bronshtein agreed to appeal his sentence. At the end of April 1999 he requested and was consequently granted, unopposed by Montgomery County District Attorney Mary Killinger, a 120-day stay of execution.

On 5 July 2001, United States district court judge Lowell A. Reed, Jr. ordered that Bronshtein be retried for the Gutman murder. Reed's decision stated that the trial judge's failure to inform the jury that Bronshtein was already serving a life sentence tainted the trial. If jurors had known this, Reed reasoned, they might not have imposed the death penalty. Reed also found that Bronstein's trial was flawed in that the prosecutor had misled the jury about Bronshtein's future threat to society, and that the jury had not been instructed that a life sentence in Bronshtein's case would preclude parole.

In April 2005, the U.S. Court of Appeals for the Third Circuit partially reversed Reed. The court upheld Bronshtein's conviction but ordered a new sentencing hearing. Montgomery County DA Bruce L. Castor had argued that federal courts lacked jurisdiction in Bronshtein's case because Bronshtein had missed a state filing deadline in 1999. Future U.S. Supreme Court justice Samuel Alito wrote the opinion for the Third Circuit, rejecting Castor's reasoning because Pennsylvania had only enforced its filing deadlines sporadically. Alito's opinion, closely analyzed during his confirmation hearings in the U.S. Senate, stated that "If inconsistently applied procedural rules sufficed as 'adequate' grounds of decision, they could provide a convenient pretext for state courts to scuttle federal claims without federal review."

The Supreme Court denied certiorari on 21 February 2006, thereby letting the Third Circuit's rejection of Bronshtein's death sentence stand. Alito, by then a sitting justice, recused himself.

== Incompetence ==
In October 2007, Montgomery County judge William Furber ruled that Bronshtein was not competent to assist in a new sentencing hearing because psychiatrists had found him to be "psychotic with paranoid features." John S. O'Brien, testifying for the defense, stated that Bronshtein "does not just have doubts but is thoroughly convinced he is the victim of an organized conspiracy" and that this belief made him unable to trust his attorney sufficiently to allow for the preparation of a thorough defense; he was diagnosed with paranoid personality disorder and depression.
