= Pierre-Joseph Candeille =

French musician (1744–1827)

Pierre-Joseph Candeille (8 December 1744 – 24 April 1827) was a French composer and singer, born in Estaires. He studied at Lille before moving to Paris, where he worked singing basse-taille in the chorus of the Opéra and the Concert Spirituel between 1767 and 1781, except for a brief period (1771—1773) he spent in Moulins. From 1784, he became a full-time composer. He worked at the Opéra as choirmaster from 1800 to 1802 and again from 1804 to 1805, before retiring to live in Chantilly.

Candeille wrote four symphonies, as well as ballets, divertissements and sacred music (including a mass and a Magnificat). None of his operas achieved much success, with the exception of his revision of Jean-Philippe Rameau's Castor et Pollux. Candeille's version was premiered at the Paris Opéra on 14 June 1791. By 1 January 1793, it had had 50 performances. It continued to be one of the most popular operatic works in the Revolutionary and Napoleonic period and was last staged in 1817. Candeille retained much of Rameau's original music, including "almost all the dances."

Candeille was the father of the composer, singer and actor Amélie-Julie Candeille.

== Works ==
=== Staged works ===
All information from Julian Rushton in Grove.

Title	Genre	Subdivisions	Libretto	Première date	Theatre
Les curieux indiscrets	divertissement		Jean-Georges Noverre	1778	Comédie-Française
Deux comtesses	divertissement		Jean-Georges Noverre	1778	Comédie-Française
La provençale	sung ballet	1 entrée	Joseph de La Font	8 November 1778	Paris Opéra
Laure et Pétrarque	pastorale-héroïque	1 act	Pierre-Louis Moline	1778 (revised 1780)	Marly; revised version, Paris Opéra
Pizarre, ou La conquête de Pérou	tragédie lyrique	5 acts	Pierre Duplessis	3 May 1785	Paris Opéra
Castor et Pollux (revision of Rameau's opera)	tragédie lyrique	5 acts	Pierre-Joseph Bernard	14 June 1791	Paris Opéra
La patrie reconnaissante, ou L'apothéose de Beaurepaire	opera	1 act	Lebœuf	3 February 1793	Paris Opéra

=== Unperformed works ===
- Les fêtes lupercales (pastorale-héroïque), 1777
- L'Amour et Psyché, Bacchus et Erigone, 1780 (proposed revision of two entrées of Mondonville's Les fêtes de Paphos)
- Thémire (opéra), c.1781
- Lausus et Lydie (opéra), 1786
- Les jeux olympiques (opéra), 1788
- Ladislas et Adélaide (opéra), 1791
- Roxane et Statira, ou Les veuves d'Alexandre (tragédie lyrique), c.1792
- Brutus (opéra), 1793
- Danaé (opéra), c.1796
- Tithon et l'Aurore (opéra), c.1796
- Ragonde (pastorale-héroïque), c.1798
- Pithys (pastorale-héroïque)

== Sources ==
- Beril H. Van Boer The Historical Dictionary of Music of the Classical Period, Scarecrow Press, 2012.
- Mark Darlow, Staging the French Revolution: Cultural Politics and the Paris Opera, 1789-1794, Oxford University Press, 2012.
- Julian Rushton, "Candeille, Pierre-Joseph" in The New Grove Dictionary of Music and Musicians
