= Antoine Parent =

French mathematician

Antoine Parent (September 16, 1666 – September 26, 1716) was a French mathematician, born in Paris and died there, who wrote in 1700 on analytical geometry of three dimensions. His works were collected and published in three volumes at Paris in 1713.

Parent had the idea to represent any surface by means of an equation between the three coordinates to any of its points. He derived the correct formula for bending of cantilever beams. He correctly assumed a central neutral axis and linear stress distribution from tensile at the top face to equal and opposite compression at the bottom, thus deriving a correct elastic section modulus of the cross sectional area times the section depth divided by six. Parent's work had little impact, and it was many more years before scientific principles were regularly applied to the analysis of the strength of beams in bending.
