= Pizarre =

Pizarre, ou La conquête de Pérou (Pizarro, or The Conquest of Peru) is an opera by the French composer Pierre-Joseph Candeille, first performed at the Académie Royale de Musique (the Paris Opéra) on 3 May 1785. It takes the form of a tragédie lyrique in five acts. The libretto, by Pierre Duplessis, is based on Voltaire's tragedy Alzire, ou Les américains (1736). Its subject is the Spanish conquistador and conqueror of the Incas, Francisco Pizarro. A revised version of the opera appeared in 1791.

== Roles ==
Cast	Voice type	Premiere
Pizarre (Pizarro)		
Alzire		
Atabaliba		
Zamore		
Alonzo		

== Synopsis ==
=== Act 1 ===
Alzire, daughter of Atabaliba, King of Peru, is engaged to Zamore. They are due to be married that day in the Temple of the Sun. But Alzire has had an ominous dream in which there was an eclipse of the sun, an earthquake and a voice crying “Die, Zamore!” Troubled by the dream, she has arrived at the temple early. Soon her father and Zamore enter to celebrate the wedding. The people sing a hymn to the sun. At the very moment the couple are about to be married, a messenger rushes in saying that the surface of the sea is covered by strange new objects and thunder is coming from the waves. Just then, the roar of cannons from the Spanish ships is heard. Zamore reassures the people and goes off to fight.

=== Act 2 ===
The second act opens with a battle between the Peruvians and the Spanish. The Spanish are triumphant and they destroy the temple with their cannons. Pizarro orders the retreat. He confesses to his friend Alonzo that he has fallen in love with a beautiful Peruvian woman named Alzire.

=== Act 3 ===
Pizarro offers to make Atabaliba king again if he will give him Alzire's hand in marriage. Atabaliba tells his daughter to choose between Pizarro and Zamore. Pizarro orders the captive Zamore led off to be tortured, but Alzire pleads for his life. Pizarro says he will grant this if only Alzire agrees to marry him. Meanwhile, Atabaliba is plotting a rebellion.

=== Act 4 ===
Alzire goes to the tombs of her ancestors in a forest. The Peruvians, led by Atabaliba and Zamore arrive and swear to revolt against the Spanish and kill Pizarro.

=== Act 5 ===
Pizarro has decided to renounce his love for Alzire. The Peruvian rebels burst in and threaten to kill Pizarro, but Alzire and her temple maidens throw themselves in their way to protect the Spaniard. Alzire snatches Zamore's sword from him and says she will kill herself. Pizarro grants Alzire to Zamore and the opera ends with reconciliation and a general celebration.

== Sources ==
- (in French) Félix Clément and Pierre Larousse Dictionnaire des Opéras, p. 535
- Benoït Dratwicki, "Foreigners at the Académie Royale de Musique" in Antonio Sacchini, Renaud, Madrid, Ediciones Singulares, 2013 (book accompanying the complete recording conducted by Christophe Rousset). ISBN 978-84-939-6865-6
- Article on Candeille at the site CESAR. (Accessed 2 November 2013)
