= Fidel Antuña Batista =

Mexican politician

- Born: 27 April 1972 (age 54); Mérida, Yucatán, Mexico
- Occupation: Politician
- Political party: PAN

Fidel Antuña Batista (born 27 April 1972) is a Mexican politician from the National Action Party. From 2008 to 2009 he served as deputy of the LX Legislature of the Mexican Congress representing Yucatán.
