= Bladimir Antuna =

Mexican crime journalist

José Bladimir Antuna Vázquez García
- Born: c. 1970; Mexico
- Died: 2 November 2009; Durango, Durango, Mexico
- Occupation: Journalist
- Years active: around 20 years
- Employer: El Tiempo De Durango
- Children: two

José Bladimir Antuna Vázquez García (c. 1970 – 2 November 2009), sometimes referred to only as Bladimir Antuna, was a Mexican crime journalist for El Tiempo de Durango, a newspaper based in Durango, Durango, Mexico. While there was a resolution in the case of Antuna's collaborator Eliseo Barrón Hernández, the murder case of Antuna is still unresolved and reflects the impunity that is widespread among murdered Mexican journalists.

== Early life and career ==
Bladimir Antuna was married with two children.

Antuna started his journalism career before 1990. Before he joined El Tiempo De Durango newspaper, he had been a journalist at other newspapers and also had worked in radio. Antuna was a crime reporter and editor of the crime section at El Tiempo De Durango for the last three years. While working there, he collaborated with fellow journalist Eliseo Barrón Hernández, who was a journalist with La Opinión de Torreón in Torreón, Mexico. Both investigated police corruption in Durango. Antuna received three threats before he was killed, according to his editor. While working on this investigation, Antuna received death threats and some of those death threats were coming from members of the Los Zetas crime group. On 28 April 2009, a gunman had opened fire at Antuna as he was leaving his home but escaped uninjured from the incident. Later, Antuna received an anonymous call that said, "We've found your home. It's over for you now." After the attack, Antuna went to the authorities to report the attack. Afterwards he was assigned a body guard, but the attorney general had also made a note in his file that he was "paranoid." His friends said he was aware of the danger and had confided in them saying he was not afraid of dying. Carlos Ortega Samper, who also worked at El Tiempo De Durango, was killed 3 May 2009. On 27 May 2009, the same day Eliseo Barrón was beaten and killed, Antuna was threatened again. Antuna was investigating both Barrón's and Samper's murder at the time he was killed.

== Death ==
Mentioned locations, Durango shown relative to the capital Mexico City, Mexico.

On the morning on 2 November 2009, Antuna was abducted while he was on his way to work. Witnesses said two SUVs had diverted Antuna's Ford Explorer while he was driving on Normal Avenue, a main street in Durango. A group of 4 armed men with assault rifles stepped out of their white Cherokee truck and Chevy SUV to surround Antuna's red Ford Explorer. The men pulled Antuna out of his vehicle and into one of the vehicles then drove away. Around 9 p.m., the body of Antuna was found nearby the site of the abduction behind a hospital and across from El Parque Guadiana in the Los Angeles neighborhood. His corpse showed signs that he was strangled and had bruises and bullet wounds to the head and abdomen. According to the coroner's report, Antuna had died from "asphyxia from strangulation." A message was found on the body said "This happened to me because I gave information to the military and wrote things that I should not have written. Be careful when preparing stories. Sincerely, Bladimir."

== Context ==
Since December 2006 the Mexican government initiated a drug war against drug trafficking in Mexico. The violence and crime is considered dangerous enough for the United States authorities to advise US citizens to avoid traveling through some parts of Mexico. Durango specifically became violent due to a drug-gang known as Los Zetas, which competed for territory of the rival Sinaloa Cartel. The latter had control over Durango territory first. The journalists in Durango said they were threatened by the drug cartels and the state government. Both cartels used publicity contracts and instructed owners of media companies not publicize negative news about them. As Mexico tried to go after the drug traffickers, the violence escalated in Durango and other areas of the country. As the battle continues people in drug cartels make millions of dollars allowing them to continue the business as long as it can.

== Impact ==
By the time of Antuna's murder, 12 to 13 journalists had already been killed in Mexico in 2009. Antuna's case was well publicized 2009 because of its connection with Durango's drug cartels and the fact that it was the fourth murder of a journalist there in a year. Gerardo Esparza Mata was murdered 10 October 2009 in Durango on his 40th birthday. The group El Frente Ciudadano por el Cambio said there was widespread fear in Durango caused not only by murders but also by kidnappings. The morning after Antuna's murder, 40 journalist petitioned to condemn the crime. Journalists in the area said that they took Antuna's murder as a warning meant to intimidate journalists and the Special Prosecutor for the Assault on Journalists (PGJE) announced that it would take over the investigation. However, the investigation yielded no results.

== Reactions ==
UNESCO is the arm of the United Nations charged with defending freedom of the press and freedom of expression. After Antuna's corpse was discovered, Koïchiro Matsuura, director-general, issued the following statement: "I condemn the murder of Vladimir Antuna García. I am concerned that the ability of journalists to pursue their professional activities and exercise the fundamental human right of freedom of expression is severely reduced in the climate of fear created by the recent wave of killings in Mexico. I trust that the authorities will spare no effort in identifying and prosecuting the culprits of these crimes that undermine society as a whole, setting unacceptable limits to democracy, good governance and rule of law." Reporters Without Borders said, "The authorities knew that this journalist was being threatened but they didn't protect him. Now he's been murdered and they’re still doing nothing to protect the journalists who are investigating corruption and the drug trade in various states including Durango." Mexico's National Human Rights Commission initiated its own human rights investigation in Antuna's case and called on the government to thoroughly investigate the case.

== See also ==
- Mexican drug war
- List of journalists killed in Mexico

== Bibliography ==
- Lisosky, Joanne M. (2011). War on Words: Who Should Protect Journalists?: Who Should Protect Journalists?. ABC-CLIO. p. 224. ISBN 978-0313385582.
