= Antoon Van den Braembussche =

Belgian philosopher

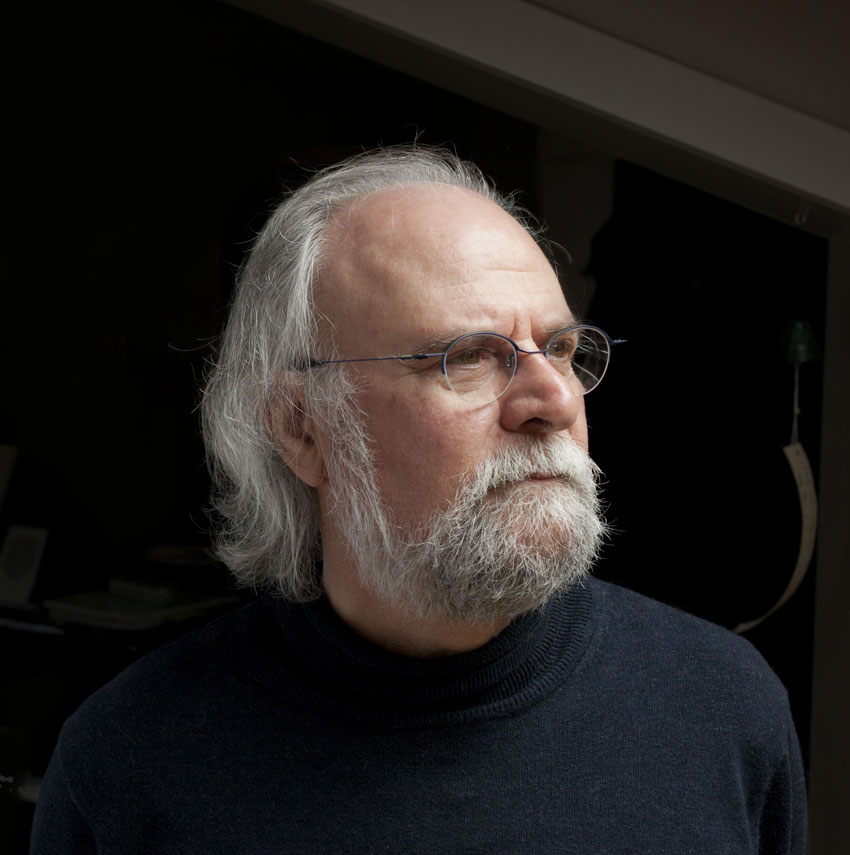
- photo: Karin Borghouts
- Born: 9 July 1946 (age 80); Eeklo, Belgium
- Education: Vrije Universiteit Brussel
- Known for: Historical explanation and comparative method; Thinking art
- Scientific career
- Fields: Philosophy of history and art philosophy
- Workplaces: Erasmus University Rotterdam; Vrije Universiteit Brussel
- Doctoral advisor: Jacques Ruytinx and Leo Apostel
- Website: vub.academia.edu/AntoonVandenbraembussche

Antoon A.A. Van den Braembussche (born 9 July 1946 in Eeklo) is a Flemish Philosopher of Culture, Emeritus Professor at the Vrije Universiteit Brussel, and a poet. He started as a poet, became a professor in the philosophy of history, and later specialized in art philosophy.

In his more recent work Van den Braembussche has focused on postmodernism, poststructuralism, and intercultural aesthetics. Important themes are representation and collective memory, and the philosophy of digital culture and contemporary art.

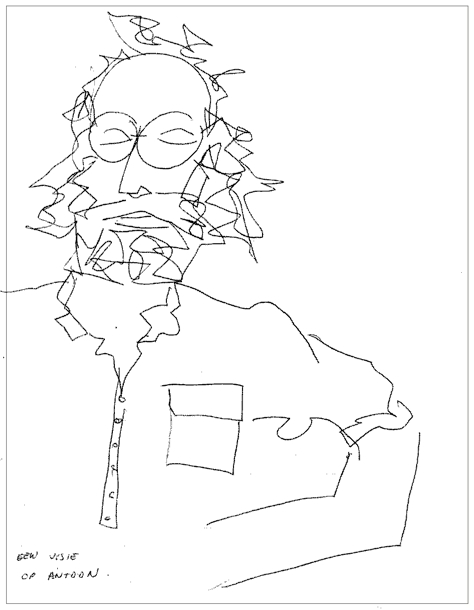
Antoon Van den Braembussche during workshop "thinking about art." Drawing by Marcel Douwe Dekker, 1998

== Biography ==
Van den Braembussche was born and raised in Eeklo, where he attended the Sint-Vincentius College. At first he established himself as a poet, inspired by experimental poetry and writers such as Lucebert, Paul Snoek, Hugo Claus, Hans Andreus and Hans Lodeizen. In 1967, at the age of thirty, he published his first collection of poetry under the pseudonym Tonko Brem.

At the end of the sixties Van den Braembussche came under the influence of the works of the Beat Generation, Zen Buddhism, and the poetry of Antonin Artaud. He won a Youth Prize for poetry from the city of Eeklo in 1969. Ten years later he published the collection of poetry Liefdesverklaring in the Yang Poetry Series, which is seen as his actual literary debut. He was also editor of the literary magazine YANG that year.

In the seventies, Van den Braembussche started studying philosophy at the Vrije Universiteit Brussel. In 1976 he graduated summa cum laude in philosophy, and in 1978 again in moral sciences. In 1982 he obtained his doctorate cum laude in the philosophy of history under the guidance of Jacques Ruytinx and Leo Apostel.

From 1980 to 2007 Van den Braembussche was associate professor at the Erasmus University Rotterdam, where he first taught and wrote about the theory of historical sciences. In the academic year 1997-98 he was head of the theory department at the Jan van Eyck Academy in Maastricht, and later he was professor at the Vrije Universiteit Brussel for some years.

Van den Braembussche published eight poetry works, and wrote about twenty books and about 140 articles. He was also guest lecturer at universities in Antwerp and Ghent, Amsterdam, Utrecht and Deventer (Academia Vitae), and further in Bielefeld and Calcutta.

== Publications, a selection ==
- Antoon Van den Braembussche. Theorie van de maatschappijgeschiedenis. 1980.
- Antoon Van den Braembussche. Denken over kunst. Een kennismaking met de kunstfilosofie, 1994.
- Van den Braembussche, Antoon, Heinz Kimmerle, and Nicole Note, eds. Intercultural aesthetics: a worldview perspective. Vol. 9. Springer Science & Business Media, 2008.
- Van den Braembussche, Antoon. Thinking art. Springer Science & Business Media, 2009.

Articles, a selection

- Van den Braembussche, Antoon A. "Historical explanation and comparative method: Towards a theory of the history of society." History and theory 28.1 (1989): 1-24.
- Van den Braembussche, Antoon. "A Philosophical Perspective." The value of culture: On the relationship between economics and arts (1996): 31.
- Van den Braembussche, Antoon. "The Politics of Time: Reflections on Time, Memory and History." In Anne Ollila (ed.), Historical Perspectives on Memory. Shs. pp. 171–193 (1999).
- Van den Braembussche, Antoon. "The silence of Belgium: Taboo and trauma in Belgian memory." Yale French Studies 102 (2002): 35-52.
