= Antton Luengo =

Spanish cyclist

Personal information
- Full name: Antton Luengo Celaya
- Born: January 17, 1981 (age 45) Gautegiz Arteaga, Spain

Cycling career
- Sport: Cycling
- Current team: Retired
- Discipline: Road
- Role: Rider

Amateur team
- 2003: Club Deportivo Orbea

Professional team
- 2004–2008: Euskaltel–Euskadi

Antton Luengo Celaya (born January 17, 1981) is a Spanish former professional road bicycle racer who competed professionally between 2004 and 2008 for the Euskaltel–Euskadi team.

== Major results ==
2003
1st Overall Bidasoa Itzulia

1st Stage 4a

2006
6th Subida a Urkiola
