= Antxon Olarrea =

Spanish synactician

Antxon Olarrea is a Spanish syntactician and Professor emeritus of linguistics within the Department of Spanish and Portuguese at the University of Arizona. He is the author of several books and articles on theoretical linguistics and Spanish morphology and syntax.

== Career ==
Olarrea completed his undergraduate studies in Madrid, Spain. He earned a PhD in Linguistics from the University of Washington where he received an Excellence in Teaching Award in 1996 while serving as a teaching assistant. Currently, he holds the title of Professor Emeritus in the Department of Spanish and Portuguese at the University of Arizona. He is also a member of the faculty of the Department of Linguistics, the Second Language Acquisition and Teaching (SLAT) Program, and the Center for Latin American Studies.

== Books ==
- Hualde, José Ignacio; Antxon Olarrea; Anna María Escobar (2001). Introducción a la lingüística hispánica. Cambridge: Cambridge University Press. ISBN 978-0521803144.
- Olarrea, Antxon (2004). Orígenes del lenguaje y selección natural. Madrid: Editorial Sirius. ISBN 978-8495495570.
- Colina, Sonia; Antxon Olarrea; Ana M. Carvalho (2009). Romance Linguistics. Cambridge: John Benjamins. ISBN 978-9027248336.
- Hualde, José Ignacio; Antxon Olarrea; Anna María Escobar; Catherine Travis (2010). Introducción a la lingüística hispánica, 2nd edition. Cambridge: Cambridge University Press. ISBN 978-0521513982.
- Hualde, José Ignacio; Antxon Olarrea; Erin O'Rourke (2012). The Handbook of Hispanic Linguistics. Wiley-Blackwell. ISBN 978-1405198820.
