= Antun Barac =

Croatian literary historian

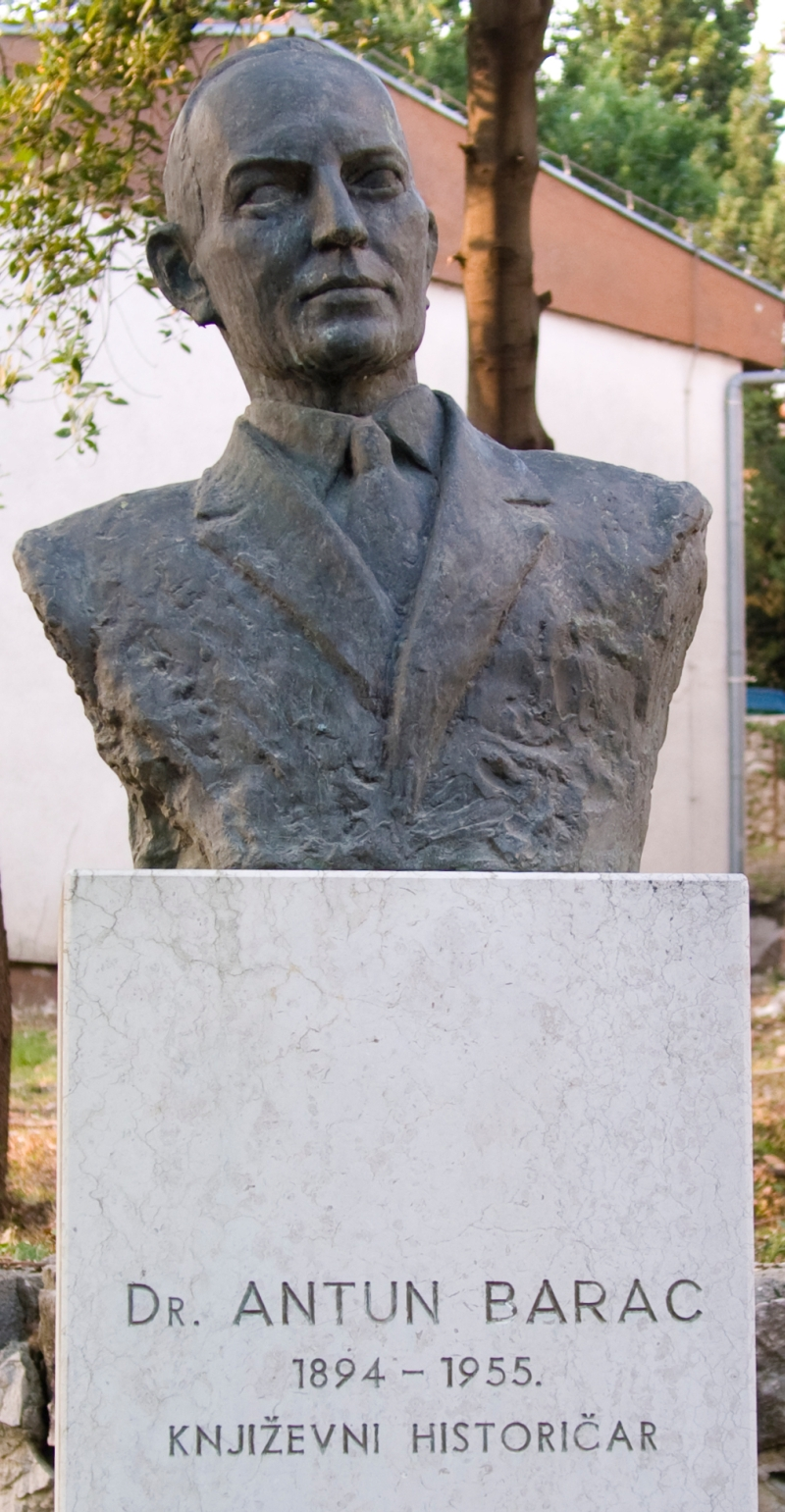
A monument to Antun Barac in Crikvenica

Antun Barac (20 August 1894 – 1 November 1955) was a Croatian literary historian.

== Biography ==
Barac was born in Kamenjak, a hamlet near Grižane. He graduated at the Faculty of philosophy at the University of Zagreb in 1917, and received his Ph.D. as a high school professor on Sušak in 1918, with the thesis on Vladimir Nazor's poetry. Since 1930 he is a regular professor at the Faculty of Philosophy in Zagreb. He was accepted as a regular member of Yugoslav Academy of Sciences and Arts in 1947.

He edited numerous scientific editions and anthologies, and has written high school handbooks together with Nazor. He served as a prorector of the University of Zagreb after his rectorship mandate expired (1950–1951). He was a significant contributor to modern Croatian literary theory, especially in the position of Croatian literature in the European context. He published numerous monographies on important Croatian writers such as Nazor, Šenoa, Vidrić or Mažuranić, a number of critic-essayist writings on lesser known writers, as well as great syntheses on Croatian literary criticism of the 19th century, and the unfinished history of Croatian literature from Croatian National Revival to the time of creation of Yugoslavia.

He died in Zagreb. A square in Novi Zagreb is named after him.

Academic offices
Preceded by Marko Kostrenčić	Rector of the University of Zagreb; 1950–1951	Succeeded by Franjo Bošnjaković
