= Pasko Antun Kazali =

Pasko Antun Kazali

Pasko Antun Kazali (29 April 1815 – 10 January 1894) was a Croatian folk-writer, poet and translator. Born in Dubrovnik (Ragusa), he went to school in Dubrovnik, studying philosophy and theology in Zadar (Zara). He was a parish priest in Ošlje near Ston and chaplain in Šipan. As a parish priest, he often came into conflict with church authorities. He spent his most creative period in Zadar, starting in 1855. He was a professor at the gymnasium in Zadar, teaching Latin, Greek, and Croatian (1855–1861), and in 1862 became a professor at the Rijeka gymnasium. The last ten years of his life were spent in Dubrovnik.

He has written the epic poem Zlatka (published in Zadar in 1856), the drama Three hundred widows Vicas (Zadar, 1857), the poem A voice from the desert (Zadar, 1861) and the epic allegory Grobnik (Rijeka, 1863). Several other works are in manuscript and the best known is Ćoso, an autobiographical epic poem. He was an associate and writer for the Zora dalmatinska journal, and edited the newspapers Zadar Glasnik Dalmatinski and Smotritelj Dalmatinski. He spoke 11 world languages. The special value of his literary work is recognized in Croatian national maritime terminology.

He died in Dubrovnik.

== See also ==
- Natko Nodilo

== Sources ==
- Pavao Jerolimov (10 May 2009). "Antun Paško Kazali". Zadarski list (in Croatian).
