= Antoine Gomis =

French basketball player (born 1989)

Antoine Gomis (born 2 April 1989 in Paris) is a French basketball player who played for French Pro A league club Le Mans.
