= Guacolda Antoine Lazzerini =

Chilean mathematician

Guacolda Antoine Lazzerini (11 April 1908 – 22 August 2015) was a Chilean mathematician and educator.

== Education and career ==
Antoine's father died when she was a teenager. She began helping to support the family by teaching mathematics. She entered the teaching school of the University of Chile in 1924, and finished her studies there in 1928, earning the title of professor of mathematics and physics with a thesis on differential equations and their application in pedagogy and engineering. She became a high school mathematics teacher at the Liceo José Victorino Lastarria (Santiago), and continued to teach there for the next 30 years.

Meanwhile, she also became a professor at the Instituto Superior de Comercio from 1928 to 1931, earning a credential as an actuary there in 1929. In 1933 she became an assistant professor at the University of Chile, and by 1954 she was promoted to full professor there. She was named a professor in Chile's school for industrial engineers in 1947, which in 1953 merged into the Universidad Técnica del Estado (UTE). She also helped found The Kent School, a private school in Santiago, in 1953. From 1958 to 1962 she held a position at the UTE equivalent to that of a dean, the first woman at that level in UTE, and from 1963 to 1968 she was head of the mathematics department in the faculty of philosophy and education at the University of Chile. In the 1950s and 1960s she also represented Chile in several international events concerning mathematics teaching. She retired in 1985, but remained active in mathematics long afterward.

== Book ==
In 1971, Antoine coauthored the book Nuevas Matematicas Para Los Padres [New Mathematics for Parents], with María Lara. It concerned New Math and set theory, subjects popular in mathematics education at the time.

== Personal life ==
Antoine was born on 11 April 1908 in Santiago, one of seven children in a family of immigrants; her mother was from Italy and her father from France, both emigrating to Chile as children in the occupation of Araucanía of the late 18th century. In 1944 she married Arcadio Escobar Zapata, a high school inspector and law student; they had two children. She died on 22 August 2015, aged 107.

== Recognition ==
In 1992, Antoine was a nominee for the National Education Award. Antoine was honored by the Agrupación de Mujeres Ingenieros in 1997, as part of their celebration of International Women's Day.
