= Antwan =

Antwan—a variant of the French name Antoine—is a male given name commonly used among African Americans. Notable people with this name include the following:

- Antwan Barnes, American football player
- Antwan Odom, American football player
- Antwan Patton, American rapper known as Big Boi
- Antwan Peek, American football player
- Ant Wan, Swedish rapper

== See also ==
- Antawn Jamison
- Antoan, given name
- Antuan, given name
- Antwain, given name
- Antwaun, given name
- Antwuan, given name
