= Antun Bauer (museologist) =

Antun Bauer (Vukovar, 18 August 1911 – Zagreb, 8 April 2000) was a Yugoslav museologist and collector.

He was born in Vukovar. He received a degree in history and archeology in Zagreb in 1935, where he also obtained his PhD in 1937. He served as the director of Gipsoteka (nowadays Gliptoteka HAZU) in 1937–1952, as the director of the Croatian School Museum (until 1966) and as the director of the Museum Documentation Center in Zagreb (until 1975). In the period 1966-1989 he was the head and lecturer of the postgraduate course on museology.

He collected art, art-historical literature, documents and materials, having contributed with his own collections to the establishment of numerous museums and gallery institutions in Croatia: Gipsoteka (1937), Archive of Fine Arts as part of the Yugoslav Academy of Sciences and Arts, the Museum Documentation Center (1955), Art Gallery in Osijek (1941), and the Art Gallery within the Vukovar City Museum (1959). The collection "Bauer" is regarded as one of the most comprehensive collections of Croatian art of the 19th and the 20th century. He organized a number of important exhibitions (Zlato i srebro Zadra, "The Gold and Silver of Zadar") and launched numerous museum publications, having contributed to and edited proceedings and journals Muzeologija ("Museology") and Vijesti muzealaca i konzervatora Hrvatske ("News for the Croatian museologists and conservators").

He died in Zagreb.
