= Jean-Antoine Romagnesi =

Jean-Antoine Romagnesi (1690 in Namur – 11 May 1742 in Fontainebleau) was an 18th-century French actor and playwright, the son of Italian comedians.

Romagnesi appeared in Paris at the Théâtre de la Foire, started without success at the Comédie-Française then played nearly twenty years in the Comédie-Italienne where he was especially successful in the roles of Swiss, Germans and drunkards.

He wrote extensively, alone or in collaboration, notably parodies, bouffonneries and harlequinades.

Some of his works were collected (Paris, nouv. édit. 1772, 2 vol. in-8°).

== Sources ==
- Gustave Vapereau, Dictionnaire universel des littératures, Paris, Hachette, 1876, p. 1755
