= Antoine de Rochebrune =

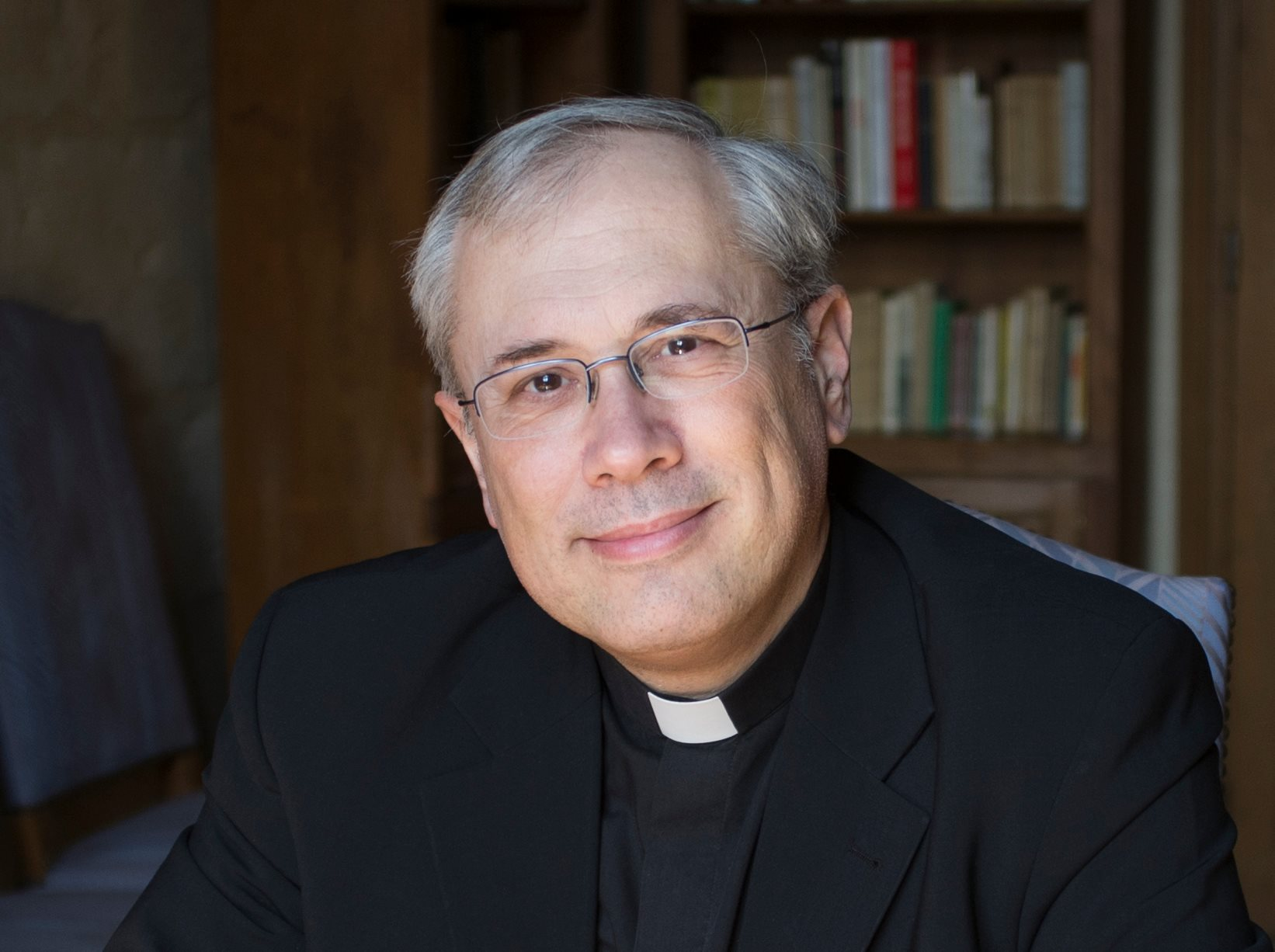
- Antoine de Rochebrune in 2013
- Born: February 18, 1964 (age 62); Floirac, Gironde, France
- Education: Grenoble Institute of Technology; Pontifical University of the Holy Cross
- Occupation: Prelate
- Parent(s): Pierre de Rochebrune; Monique de Béjarry

Antoine de Rochebrune (born February 18, 1964) is a French Roman Catholic priest. He is the vicar, or representative, of Opus Dei in France since 1999.

Since 2020, he is the vicar of Opus Dei in Canada.

== Early life ==
Antoine de Rochebrune was born on February 18, 1964, in Floirac, Grenoble, France. His father was Pierre de Rochebrune and his mother, Monique de Béjarry.

De Rochebrune graduated from the Grenoble Institute of Technology, where he became an engineer in mechanical engineering in 1986. He went on to receive a doctorate in mechanical engineering from the same institution four years later, in 1990. He earned a second doctorate in dogmatic theology from the Pontifical University of the Holy Cross in 1996. His PhD thesis was called Le munus sanctificandi des évêques selon Lumen gentium 26.

== Career ==
De Rochebrune worked as a mechanical engineer for Merlin Gérin (now Schneider Electric) from 1987 to 1990.

De Rochebrune was ordained as an Opus Dei priest on September 15, 1996, in Rome. He was a youth almoner in Paris from 1996 to 1999. He was appointed as a chaplain on March 6, 2006. He has served as the vicar, or representative, of Opus Dei in France since 1999.

De Rochebrune published a book about the Opus Dei in 2016.

He is the vicar of Opus Dei in Canada since 2020.

== Works ==
- de Rochebrune, Antoine; Legrand, Philippe (2016). Opus Dei : confidences inédites : entretiens avec Monseigneur de Rochebrune. Paris: Cherche midi. ISBN 9782749148915. OCLC 959661150.
