= Antun Maqdisi =

Syrian philosopher, politician and activist (1914–2005)

- أنطون المقدسي
- Born: 1914; Syria
- Died: 5 November 2005 (aged 91); Syria
- Education: La Sorbonne University
- Occupations: Philosopher, politician
- Known for: Adviser to the President of Syria, contributions to Arab thought
- Children: Yassin al-Haj Saleh (stepson)

Antun Maqdisi, also written as Antoun/Anton Maqdesi/Muqaddasi/Moqaddasi (1914 – January 5, 2005; Yabroud) was a Syrian philosopher, politician and human rights activist.

Born to a Christian family, he began his studies in Damascus and obtained his degree in Philosophy and French literature at the University of Montpellier in France. When he returned in Syria in 1940, he began his career as a teacher in philosophy, initially in Homs and later in Hama, Damascus and Aleppo. In Beirut he obtained an academic degree in Law.

He was one of the co-founders of the Arab Socialist Movement, that merged in 1953 into the Ba'ath Party in Syria.

Shortly afterwards, he left active politics and continued with scientific work. From 1965 to 2000 he worked on research for the Ministry of Culture and translated and edited a great number of books. In 1969 he founded the Arab Writers Union. He helped to establish the Faculty of Philosophy at the Damascus University as well.

In 2001, he was honored with a Prince Claus Award from the Netherlands for his dedication for democracy, freedom and human rights.

Maqdisi died on January 5, 2005.

== Literature ==
- Hallaq, Boutros (1998) al-Masalah al-qawmiyah ala masharif al-alf al-thalith: Dirasat muhdah ila Antun Maqdisi, Dåar al-Nahåar, ISBN 978-2842890292
