= Antun Korlević =

Croatian entomologist

Antun Korlević (June 13, 1851 – January 28, 1915) was a Croatian entomologist, educator, and writer.

Korlević was born in Sveti Ivan od Šterne and was educated at the University of Vienna in 1872 after which he taught at schools across Croatia. He was a friend of Ludwig Ganglbauer (1856-1912), and was the first professor of entomology at the Forest academy in Agram and dealt especially with the Hymenopteran fauna of the region. He also wrote popular articles on zoology. He died in Zagreb.
