= Antoan =

Antoan is a given name. Notable people with this name include the following

== Given name ==
- Antoan Richardson (born 1983), Bahamian baseball coach and player
- Antoan Stoyanov (born 2005), Bulgarian footballer

== See also ==
- Antoin
- Antoon
- Anton (given name)
- Antona (name)
- Antoun
- Antuan
- Antwan
