= Antjuan Tobias =

American actor

- Born: Antjuan Tobias Taylor; September 12, 1979 (age 47); Birmingham, Alabama, U.S.
- Occupations: Stand-up comedian, actor
- Years active: 2007–present
- Website: antjuantobias.com

Antjuan Tobias Taylor (born September 12, 1989), known professionally as Antjuan Tobias, is an American stand-up comedian and actor.

== Early life ==
Born in Birmingham, Alabama, Taylor attended The University of Alabama where he studied Communications and Information Sciences. He received a Bachelor of Arts & Sciences in May 2014 in Interdisciplinary Studies. While studying at the university, Antjuan worked as the Online Newspaper Editor for The Crimson White student-run newspaper which received a Mark of Excellence Award by the Society of Professional Journalists as well as the Mark of Excellence Award and a Gold Crown Award from the Columbia Scholastic Press Association and was inducted into the College Media Hall of Fame. He is also a member of the Eta Chi Chapter of Kappa Alpha Psi fraternity, where he acted as Vice Polemarch while attending The University of Alabama.

== Career ==
Antjuan begin his career in the theatre performing in regional plays, commercials and voice over work. He won Onstage Atlanta's Post & Alley Award for Best Actor in a Lead role for his portrayal of Jefferson in Romulus Linney's A Lesson Before Dying. He signed on as PFC Guy Riggs on ABC Lifetime (TV network)'s Army Wives in 2010. His character's arch spanned over the show's top rated seasons and episodes making ABC Lifetime TV's history books. He has also appeared on the BET Network's first scripted television show Somebodies, as well as the Tyler Perry TBS sitcom, Meet The Browns.

In summer 2023, Tobias was recruited by producers, Seven Graham and Alyssa Poteet to perform at the Edinburgh Festival Fringe in Edinburgh, Scotland with LGBTQIA+ comedy show, Alphabet Soup. Other troupe members included Hank Chen and Janaya Khan. The show was well-reviewed and made additional international festival headlines when it became known the performers were staying at old Second World War base and Cold War nuclear bunker, Barnton Quarry due to the inflated costs of reasonable accommodations during that time of year in Edinburgh. Graham made the decision "after being quoted £35,000 on Airbnb for a month’s stay."

== Filmography ==
=== Films ===
Year	Title	Role	Notes
2022	Vice & Virtue	Vice	Feature film

=== Television series ===
Year	Title	Role	Notes
2010-2011	Army Wives	PFC Guy Riggs	10 episodes
2011	Meet the Browns (TV series)	Skinny Wide	1 episode
2016	Oasis	Various Roles	2 episodes
2017	Scandal	Steve Candles	1 episode
2022	Angelyne	Bud Griffin	2 episodes
