= Anton Petrov =

Anton Petrov may refer to:

- Anton Petrov (born 1985), Bulgarian football player
- Anton Petrov (born 1994), Russian football player
- Anton Petrov (born 1983), a Russian-born Canadian mathematics teacher and science journalist
- 660931 Antonpetrov, a minor planet named after the science journalist Anton Petrov
