= Anton Petrov (footballer, born 1994) =

Russian footballer

Personal information
- Full name: Anton Yevgenyevich Petrov
- Date of birth: 8 August 1994 (age 32)
- Place of birth: Orekhovo-Zuyevo, Russia
- Height: 1.86 m (6 ft 1 in)
- Position: Midfielder

Youth career
- 2011–2017: Shinnik Yaroslavl

Senior career*
Years	Team	Apps	(Gls)
2018–2019	Znamya Truda Orekhovo-Zuyevo	21	(2)
- * Club domestic league appearances and goals

Anton Yevgenyevich Petrov (Russian: Антон Евгеньевич Петров; born 8 August 1994) is a Russian former football player.

== Club career ==
He made his debut in the Russian Professional Football League for FC Znamya Truda Orekhovo-Zuyevo on 18 July 2018 in a game against FC Tekstilshchik Ivanovo.
