= List of minor planets: 660001–661000 =

The following is a partial list of minor planets, running from minor-planet number 660001 through 661000, inclusive. The primary data for this and other partial lists is based on JPL's "Small-Body Orbital Elements" and data available from the Minor Planet Center. Critical list information is also provided by the MPC, unless otherwise specified from Lowell Observatory. A detailed description of the table's columns and additional sources are given on the main page including a complete list of every page in this series, and a statistical break-up on the dynamical classification of minor planets.

Also see the summary list of all named bodies in numerical and alphabetical order, and the corresponding naming citations for the number range of this particular list. New namings may only be added to this list after official publication, as the preannouncement of names is condemned by the Working Group for Small Bodies Nomenclature of the International Astronomical Union.

Near-Earth obj.	MBA (inner)	MBA (outer)	Centaur
Mars-crosser	MBA (middle)	Jupiter trojan	Trans-Neptunian obj.
Unclassified

== 660001–660100 ==
Designation			Discovery			Properties		Ref
Permanent	Provisional	Named after	Date	Site	Discoverer(s)	Category	Diam.	Ref
660001	1991 TE_{17}	—	October 12, 2009	Mount Lemmon	Mount Lemmon Survey	·	880 m	MPC · JPL
660002	1993 VT_{6}	—	October 24, 1993	Kitt Peak	Spacewatch	EUN	1.1 km	MPC · JPL
660003	1994 RS_{9}	—	September 12, 1994	Kitt Peak	Spacewatch	ADE	1.4 km	MPC · JPL
660004	1994 SN_{6}	—	September 28, 1994	Kitt Peak	Spacewatch	·	2.0 km	MPC · JPL
660005	1994 TM_{9}	—	October 8, 1994	Kitt Peak	Spacewatch	·	1.5 km	MPC · JPL
660006	1994 XL_{6}	—	December 31, 2008	Mount Lemmon	Mount Lemmon Survey	·	2.0 km	MPC · JPL
660007	1995 CB_{9}	—	February 4, 1995	Kitt Peak	Spacewatch	AGN	1.1 km	MPC · JPL
660008	1995 FR_{21}	—	October 20, 2007	Mount Lemmon	Mount Lemmon Survey	·	700 m	MPC · JPL
660009	1995 MJ_{5}	—	June 23, 1995	Kitt Peak	Spacewatch	·	2.1 km	MPC · JPL
660010	1995 MB_{7}	—	June 29, 1995	Kitt Peak	Spacewatch	·	580 m	MPC · JPL
660011	1995 OV_{14}	—	July 30, 1995	Kitt Peak	Spacewatch	·	1.6 km	MPC · JPL
660012	1995 QO_{5}	—	August 22, 1995	Kitt Peak	Spacewatch	·	1.5 km	MPC · JPL
660013	1995 SZ_{12}	—	September 18, 1995	Kitt Peak	Spacewatch	·	1.7 km	MPC · JPL
660014	1995 SJ_{19}	—	September 18, 1995	Kitt Peak	Spacewatch	·	2.0 km	MPC · JPL
660015	1995 SF_{23}	—	September 19, 1995	Kitt Peak	Spacewatch	·	1.3 km	MPC · JPL
660016	1995 SH_{41}	—	September 25, 1995	Kitt Peak	Spacewatch	·	810 m	MPC · JPL
660017	1995 SP_{43}	—	September 25, 1995	Kitt Peak	Spacewatch	·	770 m	MPC · JPL
660018	1995 SF_{47}	—	September 26, 1995	Kitt Peak	Spacewatch	EOS	1.7 km	MPC · JPL
660019	1995 SC_{50}	—	September 26, 1995	Kitt Peak	Spacewatch	KON	2.4 km	MPC · JPL
660020	1995 SA_{57}	—	September 17, 1995	Kitt Peak	Spacewatch	·	1.1 km	MPC · JPL
660021	1995 SG_{69}	—	September 18, 1995	Kitt Peak	Spacewatch	·	1.5 km	MPC · JPL
660022	1995 SH_{72}	—	September 6, 1999	Kitt Peak	Spacewatch	·	970 m	MPC · JPL
660023	1995 SX_{80}	—	September 30, 1995	Kitt Peak	Spacewatch	·	2.1 km	MPC · JPL
660024	1995 SP_{90}	—	October 6, 2004	Kitt Peak	Spacewatch	·	1.9 km	MPC · JPL
660025	1995 SQ_{90}	—	June 15, 2010	Mount Lemmon	Mount Lemmon Survey	·	1.1 km	MPC · JPL
660026	1995 TN_{11}	—	October 15, 1995	Kitt Peak	Spacewatch	·	1.5 km	MPC · JPL
660027	1995 TA_{13}	—	October 1, 1995	Kitt Peak	Spacewatch	·	1.3 km	MPC · JPL
660028	1995 UW_{19}	—	October 19, 1995	Kitt Peak	Spacewatch	·	760 m	MPC · JPL
660029	1995 UO_{20}	—	October 19, 1995	Kitt Peak	Spacewatch	·	1.1 km	MPC · JPL
660030	1995 UU_{26}	—	October 20, 1995	Kitt Peak	Spacewatch	·	1.5 km	MPC · JPL
660031	1995 UO_{28}	—	October 20, 1995	Kitt Peak	Spacewatch	·	1.1 km	MPC · JPL
660032	1995 UA_{29}	—	October 20, 1995	Kitt Peak	Spacewatch	·	1.5 km	MPC · JPL
660033	1995 UP_{38}	—	October 22, 1995	Kitt Peak	Spacewatch	·	2.2 km	MPC · JPL
660034	1995 UZ_{55}	—	October 23, 1995	Kitt Peak	Spacewatch	·	2.4 km	MPC · JPL
660035	1995 UG_{61}	—	October 24, 1995	Kitt Peak	Spacewatch	·	530 m	MPC · JPL
660036	1995 UU_{63}	—	October 26, 1995	Kitt Peak	Spacewatch	·	570 m	MPC · JPL
660037	1995 UD_{66}	—	October 17, 1995	Kitt Peak	Spacewatch	·	1.1 km	MPC · JPL
660038	1995 UO_{67}	—	October 28, 1995	Kitt Peak	Spacewatch	EOS	1.4 km	MPC · JPL
660039	1995 UW_{67}	—	October 18, 1995	Kitt Peak	Spacewatch	·	1.5 km	MPC · JPL
660040	1995 UC_{84}	—	August 4, 2005	Palomar	NEAT	·	1.8 km	MPC · JPL
660041	1995 VG_{3}	—	October 26, 1995	Kitt Peak	Spacewatch	·	1.5 km	MPC · JPL
660042	1995 VB_{7}	—	November 14, 1995	Kitt Peak	Spacewatch	(5)	1.2 km	MPC · JPL
660043	1995 WP_{44}	—	August 12, 2015	Haleakala	Pan-STARRS 1	·	2.4 km	MPC · JPL
660044	1995 WT_{44}	—	November 28, 2013	Kitt Peak	Spacewatch	·	1.7 km	MPC · JPL
660045	1996 AB_{6}	—	January 12, 1996	Kitt Peak	Spacewatch	DOR	1.4 km	MPC · JPL
660046	1996 AJ_{12}	—	January 15, 1996	Kitt Peak	Spacewatch	·	2.6 km	MPC · JPL
660047	1996 AV_{20}	—	February 20, 2001	Haleakala	NEAT	·	1.7 km	MPC · JPL
660048	1996 BZ_{18}	—	January 3, 2014	Mount Lemmon	Mount Lemmon Survey	·	1.6 km	MPC · JPL
660049	1996 BA_{19}	—	January 10, 2007	Mount Lemmon	Mount Lemmon Survey	EOS	2.0 km	MPC · JPL
660050	1996 HD	—	April 16, 1996	Haleakala	AMOS	·	3.3 km	MPC · JPL
660051	1996 JN_{12}	—	April 23, 1996	Kitt Peak	Spacewatch	·	4.1 km	MPC · JPL
660052	1996 JC_{14}	—	May 11, 1996	Kitt Peak	Spacewatch	EOS	2.2 km	MPC · JPL
660053	1996 RH_{11}	—	September 8, 1996	Kitt Peak	Spacewatch	·	1.7 km	MPC · JPL
660054	1996 RY_{15}	—	September 13, 1996	Kitt Peak	Spacewatch	·	1.2 km	MPC · JPL
660055	1996 RY_{16}	—	September 13, 1996	Kitt Peak	Spacewatch	·	1.3 km	MPC · JPL
660056	1996 RC_{22}	—	September 8, 1996	Kitt Peak	Spacewatch	BRG	1.3 km	MPC · JPL
660057	1996 SC_{3}	—	September 19, 1996	Kitt Peak	Spacewatch	H	530 m	MPC · JPL
660058	1996 TC_{32}	—	October 9, 1996	Kitt Peak	Spacewatch	·	690 m	MPC · JPL
660059	1996 TW_{34}	—	October 10, 1996	Kitt Peak	Spacewatch	·	1.6 km	MPC · JPL
660060	1996 VS_{19}	—	November 6, 1996	Kitt Peak	Spacewatch	·	2.9 km	MPC · JPL
660061	1996 VG_{34}	—	November 8, 1996	Kitt Peak	Spacewatch	·	580 m	MPC · JPL
660062	1996 VM_{37}	—	November 11, 1996	Kitt Peak	Spacewatch	·	1.3 km	MPC · JPL
660063	1996 VG_{42}	—	December 14, 2003	Kitt Peak	Spacewatch	·	710 m	MPC · JPL
660064	1996 XM_{17}	—	December 5, 1996	Kitt Peak	Spacewatch	·	1.6 km	MPC · JPL
660065	1997 CD_{14}	—	February 3, 1997	Kitt Peak	Spacewatch	EOS	1.8 km	MPC · JPL
660066	1997 GZ_{26}	—	April 7, 1997	Kitt Peak	Spacewatch	·	2.2 km	MPC · JPL
660067	1997 HM_{1}	—	April 28, 1997	Kitt Peak	Spacewatch	·	1.2 km	MPC · JPL
660068	1997 JN_{6}	—	May 5, 1997	Kitt Peak	Spacewatch	·	1.1 km	MPC · JPL
660069	1997 MN	—	June 27, 1997	Kitt Peak	Spacewatch	·	4.2 km	MPC · JPL
660070	1997 NT_{3}	—	July 6, 1997	Kitt Peak	Spacewatch	·	990 m	MPC · JPL
660071	1997 NW_{9}	—	November 17, 2014	Haleakala	Pan-STARRS 1	·	960 m	MPC · JPL
660072	1997 SV_{7}	—	September 23, 1997	Kitt Peak	Spacewatch	·	640 m	MPC · JPL
660073	1997 SU_{16}	—	September 28, 1997	Kitt Peak	Spacewatch	·	1.6 km	MPC · JPL
660074	1997 SY_{25}	—	September 28, 1997	Kitt Peak	Spacewatch	·	1.5 km	MPC · JPL
660075	1997 SJ_{26}	—	September 28, 1997	Kitt Peak	Spacewatch	·	1.4 km	MPC · JPL
660076	1997 SR_{26}	—	August 11, 1997	Kitt Peak	Spacewatch	·	1 km	MPC · JPL
660077	1997 UJ_{17}	—	October 25, 1997	Kitt Peak	Spacewatch	·	620 m	MPC · JPL
660078	1997 WJ_{6}	—	November 23, 1997	Kitt Peak	Spacewatch	KOR	1.2 km	MPC · JPL
660079	1997 WX_{58}	—	March 11, 2005	Mount Lemmon	Mount Lemmon Survey	·	2.1 km	MPC · JPL
660080	1998 AU_{2}	—	January 2, 1998	Kitt Peak	Spacewatch	·	1.8 km	MPC · JPL
660081	1998 DR_{22}	—	February 24, 1998	Kitt Peak	Spacewatch	·	1.6 km	MPC · JPL
660082	1998 HH_{159}	—	September 19, 2008	Kitt Peak	Spacewatch	·	1.4 km	MPC · JPL
660083	1998 HJ_{159}	—	April 17, 1998	Kitt Peak	Spacewatch	NYS	950 m	MPC · JPL
660084	1998 KH_{42}	—	May 28, 1998	Kitt Peak	Spacewatch	EUN	880 m	MPC · JPL
660085	1998 KV_{42}	—	May 28, 1998	Kitt Peak	Spacewatch	EUN	1.4 km	MPC · JPL
660086	1998 ME_{23}	—	June 24, 1998	Kitt Peak	Spacewatch	·	1.8 km	MPC · JPL
660087	1998 MV_{49}	—	October 7, 2002	Palomar	NEAT	NYS	1.1 km	MPC · JPL
660088	1998 QE_{1}	—	August 17, 1998	Socorro	LINEAR	·	810 m	MPC · JPL
660089	1998 QD_{112}	—	August 12, 2015	Haleakala	Pan-STARRS 1	·	2.7 km	MPC · JPL
660090	1998 QN_{112}	—	August 31, 1998	Kitt Peak	Spacewatch	·	1.6 km	MPC · JPL
660091	1998 RP_{81}	—	December 21, 2006	Kitt Peak	Spacewatch	V	570 m	MPC · JPL
660092	1998 RQ_{81}	—	August 9, 2007	Kitt Peak	Spacewatch	·	1.7 km	MPC · JPL
660093	1998 RR_{81}	—	February 14, 2012	Haleakala	Pan-STARRS 1	·	3.0 km	MPC · JPL
660094	1998 SZ_{1}	—	September 17, 1998	Caussols	ODAS	·	1.1 km	MPC · JPL
660095	1998 SF_{29}	—	September 18, 1998	Kitt Peak	Spacewatch	·	2.4 km	MPC · JPL
660096	1998 SL_{36}	—	September 24, 1998	Kitt Peak	Spacewatch	APO · PHA	320 m	MPC · JPL
660097	1998 SQ_{170}	—	September 22, 1998	Anderson Mesa	LONEOS	·	1.2 km	MPC · JPL
660098	1998 SG_{177}	—	October 13, 2004	Kitt Peak	Spacewatch	·	2.8 km	MPC · JPL
660099	1998 SQ_{177}	—	September 26, 2005	Kitt Peak	Spacewatch	·	810 m	MPC · JPL
660100	1998 ST_{177}	—	December 3, 2008	Kitt Peak	Spacewatch	HOF	2.2 km	MPC · JPL

== 660101–660200 ==
back to top

Designation			Discovery			Properties		Ref
Permanent	Provisional	Named after	Date	Site	Discoverer(s)	Category	Diam.	Ref
660101	1998 SH_{179}	—	June 30, 2013	Haleakala	Pan-STARRS 1	·	1.0 km	MPC · JPL
660102	1998 SB_{182}	—	September 28, 1998	Kitt Peak	Spacewatch	·	1.4 km	MPC · JPL
660103	1998 TG_{8}	—	October 12, 1998	Kitt Peak	Spacewatch	MAR	810 m	MPC · JPL
660104	1998 TY_{22}	—	October 14, 1998	Kitt Peak	Spacewatch	LIX	3.3 km	MPC · JPL
660105	1998 TA_{25}	—	October 14, 1998	Kitt Peak	Spacewatch	·	1.2 km	MPC · JPL
660106	1998 UF_{51}	—	October 29, 1998	Kitt Peak	Spacewatch	KOR	1.3 km	MPC · JPL
660107	1998 UK_{51}	—	November 18, 2008	Kitt Peak	Spacewatch	KOR	1.1 km	MPC · JPL
660108	1998 UL_{51}	—	September 22, 2008	Kitt Peak	Spacewatch	·	720 m	MPC · JPL
660109	1998 UP_{51}	—	February 23, 2007	Kitt Peak	Spacewatch	·	2.7 km	MPC · JPL
660110	1998 UR_{51}	—	October 24, 1998	Kitt Peak	Spacewatch	PHO	860 m	MPC · JPL
660111	1998 WZ_{37}	—	November 14, 1998	Kitt Peak	Spacewatch	·	1.4 km	MPC · JPL
660112	1998 WT_{46}	—	October 10, 2015	Haleakala	Pan-STARRS 1	·	650 m	MPC · JPL
660113	1998 XY_{22}	—	December 11, 1998	Kitt Peak	Spacewatch	·	1.4 km	MPC · JPL
660114	1999 AT_{18}	—	January 13, 1999	Kitt Peak	Spacewatch	·	3.0 km	MPC · JPL
660115	1999 BW_{27}	—	December 12, 1998	Kitt Peak	Spacewatch	·	2.6 km	MPC · JPL
660116	1999 BV_{35}	—	December 1, 2014	Haleakala	Pan-STARRS 1	·	900 m	MPC · JPL
660117	1999 CM_{129}	—	June 21, 2017	Haleakala	Pan-STARRS 1	(5)	1.1 km	MPC · JPL
660118	1999 CU_{136}	—	February 9, 1999	Kitt Peak	Spacewatch	·	2.5 km	MPC · JPL
660119	1999 CP_{140}	—	February 7, 1999	Kitt Peak	Spacewatch	·	1.2 km	MPC · JPL
660120	1999 CG_{142}	—	February 10, 1999	Kitt Peak	Spacewatch	·	1.7 km	MPC · JPL
660121	1999 CO_{154}	—	October 27, 1997	Flagstaff	B. A. Skiff	KON	2.2 km	MPC · JPL
660122	1999 CG_{160}	—	April 30, 2003	Kitt Peak	Spacewatch	·	610 m	MPC · JPL
660123	1999 EM_{15}	—	March 19, 2009	Kitt Peak	Spacewatch	KOR	1.3 km	MPC · JPL
660124	1999 FJ_{98}	—	November 9, 2013	Mount Lemmon	Mount Lemmon Survey	·	1.2 km	MPC · JPL
660125	1999 FQ_{98}	—	December 5, 2007	Kitt Peak	Spacewatch	·	670 m	MPC · JPL
660126	1999 FE_{99}	—	January 27, 2015	Haleakala	Pan-STARRS 1	·	1.4 km	MPC · JPL
660127	1999 PW_{7}	—	August 8, 1999	Kitt Peak	Spacewatch	·	1.4 km	MPC · JPL
660128	1999 PD_{9}	—	August 3, 1999	Kitt Peak	Spacewatch	V	700 m	MPC · JPL
660129	1999 PH_{9}	—	June 2, 2014	Mount Lemmon	Mount Lemmon Survey	·	800 m	MPC · JPL
660130	1999 PP_{9}	—	September 23, 2014	Kitt Peak	Spacewatch	MAS	720 m	MPC · JPL
660131	1999 QV_{3}	—	August 21, 1999	Kitt Peak	Spacewatch	EOS	1.8 km	MPC · JPL
660132	1999 RV_{4}	—	September 3, 1999	Kitt Peak	Spacewatch	NYS	910 m	MPC · JPL
660133	1999 RN_{213}	—	September 13, 1999	Bergisch Gladbach	W. Bickel	TIR	2.6 km	MPC · JPL
660134	1999 RD_{217}	—	September 8, 1999	Kitt Peak	Spacewatch	EUN	1.4 km	MPC · JPL
660135	1999 RE_{217}	—	September 8, 1999	Kitt Peak	Spacewatch	·	1.5 km	MPC · JPL
660136	1999 RF_{244}	—	September 5, 1999	Kitt Peak	Spacewatch	·	2.4 km	MPC · JPL
660137	1999 RL_{251}	—	September 8, 1999	Kitt Peak	Spacewatch	EOS	1.7 km	MPC · JPL
660138	1999 RW_{259}	—	December 29, 2013	Catalina	CSS	·	1.6 km	MPC · JPL
660139	1999 RZ_{259}	—	April 20, 2014	Mount Lemmon	Mount Lemmon Survey	·	3.1 km	MPC · JPL
660140	1999 RB_{260}	—	October 21, 2016	Mount Lemmon	Mount Lemmon Survey	·	2.2 km	MPC · JPL
660141	1999 RY_{260}	—	June 27, 2011	Siding Spring	SSS	·	1.5 km	MPC · JPL
660142	1999 RA_{261}	—	October 7, 2013	Catalina	CSS	·	1.4 km	MPC · JPL
660143	1999 SN	—	September 16, 1999	Kitt Peak	Spacewatch	·	2.5 km	MPC · JPL
660144	1999 SK_{29}	—	August 20, 2017	Haleakala	Pan-STARRS 1	H	340 m	MPC · JPL
660145	1999 SL_{29}	—	October 20, 2008	Mount Lemmon	Mount Lemmon Survey	·	1.3 km	MPC · JPL
660146	1999 TL_{38}	—	October 1, 1999	Catalina	CSS	·	910 m	MPC · JPL
660147	1999 TH_{47}	—	October 4, 1999	Kitt Peak	Spacewatch	MAS	550 m	MPC · JPL
660148	1999 TU_{48}	—	October 4, 1999	Kitt Peak	Spacewatch	·	1.5 km	MPC · JPL
660149	1999 TV_{48}	—	October 4, 1999	Kitt Peak	Spacewatch	·	2.3 km	MPC · JPL
660150	1999 TS_{52}	—	October 5, 1999	Kitt Peak	Spacewatch	·	2.7 km	MPC · JPL
660151	1999 TJ_{68}	—	October 2, 1999	Kitt Peak	Spacewatch	TIR	1.9 km	MPC · JPL
660152	1999 TS_{69}	—	October 9, 1999	Kitt Peak	Spacewatch	·	640 m	MPC · JPL
660153	1999 TS_{74}	—	October 10, 1999	Kitt Peak	Spacewatch	·	1.6 km	MPC · JPL
660154	1999 TE_{83}	—	October 12, 1999	Kitt Peak	Spacewatch	·	1.2 km	MPC · JPL
660155	1999 TP_{83}	—	October 12, 1999	Kitt Peak	Spacewatch	·	2.6 km	MPC · JPL
660156	1999 TC_{84}	—	October 3, 1999	Kitt Peak	Spacewatch	·	1.5 km	MPC · JPL
660157	1999 TU_{84}	—	October 13, 1999	Kitt Peak	Spacewatch	·	740 m	MPC · JPL
660158	1999 TM_{195}	—	October 12, 1999	Socorro	LINEAR	·	1.6 km	MPC · JPL
660159	1999 TL_{225}	—	October 2, 1999	Kitt Peak	Spacewatch	·	1.3 km	MPC · JPL
660160	1999 TO_{255}	—	October 9, 1999	Kitt Peak	Spacewatch	·	1.6 km	MPC · JPL
660161	1999 TS_{276}	—	October 6, 1999	Socorro	LINEAR	·	1.9 km	MPC · JPL
660162	1999 TX_{301}	—	October 3, 1999	Kitt Peak	Spacewatch	·	1.7 km	MPC · JPL
660163	1999 TG_{305}	—	October 1, 1999	Kitt Peak	Spacewatch	·	2.3 km	MPC · JPL
660164	1999 TR_{316}	—	October 11, 1999	Kitt Peak	Spacewatch	·	1.5 km	MPC · JPL
660165	1999 TH_{337}	—	October 16, 2012	Mount Lemmon	Mount Lemmon Survey	·	1.6 km	MPC · JPL
660166	1999 TN_{337}	—	November 4, 1999	Kitt Peak	Spacewatch	(43176)	2.5 km	MPC · JPL
660167	1999 TP_{337}	—	November 20, 2004	Kitt Peak	Spacewatch	·	1.7 km	MPC · JPL
660168	1999 TR_{337}	—	March 4, 2013	Haleakala	Pan-STARRS 1	·	3.2 km	MPC · JPL
660169	1999 TT_{337}	—	March 25, 2014	Kitt Peak	Spacewatch	URS	3.3 km	MPC · JPL
660170	1999 TU_{337}	—	October 10, 2008	Mount Lemmon	Mount Lemmon Survey	·	1.5 km	MPC · JPL
660171	1999 TV_{337}	—	November 21, 2009	Mount Lemmon	Mount Lemmon Survey	·	1.9 km	MPC · JPL
660172	1999 TG_{338}	—	November 4, 1999	Kitt Peak	Spacewatch	·	1.5 km	MPC · JPL
660173	1999 TO_{338}	—	September 24, 2008	Kitt Peak	Spacewatch	·	1.6 km	MPC · JPL
660174	1999 TH_{339}	—	October 9, 2016	Haleakala	Pan-STARRS 1	·	2.7 km	MPC · JPL
660175	1999 TW_{339}	—	July 9, 2011	Črni Vrh	J. Skvarč, H. Mikuž	EUN	1.2 km	MPC · JPL
660176	1999 TJ_{340}	—	October 4, 2012	Nogales	M. Schwartz, P. R. Holvorcem	·	600 m	MPC · JPL
660177	1999 TR_{340}	—	June 7, 2013	Haleakala	Pan-STARRS 1	EOS	1.4 km	MPC · JPL
660178	1999 TY_{341}	—	November 4, 1999	Kitt Peak	Spacewatch	·	2.5 km	MPC · JPL
660179	1999 UF_{31}	—	October 31, 1999	Kitt Peak	Spacewatch	·	2.3 km	MPC · JPL
660180	1999 UD_{35}	—	October 31, 1999	Kitt Peak	Spacewatch	·	1.9 km	MPC · JPL
660181	1999 UT_{36}	—	October 10, 1999	Kitt Peak	Spacewatch	H	440 m	MPC · JPL
660182	1999 UY_{63}	—	October 19, 1999	Kitt Peak	Spacewatch	·	960 m	MPC · JPL
660183	1999 UL_{65}	—	September 5, 2008	Kitt Peak	Spacewatch	·	2.3 km	MPC · JPL
660184	1999 UQ_{65}	—	September 8, 2010	Kitt Peak	Spacewatch	·	980 m	MPC · JPL
660185	1999 UV_{66}	—	October 19, 1999	Kitt Peak	Spacewatch	EOS	1.6 km	MPC · JPL
660186	1999 VZ_{73}	—	November 1, 1999	Kitt Peak	Spacewatch	·	2.2 km	MPC · JPL
660187	1999 VY_{115}	—	October 17, 1999	Kitt Peak	Spacewatch	·	1.5 km	MPC · JPL
660188	1999 VX_{118}	—	November 3, 1999	Kitt Peak	Spacewatch	·	2.9 km	MPC · JPL
660189	1999 VM_{128}	—	October 29, 1999	Kitt Peak	Spacewatch	·	1.4 km	MPC · JPL
660190	1999 VB_{129}	—	November 10, 1999	Kitt Peak	Spacewatch	TIR	2.8 km	MPC · JPL
660191	1999 VF_{131}	—	November 9, 1999	Kitt Peak	Spacewatch	MAS	630 m	MPC · JPL
660192	1999 VP_{132}	—	November 9, 1999	Kitt Peak	Spacewatch	·	1.8 km	MPC · JPL
660193	1999 VF_{142}	—	November 10, 1999	Kitt Peak	Spacewatch	(5)	1.1 km	MPC · JPL
660194	1999 VO_{175}	—	November 11, 1999	Kitt Peak	Spacewatch	THB	2.5 km	MPC · JPL
660195	1999 VB_{232}	—	October 11, 2010	Kitt Peak	Spacewatch	VER	2.3 km	MPC · JPL
660196	1999 VE_{232}	—	November 30, 2011	Mount Lemmon	Mount Lemmon Survey	·	2.7 km	MPC · JPL
660197	1999 VK_{233}	—	September 19, 2015	Haleakala	Pan-STARRS 1	·	590 m	MPC · JPL
660198	1999 VM_{233}	—	April 28, 2008	Mount Lemmon	Mount Lemmon Survey	·	2.4 km	MPC · JPL
660199	1999 VQ_{233}	—	January 2, 2012	Kitt Peak	Spacewatch	MAS	560 m	MPC · JPL
660200	1999 VT_{233}	—	September 13, 2004	Kitt Peak	Spacewatch	·	2.4 km	MPC · JPL

== 660201–660300 ==
back to top

Designation			Discovery			Properties		Ref
Permanent	Provisional	Named after	Date	Site	Discoverer(s)	Category	Diam.	Ref
660201	1999 VU_{233}	—	November 22, 2015	Mount Lemmon	Mount Lemmon Survey	·	1.6 km	MPC · JPL
660202	1999 VV_{233}	—	October 3, 2010	Kitt Peak	Spacewatch	·	2.2 km	MPC · JPL
660203	1999 WJ_{22}	—	November 17, 1999	Kitt Peak	Spacewatch	MAS	580 m	MPC · JPL
660204	1999 XE_{124}	—	December 7, 1999	Catalina	CSS	·	700 m	MPC · JPL
660205	1999 XF_{150}	—	December 8, 1999	Kitt Peak	Spacewatch	·	1.7 km	MPC · JPL
660206	1999 XT_{244}	—	December 4, 1999	Kitt Peak	Spacewatch	·	1.3 km	MPC · JPL
660207	1999 XY_{265}	—	September 19, 2014	Haleakala	Pan-STARRS 1	·	1.1 km	MPC · JPL
660208	1999 XQ_{266}	—	October 2, 2010	Mount Lemmon	Mount Lemmon Survey	·	2.7 km	MPC · JPL
660209	1999 YS_{7}	—	December 27, 1999	Kitt Peak	Spacewatch	·	2.6 km	MPC · JPL
660210	1999 YM_{19}	—	December 29, 1999	Mauna Kea	Veillet, C.	KOR	1.1 km	MPC · JPL
660211	1999 YJ_{20}	—	December 30, 1999	Mauna Kea	Veillet, C.	AGN	1.1 km	MPC · JPL
660212	1999 YZ_{23}	—	December 16, 1999	Kitt Peak	Spacewatch	·	1.5 km	MPC · JPL
660213	1999 YL_{26}	—	April 6, 2008	Mount Lemmon	Mount Lemmon Survey	·	2.8 km	MPC · JPL
660214	1999 YB_{30}	—	October 15, 2012	Mount Lemmon	Mount Lemmon Survey	·	2.0 km	MPC · JPL
660215	1999 YJ_{30}	—	January 2, 2009	Kitt Peak	Spacewatch	·	1.0 km	MPC · JPL
660216	1999 YL_{30}	—	October 31, 2010	Piszkés-tető	K. Sárneczky, Z. Kuli	·	3.2 km	MPC · JPL
660217	2000 AA_{148}	—	January 5, 2000	Socorro	LINEAR	·	1.5 km	MPC · JPL
660218	2000 BC_{37}	—	January 30, 2000	Kitt Peak	Spacewatch	·	4.1 km	MPC · JPL
660219	2000 CH_{111}	—	February 11, 2000	Kitt Peak	Spacewatch	MAR	1.1 km	MPC · JPL
660220	2000 CB_{150}	—	April 4, 2011	Mount Lemmon	Mount Lemmon Survey	·	2.1 km	MPC · JPL
660221	2000 CV_{150}	—	February 5, 2000	Catalina	CSS	·	1.6 km	MPC · JPL
660222	2000 CP_{151}	—	January 29, 2016	Mount Lemmon	Mount Lemmon Survey	EOS	1.9 km	MPC · JPL
660223	2000 CS_{151}	—	July 13, 2013	Haleakala	Pan-STARRS 1	·	1.0 km	MPC · JPL
660224	2000 CF_{153}	—	October 10, 2007	Mount Lemmon	Mount Lemmon Survey	·	1.5 km	MPC · JPL
660225	2000 CO_{154}	—	August 15, 2014	Haleakala	Pan-STARRS 1	PHO	880 m	MPC · JPL
660226	2000 CU_{154}	—	September 16, 2017	Haleakala	Pan-STARRS 1	KOR	1.2 km	MPC · JPL
660227	2000 CO_{155}	—	January 2, 2009	Mount Lemmon	Mount Lemmon Survey	AGN	1.0 km	MPC · JPL
660228	2000 CB_{156}	—	October 24, 2003	Apache Point	SDSS Collaboration	·	1.5 km	MPC · JPL
660229	2000 DS_{2}	—	January 28, 2000	Kitt Peak	Spacewatch	·	1.9 km	MPC · JPL
660230	2000 ED_{7}	—	March 3, 2000	Kitt Peak	Spacewatch	·	3.0 km	MPC · JPL
660231	2000 EO_{54}	—	March 10, 2000	Kitt Peak	Spacewatch	·	500 m	MPC · JPL
660232	2000 EA_{203}	—	March 5, 2000	Cerro Tololo	Deep Lens Survey	·	2.7 km	MPC · JPL
660233	2000 ER_{203}	—	March 7, 2000	Cerro Tololo	Deep Lens Survey	·	1.1 km	MPC · JPL
660234	2000 EP_{210}	—	February 25, 2007	Kitt Peak	Spacewatch	·	800 m	MPC · JPL
660235	2000 EX_{210}	—	March 9, 2005	Mount Lemmon	Mount Lemmon Survey	·	1.7 km	MPC · JPL
660236	2000 EA_{211}	—	December 22, 2017	Haleakala	Pan-STARRS 1	H	380 m	MPC · JPL
660237	2000 GZ_{127}	—	April 3, 2000	Kitt Peak	Spacewatch	·	740 m	MPC · JPL
660238	2000 GC_{131}	—	April 7, 2000	Kitt Peak	Spacewatch	·	560 m	MPC · JPL
660239	2000 JR_{94}	—	August 8, 2005	Siding Spring	SSS	·	1.6 km	MPC · JPL
660240	2000 JZ_{94}	—	April 30, 2014	Haleakala	Pan-STARRS 1	·	670 m	MPC · JPL
660241	2000 JE_{95}	—	September 18, 2001	Apache Point	SDSS Collaboration	·	790 m	MPC · JPL
660242	2000 JX_{96}	—	October 6, 2008	Mount Lemmon	Mount Lemmon Survey	·	790 m	MPC · JPL
660243	2000 KP_{39}	—	May 24, 2000	Kitt Peak	Spacewatch	·	4.4 km	MPC · JPL
660244	2000 MQ_{7}	—	June 23, 2000	Kitt Peak	Spacewatch	·	2.9 km	MPC · JPL
660245	2000 MR_{7}	—	November 26, 2014	Haleakala	Pan-STARRS 1	·	4.1 km	MPC · JPL
660246	2000 NN_{7}	—	July 4, 2000	Kitt Peak	Spacewatch	·	1.7 km	MPC · JPL
660247	2000 NW_{29}	—	August 15, 2013	Haleakala	Pan-STARRS 1	·	1.1 km	MPC · JPL
660248	2000 NY_{29}	—	July 5, 2000	Kitt Peak	Spacewatch	·	1.0 km	MPC · JPL
660249	2000 OH_{62}	—	July 30, 2000	Cerro Tololo	Deep Ecliptic Survey	·	2.5 km	MPC · JPL
660250	2000 OB_{68}	—	August 1, 2000	Kitt Peak	Spacewatch	·	760 m	MPC · JPL
660251	2000 OZ_{69}	—	March 11, 2011	Mayhill	L. Elenin	·	1.3 km	MPC · JPL
660252	2000 OK_{70}	—	October 23, 2004	Kitt Peak	Spacewatch	·	960 m	MPC · JPL
660253	2000 OX_{70}	—	September 17, 2009	Kitt Peak	Spacewatch	·	1.1 km	MPC · JPL
660254	2000 OV_{72}	—	October 3, 2006	Mount Lemmon	Mount Lemmon Survey	·	1.6 km	MPC · JPL
660255	2000 PU_{32}	—	September 26, 2011	Haleakala	Pan-STARRS 1	·	850 m	MPC · JPL
660256	2000 PN_{33}	—	March 31, 2011	Haleakala	Pan-STARRS 1	·	790 m	MPC · JPL
660257	2000 PX_{33}	—	October 9, 2013	Mount Lemmon	Mount Lemmon Survey	·	1.0 km	MPC · JPL
660258	2000 PZ_{33}	—	November 7, 2015	Mount Lemmon	Mount Lemmon Survey	·	670 m	MPC · JPL
660259	2000 QT_{69}	—	August 30, 2000	Kitt Peak	Spacewatch	·	880 m	MPC · JPL
660260	2000 QV_{107}	—	August 7, 2000	Haleakala	NEAT	(5)	1.0 km	MPC · JPL
660261	2000 QF_{144}	—	August 31, 2000	Socorro	LINEAR	·	1.4 km	MPC · JPL
660262	2000 QB_{148}	—	August 31, 2000	Socorro	LINEAR	(116763)	1.3 km	MPC · JPL
660263	2000 QM_{174}	—	August 31, 2000	Socorro	LINEAR	V	770 m	MPC · JPL
660264	2000 QG_{255}	—	August 7, 2004	Palomar	NEAT	(5)	1.1 km	MPC · JPL
660265	2000 QJ_{256}	—	August 25, 2000	Cerro Tololo	Deep Ecliptic Survey	·	480 m	MPC · JPL
660266	2000 QT_{256}	—	September 10, 2013	Haleakala	Pan-STARRS 1	·	1.1 km	MPC · JPL
660267	2000 QV_{258}	—	February 25, 2014	Haleakala	Pan-STARRS 1	·	1.9 km	MPC · JPL
660268	2000 QN_{261}	—	August 28, 2000	Cerro Tololo	Deep Ecliptic Survey	·	2.1 km	MPC · JPL
660269	2000 RP_{58}	—	September 7, 2000	Kitt Peak	Spacewatch	·	1.2 km	MPC · JPL
660270	2000 RN_{108}	—	September 5, 2000	Apache Point	SDSS Collaboration	·	1.6 km	MPC · JPL
660271	2000 RM_{110}	—	March 15, 2016	Haleakala	Pan-STARRS 1	·	1.1 km	MPC · JPL
660272	2000 RP_{111}	—	August 15, 2013	Haleakala	Pan-STARRS 1	·	1.3 km	MPC · JPL
660273	2000 RQ_{111}	—	January 8, 2011	Mount Lemmon	Mount Lemmon Survey	·	740 m	MPC · JPL
660274	2000 SO_{4}	—	September 22, 2000	Kitt Peak	Spacewatch	·	3.4 km	MPC · JPL
660275	2000 ST_{7}	—	September 22, 2000	Kitt Peak	Spacewatch	·	870 m	MPC · JPL
660276	2000 SS_{51}	—	September 23, 2000	Socorro	LINEAR	·	1.3 km	MPC · JPL
660277	2000 SU_{55}	—	September 24, 2000	Socorro	LINEAR	·	1.2 km	MPC · JPL
660278	2000 SN_{131}	—	September 6, 2000	Socorro	LINEAR	·	2.7 km	MPC · JPL
660279	2000 SC_{190}	—	September 23, 2000	Kitt Peak	Spacewatch	·	1.5 km	MPC · JPL
660280	2000 SZ_{193}	—	July 29, 2000	Lake Tekapo	I. P. Griffin	·	1.2 km	MPC · JPL
660281	2000 SZ_{243}	—	August 28, 2000	Socorro	LINEAR	(1547)	1.6 km	MPC · JPL
660282	2000 SM_{290}	—	September 27, 2000	Socorro	LINEAR	·	1.2 km	MPC · JPL
660283	2000 SV_{323}	—	September 28, 2000	Kitt Peak	Spacewatch	·	1.1 km	MPC · JPL
660284	2000 SP_{355}	—	October 1, 2000	Socorro	LINEAR	·	1.5 km	MPC · JPL
660285	2000 SC_{365}	—	September 24, 2000	Socorro	LINEAR	·	990 m	MPC · JPL
660286	2000 SH_{379}	—	October 12, 2013	Kitt Peak	Spacewatch	MIS	2.3 km	MPC · JPL
660287	2000 SM_{379}	—	February 1, 2005	Kitt Peak	Spacewatch	·	630 m	MPC · JPL
660288	2000 SE_{380}	—	June 21, 2010	Mount Lemmon	Mount Lemmon Survey	EOS	1.5 km	MPC · JPL
660289	2000 SX_{380}	—	December 13, 2010	Mount Lemmon	Mount Lemmon Survey	·	370 m	MPC · JPL
660290	2000 SS_{382}	—	January 27, 2006	Mount Lemmon	Mount Lemmon Survey	·	900 m	MPC · JPL
660291	2000 SX_{382}	—	March 21, 2017	Mount Lemmon	Mount Lemmon Survey	·	2.1 km	MPC · JPL
660292	2000 SA_{383}	—	September 21, 2011	Kitt Peak	Spacewatch	·	860 m	MPC · JPL
660293	2000 SU_{385}	—	August 23, 2011	Haleakala	Pan-STARRS 1	·	1.0 km	MPC · JPL
660294	2000 SO_{386}	—	August 23, 2011	Haleakala	Pan-STARRS 1	NYS	820 m	MPC · JPL
660295	2000 SA_{387}	—	September 27, 2000	Kitt Peak	Spacewatch	EUP	2.2 km	MPC · JPL
660296	2000 TM_{42}	—	October 1, 2000	Socorro	LINEAR	·	1.6 km	MPC · JPL
660297	2000 TP_{75}	—	April 3, 2002	Kvistaberg	Uppsala-DLR Asteroid Survey	·	2.5 km	MPC · JPL
660298	2000 TY_{76}	—	March 14, 2007	Kitt Peak	Spacewatch	·	1.2 km	MPC · JPL
660299	2000 TH_{77}	—	August 5, 2013	Piszkéstető	K. Sárneczky	·	1.3 km	MPC · JPL
660300	2000 TF_{82}	—	October 2, 2000	Kitt Peak	Spacewatch	·	1.8 km	MPC · JPL

== 660301–660400 ==
back to top

Designation			Discovery			Properties		Ref
Permanent	Provisional	Named after	Date	Site	Discoverer(s)	Category	Diam.	Ref
660301	2000 UF_{115}	—	January 23, 2006	Kitt Peak	Spacewatch	(5)	1.4 km	MPC · JPL
660302	2000 UL_{115}	—	January 3, 2009	Mount Lemmon	Mount Lemmon Survey	·	880 m	MPC · JPL
660303	2000 UX_{115}	—	October 26, 2016	Mount Lemmon	Mount Lemmon Survey	·	640 m	MPC · JPL
660304	2000 UN_{116}	—	May 20, 2014	Haleakala	Pan-STARRS 1	EOS	1.5 km	MPC · JPL
660305	2000 WT_{198}	—	November 29, 2000	Kitt Peak	Spacewatch	·	1.6 km	MPC · JPL
660306	2000 WD_{200}	—	July 28, 2008	Mount Lemmon	Mount Lemmon Survey	·	1.8 km	MPC · JPL
660307	2000 WO_{200}	—	November 22, 2006	Catalina	CSS	TIR	2.4 km	MPC · JPL
660308	2000 WU_{200}	—	May 13, 2012	Mount Lemmon	Mount Lemmon Survey	·	1.3 km	MPC · JPL
660309	2000 WL_{201}	—	May 20, 2014	Haleakala	Pan-STARRS 1	EOS	1.6 km	MPC · JPL
660310	2000 WO_{201}	—	May 21, 2012	Haleakala	Pan-STARRS 1	·	1.2 km	MPC · JPL
660311	2000 WR_{202}	—	October 7, 2016	Haleakala	Pan-STARRS 1	·	2.1 km	MPC · JPL
660312	2000 WB_{203}	—	October 30, 2009	Mount Lemmon	Mount Lemmon Survey	EUN	1.1 km	MPC · JPL
660313	2000 WT_{203}	—	January 26, 2014	Haleakala	Pan-STARRS 1	(5)	1.0 km	MPC · JPL
660314	2000 WV_{203}	—	March 8, 2008	Mount Lemmon	Mount Lemmon Survey	EOS	1.8 km	MPC · JPL
660315	2000 WL_{204}	—	January 26, 2015	Haleakala	Pan-STARRS 1	EUN	860 m	MPC · JPL
660316	2000 YR_{20}	—	December 28, 2000	Kitt Peak	Spacewatch	·	1.2 km	MPC · JPL
660317	2000 YN_{25}	—	December 29, 2000	Kitt Peak	Spacewatch	·	1.7 km	MPC · JPL
660318	2000 YV_{140}	—	December 19, 2000	Kitt Peak	Deep Lens Survey	·	2.7 km	MPC · JPL
660319	2000 YT_{144}	—	October 9, 2016	Haleakala	Pan-STARRS 1	·	2.6 km	MPC · JPL
660320	2000 YW_{145}	—	December 26, 2017	Mount Lemmon	Mount Lemmon Survey	EOS	1.6 km	MPC · JPL
660321	2000 YX_{145}	—	May 28, 2014	Haleakala	Pan-STARRS 1	EOS	1.6 km	MPC · JPL
660322	2001 AS_{54}	—	November 18, 2015	Haleakala	Pan-STARRS 1	PHO	700 m	MPC · JPL
660323	2001 BM_{83}	—	October 27, 2005	Kitt Peak	Spacewatch	·	2.3 km	MPC · JPL
660324	2001 BW_{84}	—	November 1, 2005	Mount Lemmon	Mount Lemmon Survey	·	2.6 km	MPC · JPL
660325	2001 DK_{77}	—	February 16, 2001	Kitt Peak	Spacewatch	·	570 m	MPC · JPL
660326	2001 DU_{112}	—	October 2, 2006	Mount Lemmon	Mount Lemmon Survey	·	870 m	MPC · JPL
660327	2001 DT_{113}	—	October 10, 2008	Kitt Peak	Spacewatch	·	1.4 km	MPC · JPL
660328	2001 DU_{113}	—	September 25, 2008	Kitt Peak	Spacewatch	AGN	950 m	MPC · JPL
660329	2001 DF_{115}	—	April 18, 2012	Mount Lemmon	Mount Lemmon Survey	·	1.6 km	MPC · JPL
660330	2001 DU_{116}	—	January 16, 2018	Haleakala	Pan-STARRS 1	·	2.9 km	MPC · JPL
660331	2001 DX_{116}	—	September 30, 2009	Mount Lemmon	Mount Lemmon Survey	·	650 m	MPC · JPL
660332	2001 DE_{117}	—	November 11, 2013	Mount Lemmon	Mount Lemmon Survey	GEF	870 m	MPC · JPL
660333	2001 DF_{118}	—	September 2, 2014	Haleakala	Pan-STARRS 1	·	2.2 km	MPC · JPL
660334	2001 DB_{119}	—	November 2, 2013	Kitt Peak	Spacewatch	·	1.2 km	MPC · JPL
660335	2001 EX_{27}	—	December 29, 2008	Mount Lemmon	Mount Lemmon Survey	·	1.1 km	MPC · JPL
660336	2001 EY_{27}	—	March 15, 2012	Catalina	CSS	T_{j} (2.99)	3.1 km	MPC · JPL
660337	2001 FL_{140}	—	March 21, 2001	Haleakala	NEAT	·	1.3 km	MPC · JPL
660338	2001 FP_{183}	—	March 26, 2001	Kitt Peak	Spacewatch	MRX	970 m	MPC · JPL
660339	2001 FZ_{196}	—	March 20, 2001	Haleakala	NEAT	·	2.1 km	MPC · JPL
660340	2001 FX_{208}	—	September 25, 2006	Mount Lemmon	Mount Lemmon Survey	·	1.1 km	MPC · JPL
660341	2001 FN_{211}	—	March 21, 2001	Kitt Peak	SKADS	·	2.4 km	MPC · JPL
660342	2001 FV_{211}	—	March 21, 2001	Kitt Peak	SKADS	AGN	930 m	MPC · JPL
660343	2001 FF_{231}	—	March 29, 2001	Kitt Peak	SKADS	·	2.2 km	MPC · JPL
660344	2001 FX_{243}	—	December 6, 2008	Kitt Peak	Spacewatch	·	2.4 km	MPC · JPL
660345	2001 GA_{12}	—	February 20, 2014	Mount Lemmon	Mount Lemmon Survey	·	650 m	MPC · JPL
660346	2001 HJ_{70}	—	July 23, 2015	Haleakala	Pan-STARRS 1	·	610 m	MPC · JPL
660347	2001 HV_{70}	—	October 20, 2003	Kitt Peak	Spacewatch	EOS	1.6 km	MPC · JPL
660348	2001 KB_{10}	—	May 18, 2001	Socorro	LINEAR	·	720 m	MPC · JPL
660349	2001 KU_{79}	—	November 16, 2003	Kitt Peak	Spacewatch	ADE	2.1 km	MPC · JPL
660350	2001 KN_{80}	—	March 14, 2010	Mount Lemmon	Mount Lemmon Survey	·	1.6 km	MPC · JPL
660351	2001 KE_{81}	—	December 4, 2007	Kitt Peak	Spacewatch	·	1.2 km	MPC · JPL
660352	2001 KM_{82}	—	May 22, 2015	Haleakala	Pan-STARRS 1	·	1.8 km	MPC · JPL
660353	2001 KN_{82}	—	April 29, 2011	Kitt Peak	Spacewatch	·	520 m	MPC · JPL
660354	2001 KU_{83}	—	March 4, 2008	Kitt Peak	Spacewatch	·	1.0 km	MPC · JPL
660355	2001 KX_{83}	—	November 19, 2003	Anderson Mesa	LONEOS	EOS	2.2 km	MPC · JPL
660356	2001 KA_{84}	—	October 27, 2009	Kitt Peak	Spacewatch	·	690 m	MPC · JPL
660357	2001 KL_{84}	—	January 31, 2017	Mount Lemmon	Mount Lemmon Survey	·	590 m	MPC · JPL
660358	2001 KM_{84}	—	November 8, 2007	Mount Lemmon	Mount Lemmon Survey	·	2.0 km	MPC · JPL
660359	2001 KR_{84}	—	September 1, 2017	Haleakala	Pan-STARRS 1	H	370 m	MPC · JPL
660360	2001 KP_{85}	—	October 24, 2015	Mount Lemmon	Mount Lemmon Survey	·	880 m	MPC · JPL
660361	2001 KC_{88}	—	October 9, 2009	Kitt Peak	Spacewatch	VER	2.4 km	MPC · JPL
660362	2001 LL_{20}	—	November 3, 2007	Mount Lemmon	Mount Lemmon Survey	·	1.8 km	MPC · JPL
660363	2001 LN_{20}	—	November 24, 2013	Haleakala	Pan-STARRS 1	·	2.2 km	MPC · JPL
660364	2001 NW_{1}	—	July 9, 2001	Palomar	NEAT	·	1.5 km	MPC · JPL
660365	2001 NJ_{2}	—	June 26, 2001	Palomar	NEAT	·	590 m	MPC · JPL
660366	2001 NE_{23}	—	July 29, 2009	Kitt Peak	Spacewatch	·	1.3 km	MPC · JPL
660367	2001 OQ_{78}	—	July 26, 2001	Palomar	NEAT	TIN	950 m	MPC · JPL
660368	2001 OV_{114}	—	July 27, 2001	Anderson Mesa	LONEOS	(5)	1.1 km	MPC · JPL
660369	2001 OF_{115}	—	November 15, 2010	Catalina	CSS	T_{j} (2.94)	4.6 km	MPC · JPL
660370	2001 PO_{13}	—	August 11, 2001	Haleakala	NEAT	·	450 m	MPC · JPL
660371	2001 PR_{15}	—	August 9, 2001	Palomar	NEAT	·	910 m	MPC · JPL
660372	2001 PT_{42}	—	August 12, 2001	Palomar	NEAT	·	2.1 km	MPC · JPL
660373	2001 PA_{48}	—	August 14, 2001	Palomar	NEAT	·	790 m	MPC · JPL
660374	2001 PF_{52}	—	August 15, 2001	Haleakala	NEAT	·	930 m	MPC · JPL
660375	2001 PW_{67}	—	August 12, 2001	Haleakala	NEAT	·	690 m	MPC · JPL
660376	2001 PC_{68}	—	November 6, 2010	Mount Lemmon	Mount Lemmon Survey	EUN	1 km	MPC · JPL
660377	2001 PG_{68}	—	August 14, 2001	Haleakala	NEAT	·	1.2 km	MPC · JPL
660378	2001 QO_{85}	—	August 19, 2001	Socorro	LINEAR	·	2.1 km	MPC · JPL
660379	2001 QR_{92}	—	August 22, 2001	Socorro	LINEAR	PHO	860 m	MPC · JPL
660380	2001 QP_{127}	—	August 20, 2001	Socorro	LINEAR	·	720 m	MPC · JPL
660381	2001 QF_{136}	—	August 16, 2001	Palomar	NEAT	·	570 m	MPC · JPL
660382	2001 QZ_{152}	—	August 27, 2001	Ondřejov	P. Kušnirák	·	1.0 km	MPC · JPL
660383	2001 QV_{153}	—	August 25, 2001	Socorro	LINEAR	·	1.1 km	MPC · JPL
660384	2001 QD_{172}	—	August 25, 2001	Socorro	LINEAR	·	760 m	MPC · JPL
660385	2001 QK_{195}	—	August 22, 2001	Socorro	LINEAR	·	1.2 km	MPC · JPL
660386	2001 QR_{209}	—	August 23, 2001	Anderson Mesa	LONEOS	·	620 m	MPC · JPL
660387	2001 QJ_{279}	—	July 31, 2001	Palomar	NEAT	PHO	890 m	MPC · JPL
660388	2001 QB_{306}	—	August 19, 2001	Cerro Tololo	Deep Ecliptic Survey	BRG	970 m	MPC · JPL
660389	2001 QN_{308}	—	August 19, 2001	Cerro Tololo	Deep Ecliptic Survey	·	2.9 km	MPC · JPL
660390	2001 QK_{310}	—	August 19, 2001	Cerro Tololo	Deep Ecliptic Survey	(5)	860 m	MPC · JPL
660391	2001 QB_{322}	—	August 20, 2001	Cerro Tololo	Deep Ecliptic Survey	·	690 m	MPC · JPL
660392	2001 QV_{331}	—	August 23, 2001	La Palma	D. Davis, Howell, S.	(194)	1.3 km	MPC · JPL
660393	2001 QK_{337}	—	April 4, 2014	Mount Lemmon	Mount Lemmon Survey	·	2.1 km	MPC · JPL
660394	2001 QQ_{337}	—	November 17, 2014	Haleakala	Pan-STARRS 1	BRG	1.2 km	MPC · JPL
660395	2001 QU_{338}	—	August 28, 2015	Haleakala	Pan-STARRS 1	·	700 m	MPC · JPL
660396	2001 RN_{47}	—	July 23, 2001	Palomar	NEAT	H	530 m	MPC · JPL
660397	2001 RX_{61}	—	September 12, 2001	Socorro	LINEAR	·	1.3 km	MPC · JPL
660398	2001 RL_{95}	—	July 20, 2001	Anderson Mesa	LONEOS	·	880 m	MPC · JPL
660399	2001 RA_{102}	—	August 23, 2001	Anderson Mesa	LONEOS	·	1.3 km	MPC · JPL
660400	2001 RS_{122}	—	September 12, 2001	Socorro	LINEAR	·	970 m	MPC · JPL

== 660401–660500 ==
back to top

Designation			Discovery			Properties		Ref
Permanent	Provisional	Named after	Date	Site	Discoverer(s)	Category	Diam.	Ref
660401	2001 RV_{156}	—	January 27, 2009	XuYi	PMO NEO Survey Program	·	2.7 km	MPC · JPL
660402	2001 SZ_{4}	—	September 17, 2001	Socorro	LINEAR	BAR	1.1 km	MPC · JPL
660403	2001 SR_{6}	—	September 18, 2001	Kitt Peak	Spacewatch	·	1.0 km	MPC · JPL
660404	2001 SP_{11}	—	September 16, 2001	Socorro	LINEAR	·	1.1 km	MPC · JPL
660405	2001 SB_{23}	—	September 16, 2001	Socorro	LINEAR	·	550 m	MPC · JPL
660406	2001 SO_{32}	—	September 16, 2001	Socorro	LINEAR	·	1.1 km	MPC · JPL
660407	2001 SK_{42}	—	September 16, 2001	Socorro	LINEAR	·	1.2 km	MPC · JPL
660408	2001 SL_{78}	—	August 25, 2001	Kitt Peak	Spacewatch	·	970 m	MPC · JPL
660409	2001 SD_{89}	—	September 20, 2001	Socorro	LINEAR	·	620 m	MPC · JPL
660410	2001 SG_{100}	—	September 20, 2001	Socorro	LINEAR	·	1.3 km	MPC · JPL
660411	2001 SD_{182}	—	September 19, 2001	Socorro	LINEAR	(1547)	1.3 km	MPC · JPL
660412	2001 SF_{193}	—	September 19, 2001	Socorro	LINEAR	VER	2.7 km	MPC · JPL
660413	2001 ST_{206}	—	September 14, 2001	Palomar	NEAT	·	2.0 km	MPC · JPL
660414	2001 SX_{211}	—	September 19, 2001	Socorro	LINEAR	·	1.1 km	MPC · JPL
660415	2001 SE_{216}	—	September 19, 2001	Socorro	LINEAR	·	1.2 km	MPC · JPL
660416	2001 SX_{299}	—	September 20, 2001	Socorro	LINEAR	·	1.1 km	MPC · JPL
660417	2001 SY_{300}	—	September 20, 2001	Socorro	LINEAR	·	2.2 km	MPC · JPL
660418	2001 SB_{313}	—	September 21, 2001	Socorro	LINEAR	·	1.9 km	MPC · JPL
660419	2001 SA_{322}	—	September 25, 2001	Socorro	LINEAR	·	1.0 km	MPC · JPL
660420	2001 SV_{322}	—	September 25, 2001	Socorro	LINEAR	V	560 m	MPC · JPL
660421	2001 SJ_{346}	—	September 25, 2001	Socorro	LINEAR	·	1.3 km	MPC · JPL
660422	2001 SW_{355}	—	September 26, 2006	Mount Lemmon	Mount Lemmon Survey	EOS	1.8 km	MPC · JPL
660423	2001 SU_{356}	—	October 8, 2001	Palomar	NEAT	·	540 m	MPC · JPL
660424	2001 SY_{356}	—	October 16, 2001	Palomar	NEAT	·	630 m	MPC · JPL
660425	2001 SG_{357}	—	January 10, 2013	Mount Lemmon	Mount Lemmon Survey	·	1.7 km	MPC · JPL
660426	2001 SH_{359}	—	November 21, 2014	Haleakala	Pan-STARRS 1	·	1.0 km	MPC · JPL
660427	2001 SL_{359}	—	August 17, 2009	Catalina	CSS	·	810 m	MPC · JPL
660428	2001 SJ_{360}	—	September 30, 2001	Palomar	NEAT	·	2.2 km	MPC · JPL
660429	2001 SY_{360}	—	November 18, 2006	Mount Lemmon	Mount Lemmon Survey	EUN	1.1 km	MPC · JPL
660430	2001 SP_{363}	—	September 19, 2001	Kitt Peak	Spacewatch	·	540 m	MPC · JPL
660431	2001 SA_{364}	—	December 29, 2014	Haleakala	Pan-STARRS 1	·	1 km	MPC · JPL
660432	2001 TQ	—	October 7, 2001	Palomar	NEAT	PHO	700 m	MPC · JPL
660433	2001 TK_{13}	—	September 28, 2001	Palomar	NEAT	H	510 m	MPC · JPL
660434	2001 TT_{60}	—	October 11, 2001	Palomar	NEAT	·	1.2 km	MPC · JPL
660435	2001 TG_{118}	—	October 15, 2001	Socorro	LINEAR	·	1.4 km	MPC · JPL
660436	2001 TN_{146}	—	October 10, 2001	Palomar	NEAT	·	1.4 km	MPC · JPL
660437	2001 TZ_{174}	—	October 15, 2001	Socorro	LINEAR	·	3.1 km	MPC · JPL
660438	2001 TT_{181}	—	October 14, 2001	Socorro	LINEAR	PHO	780 m	MPC · JPL
660439	2001 TV_{184}	—	October 14, 2001	Socorro	LINEAR	NYS	1.0 km	MPC · JPL
660440	2001 TG_{205}	—	October 11, 2001	Socorro	LINEAR	V	700 m	MPC · JPL
660441	2001 TR_{205}	—	October 8, 2001	Palomar	NEAT	·	1.1 km	MPC · JPL
660442	2001 TH_{216}	—	October 13, 2001	Palomar	NEAT	·	1.7 km	MPC · JPL
660443	2001 TW_{220}	—	October 14, 2001	Socorro	LINEAR	·	1.4 km	MPC · JPL
660444	2001 TK_{223}	—	October 14, 2001	Socorro	LINEAR	·	1.7 km	MPC · JPL
660445	2001 TY_{234}	—	October 15, 2001	Kitt Peak	Spacewatch	·	2.2 km	MPC · JPL
660446	2001 TG_{242}	—	October 6, 2001	La Silla	Barbieri, C.	KOR	1.2 km	MPC · JPL
660447	2001 TP_{262}	—	September 23, 2001	Palomar	NEAT	·	1.2 km	MPC · JPL
660448	2001 TX_{262}	—	September 28, 2001	Palomar	NEAT	·	1.2 km	MPC · JPL
660449	2001 TU_{263}	—	October 21, 2006	Kitt Peak	Spacewatch	·	1.7 km	MPC · JPL
660450	2001 TK_{264}	—	October 13, 2010	Mount Lemmon	Mount Lemmon Survey	·	2.0 km	MPC · JPL
660451	2001 TP_{264}	—	September 12, 2007	Mount Lemmon	Mount Lemmon Survey	·	2.8 km	MPC · JPL
660452	2001 TV_{264}	—	March 15, 2007	Mount Lemmon	Mount Lemmon Survey	V	620 m	MPC · JPL
660453	2001 TE_{265}	—	September 21, 2008	Kitt Peak	Spacewatch	·	700 m	MPC · JPL
660454	2001 TC_{266}	—	November 30, 2014	Kitt Peak	Spacewatch	ADE	2.2 km	MPC · JPL
660455	2001 TK_{266}	—	October 14, 2001	Anderson Mesa	LONEOS	·	1.3 km	MPC · JPL
660456	2001 TY_{266}	—	June 7, 2013	Haleakala	Pan-STARRS 1	·	1.3 km	MPC · JPL
660457	2001 TJ_{268}	—	February 3, 2017	Haleakala	Pan-STARRS 1	·	580 m	MPC · JPL
660458	2001 TO_{268}	—	August 26, 2016	Haleakala	Pan-STARRS 1	·	2.3 km	MPC · JPL
660459	2001 TS_{268}	—	March 10, 2008	Mount Lemmon	Mount Lemmon Survey	L5	7.6 km	MPC · JPL
660460	2001 UT_{18}	—	September 12, 2001	Socorro	LINEAR	·	1.0 km	MPC · JPL
660461	2001 UP_{20}	—	October 17, 2001	Socorro	LINEAR	·	1.2 km	MPC · JPL
660462	2001 UG_{43}	—	October 17, 2001	Socorro	LINEAR	·	1.2 km	MPC · JPL
660463	2001 UX_{67}	—	October 20, 2001	Socorro	LINEAR	·	840 m	MPC · JPL
660464	2001 UF_{94}	—	October 23, 2001	Palomar	NEAT	·	900 m	MPC · JPL
660465	2001 UU_{146}	—	October 13, 2001	Kitt Peak	Spacewatch	·	1 km	MPC · JPL
660466	2001 UK_{148}	—	October 11, 2001	Kitt Peak	Spacewatch	·	1.7 km	MPC · JPL
660467	2001 UG_{156}	—	October 23, 2001	Socorro	LINEAR	(1547)	1.2 km	MPC · JPL
660468	2001 UP_{164}	—	October 19, 2001	Palomar	NEAT	·	670 m	MPC · JPL
660469	2001 UN_{197}	—	October 21, 2001	Socorro	LINEAR	GEF	1.1 km	MPC · JPL
660470	2001 UC_{198}	—	September 20, 2001	Kitt Peak	Spacewatch	·	930 m	MPC · JPL
660471	2001 UM_{209}	—	September 28, 2001	Palomar	NEAT	·	810 m	MPC · JPL
660472	2001 UT_{226}	—	September 18, 2001	Apache Point	SDSS Collaboration	·	2.0 km	MPC · JPL
660473	2001 UP_{227}	—	October 16, 2001	Palomar	NEAT	·	1.2 km	MPC · JPL
660474	2001 US_{230}	—	October 25, 2001	Apache Point	SDSS Collaboration	·	1.4 km	MPC · JPL
660475	2001 UH_{233}	—	December 9, 2012	Mount Lemmon	Mount Lemmon Survey	·	1.0 km	MPC · JPL
660476	2001 US_{234}	—	July 14, 2015	Haleakala	Pan-STARRS 1	·	890 m	MPC · JPL
660477	2001 UW_{235}	—	September 28, 2008	Mount Lemmon	Mount Lemmon Survey	·	840 m	MPC · JPL
660478	2001 UK_{237}	—	December 14, 2015	Haleakala	Pan-STARRS 1	·	680 m	MPC · JPL
660479	2001 UC_{239}	—	October 12, 2005	Anderson Mesa	LONEOS	·	2.0 km	MPC · JPL
660480	2001 UE_{240}	—	April 11, 2008	Mount Lemmon	Mount Lemmon Survey	L5	8.1 km	MPC · JPL
660481	2001 UF_{240}	—	October 25, 2001	Apache Point	SDSS Collaboration	V	590 m	MPC · JPL
660482	2001 VG_{3}	—	November 9, 2001	Kitt Peak	Spacewatch	EOS	1.6 km	MPC · JPL
660483	2001 VC_{76}	—	November 14, 2001	Kitt Peak	Spacewatch	APO	390 m	MPC · JPL
660484	2001 VL_{133}	—	November 11, 2001	Apache Point	SDSS Collaboration	·	760 m	MPC · JPL
660485	2001 VM_{136}	—	November 12, 2001	Apache Point	SDSS Collaboration	·	1.1 km	MPC · JPL
660486	2001 VR_{137}	—	November 12, 2001	Apache Point	SDSS Collaboration	·	2.1 km	MPC · JPL
660487	2001 WA_{7}	—	October 25, 2001	Palomar	NEAT	·	1.1 km	MPC · JPL
660488	2001 WC_{24}	—	November 17, 2001	Kitt Peak	Spacewatch	(194)	1.8 km	MPC · JPL
660489	2001 WV_{43}	—	November 18, 2001	Socorro	LINEAR	·	1.3 km	MPC · JPL
660490	2001 WD_{64}	—	November 19, 2001	Socorro	LINEAR	·	1.2 km	MPC · JPL
660491	2001 WT_{93}	—	October 10, 2001	Kitt Peak	Spacewatch	·	1.0 km	MPC · JPL
660492	2001 WO_{105}	—	October 22, 2008	Kitt Peak	Spacewatch	·	730 m	MPC · JPL
660493	2001 WD_{106}	—	November 17, 2001	Kitt Peak	Spacewatch	·	1.6 km	MPC · JPL
660494	2001 WP_{107}	—	November 19, 2001	Haleakala	NEAT	·	1.4 km	MPC · JPL
660495	2001 XM_{34}	—	December 9, 2001	Socorro	LINEAR	·	1.8 km	MPC · JPL
660496	2001 XC_{76}	—	December 11, 2001	Socorro	LINEAR	(1547)	1.5 km	MPC · JPL
660497	2001 XK_{79}	—	December 11, 2001	Socorro	LINEAR	·	1.7 km	MPC · JPL
660498	2001 XF_{91}	—	November 11, 2001	Socorro	LINEAR	·	1.3 km	MPC · JPL
660499	2001 XE_{92}	—	November 20, 2001	Socorro	LINEAR	·	2.4 km	MPC · JPL
660500	2001 XB_{122}	—	November 18, 2001	Socorro	LINEAR	·	930 m	MPC · JPL

== 660501–660600 ==
back to top

Designation			Discovery			Properties		Ref
Permanent	Provisional	Named after	Date	Site	Discoverer(s)	Category	Diam.	Ref
660501	2001 XB_{127}	—	December 14, 2001	Socorro	LINEAR	·	1.4 km	MPC · JPL
660502	2001 XW_{242}	—	December 14, 2001	Socorro	LINEAR	·	1.9 km	MPC · JPL
660503	2001 XB_{268}	—	January 27, 2012	Mount Lemmon	Mount Lemmon Survey	·	590 m	MPC · JPL
660504	2001 XF_{268}	—	September 24, 2011	Mount Lemmon	Mount Lemmon Survey	·	590 m	MPC · JPL
660505	2001 XJ_{268}	—	February 8, 2008	Kitt Peak	Spacewatch	·	1.9 km	MPC · JPL
660506	2001 XX_{268}	—	December 15, 2001	Apache Point	SDSS Collaboration	·	1.1 km	MPC · JPL
660507	2001 YQ_{25}	—	November 18, 2001	Kitt Peak	Spacewatch	·	2.1 km	MPC · JPL
660508	2001 YP_{45}	—	December 14, 2001	Kitt Peak	Spacewatch	·	850 m	MPC · JPL
660509	2001 YU_{48}	—	December 18, 2001	Socorro	LINEAR	·	1.1 km	MPC · JPL
660510	2001 YF_{89}	—	December 18, 2001	Socorro	LINEAR	T_{j} (2.99)	3.4 km	MPC · JPL
660511	2001 YB_{141}	—	November 16, 2001	Kitt Peak	Spacewatch	·	1.0 km	MPC · JPL
660512	2001 YC_{163}	—	May 26, 2007	Mount Lemmon	Mount Lemmon Survey	·	660 m	MPC · JPL
660513	2001 YV_{164}	—	April 6, 2008	Catalina	CSS	EOS	1.8 km	MPC · JPL
660514	2001 YZ_{164}	—	May 21, 2017	Haleakala	Pan-STARRS 1	EUN	1.1 km	MPC · JPL
660515	2002 AN_{14}	—	January 11, 2002	Piszkéstető	K. Sárneczky, Z. Heiner	BRG	1.0 km	MPC · JPL
660516	2002 AZ_{66}	—	January 13, 2002	Piszkéstető	K. Sárneczky, Z. Heiner	·	600 m	MPC · JPL
660517	2002 AC_{68}	—	January 9, 2002	Kitt Peak	Spacewatch	·	1.1 km	MPC · JPL
660518	2002 AH_{93}	—	January 13, 2002	Desert Eagle	W. K. Y. Yeung	·	1.1 km	MPC · JPL
660519	2002 AR_{145}	—	December 14, 2001	Kitt Peak	Spacewatch	·	1.7 km	MPC · JPL
660520	2002 AC_{173}	—	January 14, 2002	Socorro	LINEAR	MAS	660 m	MPC · JPL
660521	2002 AX_{175}	—	January 7, 2002	Kitt Peak	Spacewatch	·	2.6 km	MPC · JPL
660522	2002 AU_{204}	—	February 6, 2002	Kitt Peak	Spacewatch	·	860 m	MPC · JPL
660523	2002 AZ_{210}	—	October 28, 2011	Mount Lemmon	Mount Lemmon Survey	·	2.7 km	MPC · JPL
660524	2002 AE_{212}	—	September 23, 2011	Haleakala	Pan-STARRS 1	THM	1.8 km	MPC · JPL
660525	2002 AW_{212}	—	February 17, 2013	Catalina	CSS	·	2.6 km	MPC · JPL
660526	2002 AL_{214}	—	November 10, 2013	Mount Lemmon	Mount Lemmon Survey	·	1.1 km	MPC · JPL
660527	2002 AT_{214}	—	February 4, 2011	Catalina	CSS	·	1.2 km	MPC · JPL
660528	2002 CC_{85}	—	January 8, 2002	Socorro	LINEAR	·	1.8 km	MPC · JPL
660529	2002 CD_{116}	—	February 15, 2002	Ondřejov	P. Kušnirák, P. Pravec	·	2.1 km	MPC · JPL
660530	2002 CB_{127}	—	February 7, 2002	Socorro	LINEAR	EUN	1.3 km	MPC · JPL
660531	2002 CO_{142}	—	February 9, 2002	Socorro	LINEAR	·	1.9 km	MPC · JPL
660532	2002 CT_{189}	—	February 10, 2002	Socorro	LINEAR	EOS	1.6 km	MPC · JPL
660533	2002 CO_{231}	—	February 15, 2002	Cerro Tololo	Deep Lens Survey	L4	7.5 km	MPC · JPL
660534	2002 CP_{231}	—	February 15, 2002	Cerro Tololo	Deep Lens Survey	L4	7.4 km	MPC · JPL
660535	2002 CV_{266}	—	February 7, 2002	Kitt Peak	Spacewatch	·	2.2 km	MPC · JPL
660536	2002 CB_{269}	—	February 7, 2002	Socorro	LINEAR	·	2.1 km	MPC · JPL
660537	2002 CJ_{269}	—	February 10, 2002	Socorro	LINEAR	·	1.5 km	MPC · JPL
660538	2002 CN_{271}	—	February 8, 2002	Kitt Peak	Spacewatch	·	2.7 km	MPC · JPL
660539	2002 CH_{292}	—	February 5, 2002	Palomar	NEAT	·	1.8 km	MPC · JPL
660540	2002 CD_{297}	—	February 10, 2002	Socorro	LINEAR	BRA	1.6 km	MPC · JPL
660541	2002 CY_{314}	—	January 8, 2006	Catalina	CSS	·	1.4 km	MPC · JPL
660542	2002 CX_{317}	—	February 6, 2002	Palomar	NEAT	LIX	2.4 km	MPC · JPL
660543	2002 CD_{320}	—	February 13, 2002	Kitt Peak	Spacewatch	·	1.5 km	MPC · JPL
660544	2002 CZ_{320}	—	January 12, 2010	Mount Lemmon	Mount Lemmon Survey	·	1.4 km	MPC · JPL
660545	2002 CO_{321}	—	April 30, 2014	Haleakala	Pan-STARRS 1	·	2.1 km	MPC · JPL
660546	2002 CP_{323}	—	August 29, 2005	Kitt Peak	Spacewatch	·	2.0 km	MPC · JPL
660547	2002 CR_{323}	—	November 3, 2016	Haleakala	Pan-STARRS 1	·	780 m	MPC · JPL
660548	2002 CT_{324}	—	January 18, 2015	Haleakala	Pan-STARRS 1	·	1.5 km	MPC · JPL
660549	2002 DN_{4}	—	February 16, 2002	Cerro Tololo	Deep Lens Survey	·	2.6 km	MPC · JPL
660550	2002 DX_{4}	—	February 18, 2002	Cerro Tololo	Deep Lens Survey	·	2.5 km	MPC · JPL
660551	2002 DH_{21}	—	July 14, 2013	Haleakala	Pan-STARRS 1	·	670 m	MPC · JPL
660552	2002 DK_{21}	—	October 9, 2008	Mount Lemmon	Mount Lemmon Survey	·	1.6 km	MPC · JPL
660553	2002 DY_{21}	—	October 4, 2003	Kitt Peak	Spacewatch	PHO	820 m	MPC · JPL
660554	2002 DB_{22}	—	October 23, 2005	Catalina	CSS	EOS	1.9 km	MPC · JPL
660555	2002 DF_{22}	—	September 22, 2016	Mount Lemmon	Mount Lemmon Survey	·	2.8 km	MPC · JPL
660556	2002 EZ_{4}	—	March 10, 2002	Cima Ekar	ADAS	·	650 m	MPC · JPL
660557	2002 ER_{18}	—	March 9, 2002	Kitt Peak	Spacewatch	·	740 m	MPC · JPL
660558	2002 EX_{35}	—	March 9, 2002	Kitt Peak	Spacewatch	·	940 m	MPC · JPL
660559	2002 EL_{50}	—	March 12, 2002	Palomar	NEAT	·	830 m	MPC · JPL
660560	2002 EJ_{79}	—	March 10, 2002	Haleakala	NEAT	·	1.3 km	MPC · JPL
660561	2002 EB_{120}	—	March 10, 2002	Kitt Peak	Spacewatch	·	2.8 km	MPC · JPL
660562	2002 EX_{164}	—	August 10, 2007	Kitt Peak	Spacewatch	·	810 m	MPC · JPL
660563	2002 EF_{165}	—	February 4, 2002	Anderson Mesa	LONEOS	·	2.5 km	MPC · JPL
660564	2002 EZ_{165}	—	March 5, 2002	Apache Point	SDSS	·	2.4 km	MPC · JPL
660565	2002 EB_{166}	—	February 15, 2013	Haleakala	Pan-STARRS 1	·	2.3 km	MPC · JPL
660566	2002 EQ_{168}	—	March 7, 2016	Haleakala	Pan-STARRS 1	·	2.0 km	MPC · JPL
660567	2002 ED_{169}	—	April 4, 2008	Mount Lemmon	Mount Lemmon Survey	·	2.2 km	MPC · JPL
660568	2002 EN_{169}	—	October 21, 2016	Mount Lemmon	Mount Lemmon Survey	·	730 m	MPC · JPL
660569	2002 EP_{169}	—	September 23, 2011	Kitt Peak	Spacewatch	·	2.6 km	MPC · JPL
660570	2002 ER_{171}	—	February 16, 2013	Mount Lemmon	Mount Lemmon Survey	VER	2.4 km	MPC · JPL
660571	2002 EN_{172}	—	March 10, 2002	Kitt Peak	Spacewatch	·	1.2 km	MPC · JPL
660572	2002 FG_{3}	—	March 16, 2002	Haleakala	NEAT	·	1.8 km	MPC · JPL
660573	2002 FG_{42}	—	March 15, 2013	Kitt Peak	Spacewatch	·	2.0 km	MPC · JPL
660574	2002 FB_{43}	—	November 22, 2008	Kitt Peak	Spacewatch	·	1.3 km	MPC · JPL
660575	2002 FH_{43}	—	January 27, 2015	Haleakala	Pan-STARRS 1	·	1.1 km	MPC · JPL
660576	2002 GS_{3}	—	April 8, 2002	Socorro	LINEAR	H	290 m	MPC · JPL
660577	2002 GY_{9}	—	April 14, 2002	Socorro	LINEAR	·	440 m	MPC · JPL
660578	2002 GN_{15}	—	March 13, 2002	Palomar	NEAT	·	1.1 km	MPC · JPL
660579	2002 GH_{18}	—	April 15, 2002	Kitt Peak	Spacewatch	MAR	1.0 km	MPC · JPL
660580	2002 GR_{26}	—	April 11, 2002	Palomar	NEAT	·	2.1 km	MPC · JPL
660581	2002 GM_{50}	—	March 23, 2002	Socorro	LINEAR	·	1.0 km	MPC · JPL
660582	2002 GG_{60}	—	April 8, 2002	Kitt Peak	Spacewatch	·	570 m	MPC · JPL
660583	2002 GO_{104}	—	April 10, 2002	Socorro	LINEAR	·	2.2 km	MPC · JPL
660584	2002 GO_{184}	—	April 8, 2002	Palomar	NEAT	·	1.7 km	MPC · JPL
660585	2002 GG_{188}	—	April 13, 2002	Palomar	NEAT	·	2.9 km	MPC · JPL
660586	2002 GH_{190}	—	September 14, 2009	Kitt Peak	Spacewatch	·	3.5 km	MPC · JPL
660587	2002 GY_{191}	—	October 13, 2010	Catalina	CSS	·	3.0 km	MPC · JPL
660588	2002 GM_{193}	—	March 23, 2015	Kitt Peak	Spacewatch	·	1.5 km	MPC · JPL
660589	2002 GQ_{193}	—	March 12, 2013	Kitt Peak	Spacewatch	·	2.3 km	MPC · JPL
660590	2002 GU_{193}	—	May 24, 2006	Mount Lemmon	Mount Lemmon Survey	·	1.1 km	MPC · JPL
660591	2002 GZ_{193}	—	February 28, 2009	Mount Lemmon	Mount Lemmon Survey	MAS	630 m	MPC · JPL
660592	2002 GC_{194}	—	August 1, 2014	Haleakala	Pan-STARRS 1	MAS	610 m	MPC · JPL
660593	2002 GV_{195}	—	October 17, 1995	Kitt Peak	Spacewatch	(5)	1.2 km	MPC · JPL
660594	2002 GQ_{197}	—	November 12, 2005	Kitt Peak	Spacewatch	THM	1.6 km	MPC · JPL
660595	2002 GH_{198}	—	April 13, 2002	Kitt Peak	Spacewatch	MAS	580 m	MPC · JPL
660596	2002 HY_{8}	—	April 21, 2002	Socorro	LINEAR	·	1.4 km	MPC · JPL
660597	2002 JL_{3}	—	April 12, 2002	Kitt Peak	Spacewatch	·	1.3 km	MPC · JPL
660598	2002 JH_{48}	—	April 18, 2002	Palomar	NEAT	·	1.2 km	MPC · JPL
660599	2002 JD_{109}	—	May 15, 2002	Anderson Mesa	LONEOS	APO	720 m	MPC · JPL
660600	2002 JL_{128}	—	May 7, 2002	Palomar	NEAT	(2076)	860 m	MPC · JPL

== 660601–660700 ==
back to top

Designation			Discovery			Properties		Ref
Permanent	Provisional	Named after	Date	Site	Discoverer(s)	Category	Diam.	Ref
660601	2002 JT_{150}	—	October 25, 2005	Catalina	CSS	H	530 m	MPC · JPL
660602	2002 JW_{150}	—	May 1, 2002	Palomar	NEAT	·	1.8 km	MPC · JPL
660603	2002 JT_{151}	—	August 15, 2007	Črni Vrh	Skvarč, J.	·	2.0 km	MPC · JPL
660604	2002 JY_{151}	—	May 30, 2006	Mount Lemmon	Mount Lemmon Survey	NYS	1.2 km	MPC · JPL
660605	2002 JZ_{151}	—	February 9, 2008	Kitt Peak	Spacewatch	·	590 m	MPC · JPL
660606	2002 JA_{152}	—	March 7, 2013	Kitt Peak	Spacewatch	MAS	690 m	MPC · JPL
660607	2002 JG_{152}	—	February 11, 2012	Mount Lemmon	Mount Lemmon Survey	ELF	3.5 km	MPC · JPL
660608	2002 JM_{152}	—	February 22, 2009	Kitt Peak	Spacewatch	NYS	930 m	MPC · JPL
660609	2002 JA_{153}	—	May 22, 2015	Haleakala	Pan-STARRS 1	·	570 m	MPC · JPL
660610	2002 JY_{153}	—	June 12, 2015	Haleakala	Pan-STARRS 1	·	590 m	MPC · JPL
660611	2002 KO_{16}	—	May 23, 2002	Palomar	NEAT	·	660 m	MPC · JPL
660612	2002 KC_{17}	—	October 25, 2011	Haleakala	Pan-STARRS 1	PHO	1.2 km	MPC · JPL
660613	2002 LO_{24}	—	June 3, 2002	Palomar	NEAT	·	1.8 km	MPC · JPL
660614	2002 LC_{26}	—	June 3, 2002	Palomar	NEAT	·	2.1 km	MPC · JPL
660615	2002 LU_{38}	—	May 3, 2002	Kitt Peak	Spacewatch	·	1.7 km	MPC · JPL
660616	2002 LS_{63}	—	May 28, 2009	Mount Lemmon	Mount Lemmon Survey	·	1.0 km	MPC · JPL
660617	2002 LY_{63}	—	June 2, 2002	Palomar	NEAT	·	1.7 km	MPC · JPL
660618	2002 LH_{66}	—	August 12, 2012	Siding Spring	SSS	·	500 m	MPC · JPL
660619	2002 MF_{4}	—	June 21, 2002	La Palma	S. Collander-Brown, A. Fitzsimmons	·	1.4 km	MPC · JPL
660620	2002 MU_{5}	—	June 23, 2002	La Palma	S. Collander-Brown, A. Fitzsimmons	·	980 m	MPC · JPL
660621	2002 MJ_{7}	—	January 16, 2009	Mount Lemmon	Mount Lemmon Survey	·	1.7 km	MPC · JPL
660622	2002 MX_{7}	—	September 22, 2008	Catalina	CSS	·	3.5 km	MPC · JPL
660623	2002 ME_{8}	—	June 18, 2002	Palomar	NEAT	ADE	2.2 km	MPC · JPL
660624	2002 NP_{37}	—	July 9, 2002	Socorro	LINEAR	EUN	1.2 km	MPC · JPL
660625	2002 NQ_{64}	—	July 2, 2002	Palomar	NEAT	·	1.3 km	MPC · JPL
660626	2002 NR_{65}	—	October 17, 2003	Kitt Peak	Spacewatch	·	2.2 km	MPC · JPL
660627	2002 NM_{66}	—	July 9, 2002	Palomar	NEAT	·	2.1 km	MPC · JPL
660628	2002 NN_{75}	—	July 5, 2002	Palomar	NEAT	·	1.1 km	MPC · JPL
660629	2002 NW_{75}	—	August 5, 2002	Palomar	NEAT	·	950 m	MPC · JPL
660630	2002 NX_{76}	—	July 15, 2002	Palomar	NEAT	·	1.4 km	MPC · JPL
660631	2002 NF_{77}	—	August 13, 2002	Palomar	NEAT	HNS	1.2 km	MPC · JPL
660632	2002 NE_{80}	—	July 20, 2002	Palomar	NEAT	·	1.6 km	MPC · JPL
660633	2002 NP_{81}	—	May 20, 2005	Mount Lemmon	Mount Lemmon Survey	·	620 m	MPC · JPL
660634	2002 NQ_{81}	—	October 26, 2011	Haleakala	Pan-STARRS 1	·	1.3 km	MPC · JPL
660635	2002 NT_{81}	—	September 25, 2008	Kitt Peak	Spacewatch	·	2.4 km	MPC · JPL
660636	2002 OR_{5}	—	June 10, 2002	Palomar	NEAT	·	1.6 km	MPC · JPL
660637	2002 OP_{6}	—	July 12, 2002	Palomar	NEAT	·	2.5 km	MPC · JPL
660638	2002 OO_{33}	—	March 28, 2008	Mount Lemmon	Mount Lemmon Survey	·	720 m	MPC · JPL
660639	2002 OO_{35}	—	July 19, 2002	Palomar	NEAT	·	1.4 km	MPC · JPL
660640	2002 OP_{35}	—	July 19, 2002	Palomar	NEAT	KON	1.8 km	MPC · JPL
660641	2002 OF_{36}	—	April 7, 2008	Mount Lemmon	Mount Lemmon Survey	·	470 m	MPC · JPL
660642	2002 OH_{36}	—	July 18, 2002	Palomar	NEAT	·	1.4 km	MPC · JPL
660643	2002 OG_{38}	—	December 13, 1999	Kitt Peak	Spacewatch	·	1.8 km	MPC · JPL
660644	2002 PD_{2}	—	August 3, 2002	Palomar	NEAT	ADE	1.7 km	MPC · JPL
660645	2002 PR_{7}	—	July 12, 2002	Palomar	NEAT	·	960 m	MPC · JPL
660646	2002 PR_{17}	—	August 6, 2002	Palomar	NEAT	·	2.6 km	MPC · JPL
660647	2002 PU_{19}	—	August 6, 2002	Palomar	NEAT	·	1.9 km	MPC · JPL
660648	2002 PM_{20}	—	July 18, 2002	Palomar	NEAT	·	1.3 km	MPC · JPL
660649	2002 PK_{34}	—	August 6, 2002	Palomar	NEAT	EUN	1.3 km	MPC · JPL
660650	2002 PG_{51}	—	August 8, 2002	Palomar	NEAT	HYG	2.7 km	MPC · JPL
660651	2002 PE_{120}	—	July 30, 2002	Haleakala	NEAT	·	940 m	MPC · JPL
660652	2002 PY_{131}	—	August 7, 2002	Palomar	NEAT	·	1.5 km	MPC · JPL
660653	2002 PL_{141}	—	August 14, 2002	Palomar	NEAT	·	2.0 km	MPC · JPL
660654	2002 PT_{141}	—	August 4, 2002	Palomar	NEAT	·	1.7 km	MPC · JPL
660655	2002 PT_{168}	—	August 8, 2002	Palomar	NEAT	·	2.6 km	MPC · JPL
660656	2002 PO_{170}	—	August 12, 2002	Cerro Tololo	Deep Ecliptic Survey	·	440 m	MPC · JPL
660657	2002 PF_{176}	—	August 7, 2002	Palomar	NEAT	·	540 m	MPC · JPL
660658	2002 PP_{185}	—	August 15, 2002	Palomar	NEAT	·	820 m	MPC · JPL
660659	2002 PW_{185}	—	August 15, 2002	Palomar	NEAT	·	1.9 km	MPC · JPL
660660	2002 PC_{189}	—	August 6, 2002	Palomar	NEAT	·	600 m	MPC · JPL
660661	2002 PH_{190}	—	August 15, 2002	Palomar	NEAT	V	590 m	MPC · JPL
660662	2002 PG_{191}	—	September 12, 2007	Mount Lemmon	Mount Lemmon Survey	·	2.3 km	MPC · JPL
660663	2002 PE_{197}	—	October 16, 2006	Kitt Peak	Spacewatch	·	890 m	MPC · JPL
660664	2002 PT_{197}	—	August 29, 2006	Kitt Peak	Spacewatch	NYS	940 m	MPC · JPL
660665	2002 PS_{198}	—	September 3, 2002	Palomar	NEAT	EUN	1.1 km	MPC · JPL
660666	2002 PH_{199}	—	May 7, 2010	Kitt Peak	Spacewatch	·	910 m	MPC · JPL
660667	2002 PZ_{199}	—	March 4, 2005	Mount Lemmon	Mount Lemmon Survey	·	920 m	MPC · JPL
660668	2002 PA_{205}	—	August 14, 2002	Kitt Peak	Spacewatch	·	530 m	MPC · JPL
660669	2002 PL_{205}	—	November 8, 2010	Mount Lemmon	Mount Lemmon Survey	·	900 m	MPC · JPL
660670	2002 PO_{205}	—	September 21, 2009	Mount Lemmon	Mount Lemmon Survey	·	3.9 km	MPC · JPL
660671	2002 QE_{4}	—	August 16, 2002	Haleakala	NEAT	EUN	1.3 km	MPC · JPL
660672	2002 QB_{9}	—	August 18, 2002	Haleakala	NEAT	EUN	1.3 km	MPC · JPL
660673	2002 QR_{21}	—	August 14, 2002	Socorro	LINEAR	·	3.3 km	MPC · JPL
660674	2002 QN_{24}	—	August 12, 2002	Anderson Mesa	LONEOS	·	850 m	MPC · JPL
660675	2002 QT_{25}	—	August 29, 2002	Kitt Peak	Spacewatch	·	1.2 km	MPC · JPL
660676	2002 QB_{52}	—	September 15, 2002	Haleakala	NEAT	·	3.8 km	MPC · JPL
660677	2002 QL_{53}	—	August 29, 2002	Palomar	NEAT	DOR	2.2 km	MPC · JPL
660678	2002 QB_{59}	—	August 27, 2002	Palomar	NEAT	·	1.2 km	MPC · JPL
660679	2002 QZ_{74}	—	August 29, 2002	Palomar	NEAT	·	2.4 km	MPC · JPL
660680	2002 QF_{75}	—	August 18, 2002	Palomar	NEAT	·	1.3 km	MPC · JPL
660681	2002 QY_{77}	—	August 17, 2002	Palomar	NEAT	EOS	1.8 km	MPC · JPL
660682	2002 QJ_{78}	—	August 29, 2002	Palomar	NEAT	·	610 m	MPC · JPL
660683	2002 QL_{83}	—	August 17, 2002	Palomar	NEAT	·	1.6 km	MPC · JPL
660684	2002 QV_{84}	—	August 30, 2002	Palomar	NEAT	·	580 m	MPC · JPL
660685	2002 QL_{86}	—	August 13, 2002	Kitt Peak	Spacewatch	·	2.1 km	MPC · JPL
660686	2002 QW_{93}	—	August 29, 2002	Palomar	NEAT	·	1.7 km	MPC · JPL
660687	2002 QD_{97}	—	August 18, 2002	Palomar	NEAT	·	2.9 km	MPC · JPL
660688	2002 QR_{97}	—	August 12, 2002	Anderson Mesa	LONEOS	·	1.1 km	MPC · JPL
660689	2002 QX_{99}	—	August 29, 2002	Palomar	NEAT	NYS	970 m	MPC · JPL
660690	2002 QC_{120}	—	August 30, 2002	Palomar	NEAT	WIT	980 m	MPC · JPL
660691	2002 QJ_{126}	—	August 17, 2002	Palomar	NEAT	·	2.6 km	MPC · JPL
660692	2002 QP_{126}	—	August 30, 2002	Palomar	NEAT	·	570 m	MPC · JPL
660693	2002 QC_{136}	—	August 18, 2002	Palomar	NEAT	·	1.9 km	MPC · JPL
660694	2002 QM_{138}	—	August 13, 2002	Kitt Peak	Spacewatch	·	2.4 km	MPC · JPL
660695	2002 QY_{140}	—	August 16, 2002	Palomar	NEAT	H	570 m	MPC · JPL
660696	2002 QW_{141}	—	September 7, 2008	Mount Lemmon	Mount Lemmon Survey	·	3.3 km	MPC · JPL
660697	2002 QU_{144}	—	September 26, 2006	Kitt Peak	Spacewatch	NYS	770 m	MPC · JPL
660698	2002 QF_{145}	—	September 23, 2008	Mount Lemmon	Mount Lemmon Survey	·	3.3 km	MPC · JPL
660699	2002 QV_{147}	—	November 13, 2006	Kitt Peak	Spacewatch	·	880 m	MPC · JPL
660700	2002 QC_{150}	—	January 30, 2011	Mount Lemmon	Mount Lemmon Survey	·	900 m	MPC · JPL

== 660701–660800 ==
back to top

Designation			Discovery			Properties		Ref
Permanent	Provisional	Named after	Date	Site	Discoverer(s)	Category	Diam.	Ref
660701	2002 QE_{150}	—	June 22, 2009	Mount Lemmon	Mount Lemmon Survey	·	1.2 km	MPC · JPL
660702	2002 QT_{150}	—	March 4, 2005	Mount Lemmon	Mount Lemmon Survey	·	3.2 km	MPC · JPL
660703	2002 QZ_{150}	—	July 28, 2009	Kitt Peak	Spacewatch	V	600 m	MPC · JPL
660704	2002 QV_{151}	—	October 28, 2008	Mount Lemmon	Mount Lemmon Survey	EOS	1.9 km	MPC · JPL
660705	2002 QC_{152}	—	April 6, 2010	Catalina	CSS	·	1.8 km	MPC · JPL
660706	2002 QU_{152}	—	October 10, 2008	Mount Lemmon	Mount Lemmon Survey	·	2.8 km	MPC · JPL
660707	2002 QR_{156}	—	August 3, 2002	Palomar	NEAT	PHO	1.1 km	MPC · JPL
660708	2002 QX_{156}	—	November 26, 2009	Mount Lemmon	Mount Lemmon Survey	·	3.6 km	MPC · JPL
660709	2002 QL_{157}	—	February 2, 2008	Mount Lemmon	Mount Lemmon Survey	·	1.0 km	MPC · JPL
660710	2002 QN_{158}	—	January 16, 2005	Kitt Peak	Spacewatch	·	2.7 km	MPC · JPL
660711	2002 QV_{159}	—	August 16, 2002	Kitt Peak	Spacewatch	·	1.1 km	MPC · JPL
660712	2002 RU_{111}	—	September 6, 2002	Ondřejov	P. Kušnirák, P. Pravec	·	550 m	MPC · JPL
660713	2002 RF_{130}	—	September 11, 2002	Haleakala	NEAT	TIR	3.1 km	MPC · JPL
660714	2002 RA_{131}	—	September 11, 2002	Palomar	NEAT	·	2.8 km	MPC · JPL
660715	2002 RQ_{148}	—	September 11, 2002	Palomar	NEAT	·	1.5 km	MPC · JPL
660716	2002 RN_{149}	—	September 11, 2002	Haleakala	NEAT	·	2.8 km	MPC · JPL
660717	2002 RV_{162}	—	August 29, 2002	Kitt Peak	Spacewatch	·	1.1 km	MPC · JPL
660718	2002 RR_{166}	—	September 13, 2002	Palomar	NEAT	·	1.3 km	MPC · JPL
660719	2002 RR_{179}	—	September 14, 2002	Kitt Peak	Spacewatch	·	1.1 km	MPC · JPL
660720	2002 RY_{180}	—	September 12, 2002	Palomar	NEAT	·	2.1 km	MPC · JPL
660721	2002 RR_{191}	—	September 12, 2002	Palomar	NEAT	EOS	1.9 km	MPC · JPL
660722	2002 RS_{192}	—	September 5, 2002	Socorro	LINEAR	·	1.8 km	MPC · JPL
660723	2002 RJ_{202}	—	March 4, 2001	Kitt Peak	Spacewatch	T_{j} (2.99) · EUP	3.4 km	MPC · JPL
660724	2002 RO_{210}	—	September 15, 2002	Kitt Peak	Spacewatch	·	1.7 km	MPC · JPL
660725	2002 RK_{218}	—	August 20, 2002	Palomar	NEAT	·	870 m	MPC · JPL
660726	2002 RR_{219}	—	August 29, 2002	Palomar	NEAT	EOS	2.3 km	MPC · JPL
660727	2002 RY_{220}	—	September 15, 2002	Palomar	NEAT	·	630 m	MPC · JPL
660728	2002 RY_{234}	—	September 5, 2002	Socorro	LINEAR	·	3.2 km	MPC · JPL
660729	2002 RQ_{241}	—	September 13, 2002	Palomar	NEAT	·	1.7 km	MPC · JPL
660730	2002 RN_{244}	—	August 19, 2002	Palomar	NEAT	·	960 m	MPC · JPL
660731	2002 RS_{247}	—	September 15, 2002	Palomar	NEAT	·	860 m	MPC · JPL
660732	2002 RY_{247}	—	October 3, 2002	Socorro	LINEAR	·	740 m	MPC · JPL
660733	2002 RU_{248}	—	August 31, 2002	Kitt Peak	Spacewatch	·	1.5 km	MPC · JPL
660734	2002 RO_{261}	—	February 22, 2004	Kitt Peak	Spacewatch	·	710 m	MPC · JPL
660735	2002 RP_{263}	—	September 13, 2002	Palomar	NEAT	·	1.4 km	MPC · JPL
660736	2002 RB_{267}	—	January 29, 2007	Kitt Peak	Spacewatch	·	610 m	MPC · JPL
660737	2002 RL_{270}	—	February 14, 2005	Kitt Peak	Spacewatch	EOS	2.0 km	MPC · JPL
660738	2002 RZ_{272}	—	August 10, 2002	Cerro Tololo	Deep Ecliptic Survey	·	1.6 km	MPC · JPL
660739	2002 RZ_{278}	—	September 4, 2002	Anderson Mesa	LONEOS	·	630 m	MPC · JPL
660740	2002 RO_{280}	—	September 17, 2006	Kitt Peak	Spacewatch	·	940 m	MPC · JPL
660741	2002 RS_{280}	—	August 30, 2002	Kitt Peak	Spacewatch	BRA	1.4 km	MPC · JPL
660742	2002 RG_{284}	—	October 8, 2002	Kitt Peak	Spacewatch	·	2.7 km	MPC · JPL
660743	2002 RH_{285}	—	October 25, 2008	Mount Lemmon	Mount Lemmon Survey	·	2.7 km	MPC · JPL
660744	2002 RY_{285}	—	September 1, 2002	Palomar	NEAT	·	3.1 km	MPC · JPL
660745	2002 RG_{288}	—	January 18, 2004	Catalina	CSS	·	1.7 km	MPC · JPL
660746	2002 RZ_{288}	—	September 13, 2002	Palomar	NEAT	·	2.8 km	MPC · JPL
660747	2002 RJ_{289}	—	March 3, 2005	Kitt Peak	Spacewatch	·	3.5 km	MPC · JPL
660748	2002 RC_{290}	—	October 9, 2008	Mount Lemmon	Mount Lemmon Survey	·	3.2 km	MPC · JPL
660749	2002 RG_{293}	—	June 21, 2007	Kitt Peak	Spacewatch	EOS	1.9 km	MPC · JPL
660750	2002 RL_{294}	—	September 13, 2002	Palomar	NEAT	EOS	1.8 km	MPC · JPL
660751	2002 RT_{294}	—	October 3, 2006	Mount Lemmon	Mount Lemmon Survey	·	1.3 km	MPC · JPL
660752	2002 RP_{296}	—	January 11, 2008	Kitt Peak	Spacewatch	·	1.6 km	MPC · JPL
660753	2002 RS_{296}	—	September 28, 2011	Mount Lemmon	Mount Lemmon Survey	·	1.8 km	MPC · JPL
660754	2002 RS_{297}	—	March 11, 2014	Kitt Peak	Spacewatch	·	680 m	MPC · JPL
660755	2002 RP_{298}	—	February 20, 2014	Mount Lemmon	Mount Lemmon Survey	·	1.7 km	MPC · JPL
660756	2002 RQ_{298}	—	September 13, 2007	Mount Lemmon	Mount Lemmon Survey	·	1.4 km	MPC · JPL
660757	2002 SH_{14}	—	September 27, 2002	Palomar	NEAT	·	510 m	MPC · JPL
660758	2002 SV_{17}	—	September 26, 2002	Palomar	NEAT	·	3.4 km	MPC · JPL
660759	2002 SR_{59}	—	September 3, 2002	Palomar	NEAT	·	570 m	MPC · JPL
660760	2002 SP_{60}	—	September 16, 2002	Palomar	NEAT	ADE	2.0 km	MPC · JPL
660761	2002 SV_{66}	—	September 16, 2002	Palomar	NEAT	·	1.0 km	MPC · JPL
660762	2002 SO_{69}	—	September 26, 2002	Palomar	NEAT	·	1.7 km	MPC · JPL
660763	2002 SU_{69}	—	September 26, 2002	Palomar	NEAT	·	610 m	MPC · JPL
660764	2002 SG_{72}	—	September 16, 2002	Palomar	NEAT	EOS	2.0 km	MPC · JPL
660765	2002 SJ_{74}	—	November 19, 2007	Kitt Peak	Spacewatch	·	1.8 km	MPC · JPL
660766	2002 SN_{75}	—	February 11, 2011	Mount Lemmon	Mount Lemmon Survey	·	3.2 km	MPC · JPL
660767	2002 ST_{75}	—	September 19, 2006	Kitt Peak	Spacewatch	·	1.1 km	MPC · JPL
660768	2002 TA_{13}	—	October 1, 2002	Anderson Mesa	LONEOS	·	1.2 km	MPC · JPL
660769	2002 TM_{18}	—	September 26, 2002	Palomar	NEAT	·	690 m	MPC · JPL
660770	2002 TL_{35}	—	October 2, 2002	Socorro	LINEAR	·	970 m	MPC · JPL
660771	2002 TL_{55}	—	September 7, 2002	Socorro	LINEAR	·	640 m	MPC · JPL
660772	2002 TV_{61}	—	October 3, 2002	Palomar	NEAT	H	470 m	MPC · JPL
660773	2002 TW_{71}	—	October 3, 2002	Palomar	NEAT	·	700 m	MPC · JPL
660774	2002 TF_{87}	—	October 3, 2002	Socorro	LINEAR	NYS	920 m	MPC · JPL
660775	2002 TG_{87}	—	October 3, 2002	Socorro	LINEAR	·	1.3 km	MPC · JPL
660776	2002 TN_{92}	—	September 27, 2002	Palomar	NEAT	·	3.6 km	MPC · JPL
660777	2002 TZ_{95}	—	October 3, 2002	Palomar	NEAT	·	3.0 km	MPC · JPL
660778	2002 TD_{100}	—	October 4, 2002	Palomar	NEAT	·	1.7 km	MPC · JPL
660779	2002 TE_{112}	—	September 13, 2002	Socorro	LINEAR	H	610 m	MPC · JPL
660780	2002 TX_{114}	—	October 3, 2002	Palomar	NEAT	·	2.2 km	MPC · JPL
660781	2002 TZ_{123}	—	September 3, 2002	Palomar	NEAT	·	3.2 km	MPC · JPL
660782	2002 TP_{125}	—	September 12, 2002	Palomar	NEAT	·	3.4 km	MPC · JPL
660783	2002 TE_{130}	—	September 16, 2002	Palomar	NEAT	·	2.3 km	MPC · JPL
660784	2002 TY_{133}	—	October 4, 2002	Palomar	NEAT	·	2.7 km	MPC · JPL
660785	2002 TX_{141}	—	October 5, 2002	Palomar	NEAT	·	790 m	MPC · JPL
660786	2002 TC_{142}	—	October 5, 2002	Palomar	NEAT	PHO	1.1 km	MPC · JPL
660787	2002 TF_{142}	—	September 29, 2002	Haleakala	NEAT	·	3.3 km	MPC · JPL
660788	2002 TJ_{153}	—	October 5, 2002	Palomar	NEAT	·	3.7 km	MPC · JPL
660789	2002 TP_{163}	—	October 5, 2002	Palomar	NEAT	·	2.8 km	MPC · JPL
660790	2002 TV_{193}	—	October 3, 2002	Socorro	LINEAR	·	980 m	MPC · JPL
660791	2002 TX_{193}	—	October 3, 2002	Socorro	LINEAR	·	4.0 km	MPC · JPL
660792	2002 TC_{222}	—	October 7, 2002	Socorro	LINEAR	·	650 m	MPC · JPL
660793	2002 TW_{234}	—	October 6, 2002	Socorro	LINEAR	·	1.2 km	MPC · JPL
660794	2002 TM_{241}	—	February 8, 2011	Mount Lemmon	Mount Lemmon Survey	MAS	680 m	MPC · JPL
660795	2002 TA_{263}	—	October 10, 2002	Palomar	NEAT	EOS	2.2 km	MPC · JPL
660796	2002 TR_{390}	—	February 3, 2016	Haleakala	Pan-STARRS 1	·	3.7 km	MPC · JPL
660797	2002 TT_{390}	—	September 24, 2012	Mount Lemmon	Mount Lemmon Survey	·	630 m	MPC · JPL
660798 Karltreusch	2002 TG_{391}	Karltreusch	February 21, 2012	Mount Graham	K. Černis, R. P. Boyle	(69559)	2.4 km	MPC · JPL
660799	2002 TZ_{392}	—	December 13, 2015	Haleakala	Pan-STARRS 1	·	500 m	MPC · JPL
660800	2002 UR_{11}	—	October 30, 2002	Palomar	NEAT	HNS	1.3 km	MPC · JPL

== 660801–660900 ==
back to top

Designation			Discovery			Properties		Ref
Permanent	Provisional	Named after	Date	Site	Discoverer(s)	Category	Diam.	Ref
660801	2002 UN_{47}	—	October 31, 2002	Socorro	LINEAR	LIX	3.6 km	MPC · JPL
660802	2002 UV_{47}	—	October 31, 2002	Haleakala	NEAT	·	1.0 km	MPC · JPL
660803	2002 US_{71}	—	April 10, 2005	Kitt Peak	Deep Ecliptic Survey	·	1.8 km	MPC · JPL
660804	2002 UR_{75}	—	October 31, 2002	Palomar	NEAT	·	560 m	MPC · JPL
660805	2002 UT_{75}	—	November 5, 2002	Kitt Peak	Spacewatch	·	1.6 km	MPC · JPL
660806	2002 UV_{77}	—	October 29, 2002	Palomar	NEAT	H	390 m	MPC · JPL
660807	2002 UH_{80}	—	January 10, 2013	Haleakala	Pan-STARRS 1	·	490 m	MPC · JPL
660808	2002 UL_{80}	—	November 14, 2002	Kitt Peak	Spacewatch	·	2.2 km	MPC · JPL
660809	2002 UH_{81}	—	August 26, 2005	Palomar	NEAT	·	570 m	MPC · JPL
660810	2002 UT_{81}	—	October 31, 2002	Haleakala	NEAT	T_{j} (2.99)	3.4 km	MPC · JPL
660811	2002 VJ_{9}	—	November 1, 2002	Palomar	NEAT	·	620 m	MPC · JPL
660812	2002 VG_{10}	—	November 1, 2002	Palomar	NEAT	·	2.0 km	MPC · JPL
660813	2002 VU_{21}	—	October 15, 2002	Palomar	NEAT	·	2.5 km	MPC · JPL
660814	2002 VV_{24}	—	November 5, 2002	Kitt Peak	Spacewatch	·	1.3 km	MPC · JPL
660815	2002 VW_{44}	—	October 6, 2002	Haleakala	NEAT	·	1.4 km	MPC · JPL
660816	2002 VP_{45}	—	October 18, 2002	Palomar	NEAT	GEF	1.3 km	MPC · JPL
660817	2002 VY_{51}	—	November 6, 2002	Anderson Mesa	LONEOS	·	1.3 km	MPC · JPL
660818	2002 VD_{58}	—	November 6, 2002	Haleakala	NEAT	·	2.9 km	MPC · JPL
660819	2002 VH_{97}	—	October 12, 2002	Socorro	LINEAR	·	1.1 km	MPC · JPL
660820	2002 VY_{101}	—	October 31, 2002	Haleakala	NEAT	·	2.8 km	MPC · JPL
660821	2002 VJ_{118}	—	November 14, 2002	Socorro	LINEAR	H	650 m	MPC · JPL
660822	2002 VD_{137}	—	November 13, 2002	Kitt Peak	Spacewatch	EOS	1.9 km	MPC · JPL
660823	2002 VC_{143}	—	December 20, 2007	Mount Lemmon	Mount Lemmon Survey	·	2.0 km	MPC · JPL
660824	2002 VC_{145}	—	December 13, 2006	Kitt Peak	Spacewatch	·	970 m	MPC · JPL
660825	2002 VT_{146}	—	November 4, 2002	Palomar	NEAT	·	2.0 km	MPC · JPL
660826	2002 VB_{148}	—	November 27, 2006	Mount Lemmon	Mount Lemmon Survey	NYS	1.1 km	MPC · JPL
660827	2002 VC_{148}	—	November 15, 2002	Palomar	NEAT	PHO	1.0 km	MPC · JPL
660828	2002 VH_{148}	—	August 27, 2009	Kitt Peak	Spacewatch	·	1 km	MPC · JPL
660829	2002 VA_{150}	—	November 7, 2002	Kitt Peak	Deep Ecliptic Survey	·	980 m	MPC · JPL
660830	2002 VO_{150}	—	October 8, 2012	Kitt Peak	Spacewatch	·	670 m	MPC · JPL
660831	2002 VL_{152}	—	November 17, 2009	Kitt Peak	Spacewatch	·	640 m	MPC · JPL
660832	2002 VB_{153}	—	March 5, 2016	Haleakala	Pan-STARRS 1	PHO	1.1 km	MPC · JPL
660833	2002 WU_{3}	—	November 24, 2002	Palomar	NEAT	·	540 m	MPC · JPL
660834	2002 WH_{10}	—	November 24, 2002	Palomar	NEAT	·	960 m	MPC · JPL
660835	2002 WN_{24}	—	November 16, 2002	Palomar	NEAT	KOR	1.5 km	MPC · JPL
660836	2002 WM_{31}	—	November 28, 2002	Haleakala	NEAT	·	1.2 km	MPC · JPL
660837	2002 WS_{31}	—	December 24, 2011	Catalina	CSS	·	2.0 km	MPC · JPL
660838	2002 WV_{31}	—	November 25, 2002	Palomar	NEAT	·	1.9 km	MPC · JPL
660839	2002 WN_{32}	—	January 27, 2007	Mount Lemmon	Mount Lemmon Survey	·	800 m	MPC · JPL
660840	2002 WO_{32}	—	December 21, 2012	Mount Lemmon	Mount Lemmon Survey	KOR	1.4 km	MPC · JPL
660841	2002 WP_{32}	—	July 27, 2009	Catalina	CSS	NYS	1.1 km	MPC · JPL
660842	2002 XS_{34}	—	December 6, 2002	Socorro	LINEAR	·	700 m	MPC · JPL
660843	2002 XP_{45}	—	December 5, 2002	Socorro	LINEAR	H	550 m	MPC · JPL
660844	2002 XK_{47}	—	December 9, 2002	Kitt Peak	Spacewatch	TIR	3.0 km	MPC · JPL
660845	2002 XL_{91}	—	December 5, 2002	Socorro	LINEAR	·	1.3 km	MPC · JPL
660846	2002 XT_{120}	—	December 3, 2002	Palomar	NEAT	·	940 m	MPC · JPL
660847	2002 XY_{120}	—	September 28, 2009	Kitt Peak	Spacewatch	·	1.1 km	MPC · JPL
660848	2002 XJ_{121}	—	June 16, 2012	Kitt Peak	Spacewatch	·	870 m	MPC · JPL
660849	2002 XK_{121}	—	December 3, 2002	Palomar	NEAT	(2076)	700 m	MPC · JPL
660850	2002 XW_{121}	—	December 23, 2013	Mount Lemmon	Mount Lemmon Survey	V	610 m	MPC · JPL
660851	2002 XB_{122}	—	January 19, 2009	Mount Lemmon	Mount Lemmon Survey	·	1.6 km	MPC · JPL
660852	2002 XQ_{124}	—	February 18, 2015	Kitt Peak	Research and Education Collaborative Occultation Network	·	2.1 km	MPC · JPL
660853	2002 YT_{12}	—	December 9, 2002	Kitt Peak	Spacewatch	·	1.8 km	MPC · JPL
660854	2002 YR_{13}	—	December 31, 2002	Socorro	LINEAR	MAS	730 m	MPC · JPL
660855	2002 YR_{24}	—	December 31, 2002	Socorro	LINEAR	·	2.4 km	MPC · JPL
660856	2002 YY_{36}	—	December 28, 2002	Kitt Peak	Spacewatch	EOS	1.7 km	MPC · JPL
660857	2003 AH_{95}	—	July 14, 2013	Haleakala	Pan-STARRS 1	·	1.1 km	MPC · JPL
660858	2003 BP_{50}	—	January 27, 2003	Socorro	LINEAR	·	1.5 km	MPC · JPL
660859	2003 BH_{69}	—	January 31, 2003	Socorro	LINEAR	·	720 m	MPC · JPL
660860	2003 BB_{85}	—	January 31, 2003	Socorro	LINEAR	(13314)	2.0 km	MPC · JPL
660861	2003 BL_{86}	—	January 25, 2003	La Silla	A. Boattini, Hainaut, O.	KON	1.7 km	MPC · JPL
660862	2003 BH_{95}	—	November 20, 2007	Mount Lemmon	Mount Lemmon Survey	VER	3.0 km	MPC · JPL
660863	2003 BM_{95}	—	August 30, 2017	Mount Lemmon	Mount Lemmon Survey	·	3.0 km	MPC · JPL
660864	2003 BM_{97}	—	July 7, 2016	Haleakala	Pan-STARRS 1	·	1.7 km	MPC · JPL
660865	2003 BF_{99}	—	July 13, 2013	Haleakala	Pan-STARRS 1	BRG	1.5 km	MPC · JPL
660866	2003 BA_{101}	—	September 27, 2011	Mount Lemmon	Mount Lemmon Survey	EOS	1.6 km	MPC · JPL
660867	2003 CW_{14}	—	February 4, 2003	Anderson Mesa	LONEOS	·	2.3 km	MPC · JPL
660868	2003 CH_{23}	—	February 4, 2003	La Silla	Barbieri, C.	·	890 m	MPC · JPL
660869	2003 CO_{23}	—	February 4, 2003	La Silla	Barbieri, C.	·	1.1 km	MPC · JPL
660870	2003 CS_{23}	—	February 4, 2003	La Silla	Barbieri, C.	·	1.6 km	MPC · JPL
660871	2003 DD_{2}	—	February 21, 2003	Palomar	NEAT	GEF	1.4 km	MPC · JPL
660872	2003 DS_{8}	—	February 22, 2003	Palomar	NEAT	DOR	2.2 km	MPC · JPL
660873	2003 DQ_{10}	—	February 26, 2003	Campo Imperatore	CINEOS	·	2.2 km	MPC · JPL
660874	2003 EG_{5}	—	March 3, 2003	Haleakala	NEAT	·	1.4 km	MPC · JPL
660875	2003 ED_{17}	—	March 9, 2003	Socorro	LINEAR	·	1.4 km	MPC · JPL
660876	2003 EA_{50}	—	February 6, 2003	Palomar	NEAT	·	1.2 km	MPC · JPL
660877	2003 FB_{32}	—	March 23, 2003	Kitt Peak	Spacewatch	·	1.1 km	MPC · JPL
660878	2003 FN_{96}	—	March 30, 2003	Kitt Peak	Spacewatch	KOR	1.2 km	MPC · JPL
660879	2003 FK_{97}	—	March 11, 2003	Kitt Peak	Spacewatch	NYS	1.2 km	MPC · JPL
660880	2003 FV_{97}	—	March 23, 2003	Palomar	NEAT	(18466)	2.7 km	MPC · JPL
660881	2003 FX_{125}	—	March 30, 2003	Kitt Peak	Deep Ecliptic Survey	·	2.9 km	MPC · JPL
660882	2003 FE_{134}	—	March 24, 2003	Kitt Peak	Spacewatch	·	1.3 km	MPC · JPL
660883	2003 FQ_{134}	—	March 27, 2003	Kitt Peak	Spacewatch	·	780 m	MPC · JPL
660884	2003 FB_{136}	—	May 11, 2007	Mount Lemmon	Mount Lemmon Survey	·	770 m	MPC · JPL
660885	2003 FX_{136}	—	February 17, 2010	Kitt Peak	Spacewatch	·	580 m	MPC · JPL
660886	2003 FH_{137}	—	October 30, 2008	Mount Lemmon	Mount Lemmon Survey	·	720 m	MPC · JPL
660887	2003 FK_{138}	—	April 22, 2014	Cerro Tololo-DECam	DECam	·	1.6 km	MPC · JPL
660888	2003 FW_{138}	—	March 25, 2003	Palomar	NEAT	·	1.2 km	MPC · JPL
660889	2003 FF_{140}	—	May 3, 2014	Haleakala	Pan-STARRS 1	·	680 m	MPC · JPL
660890	2003 FG_{141}	—	March 27, 2003	Palomar	NEAT	·	1.0 km	MPC · JPL
660891	2003 GW_{24}	—	April 7, 2003	Kitt Peak	Spacewatch	·	1.9 km	MPC · JPL
660892	2003 GD_{31}	—	April 8, 2003	Kitt Peak	Spacewatch	·	1.5 km	MPC · JPL
660893	2003 GQ_{35}	—	April 5, 2003	Anderson Mesa	LONEOS	·	1.1 km	MPC · JPL
660894	2003 GX_{57}	—	April 1, 2003	Apache Point	SDSS Collaboration	T_{j} (2.98) · 3:2	5.3 km	MPC · JPL
660895	2003 GZ_{57}	—	April 1, 2003	Apache Point	SDSS	·	1.1 km	MPC · JPL
660896	2003 GC_{58}	—	April 7, 2003	Kitt Peak	Spacewatch	H	420 m	MPC · JPL
660897	2003 GO_{59}	—	March 11, 2015	Mount Lemmon	Mount Lemmon Survey	·	1.2 km	MPC · JPL
660898	2003 GV_{59}	—	February 28, 2014	Haleakala	Pan-STARRS 1	·	2.4 km	MPC · JPL
660899	2003 GJ_{62}	—	September 8, 2011	Kitt Peak	Spacewatch	·	780 m	MPC · JPL
660900	2003 GE_{63}	—	April 12, 2016	Haleakala	Pan-STARRS 1	EUN	1.0 km	MPC · JPL

== 660901–661000 ==
back to top

Designation			Discovery			Properties		Ref
Permanent	Provisional	Named after	Date	Site	Discoverer(s)	Category	Diam.	Ref
660901	2003 GP_{63}	—	November 6, 2012	Mount Lemmon	Mount Lemmon Survey	NYS	640 m	MPC · JPL
660902	2003 GQ_{66}	—	April 8, 2003	Kitt Peak	Spacewatch	·	600 m	MPC · JPL
660903	2003 HV_{16}	—	April 24, 2003	Anderson Mesa	LONEOS	·	1.3 km	MPC · JPL
660904	2003 HW_{23}	—	April 26, 2003	Kitt Peak	Spacewatch	·	1.1 km	MPC · JPL
660905	2003 HO_{24}	—	April 25, 2003	Kitt Peak	Spacewatch	·	1.1 km	MPC · JPL
660906	2003 HY_{25}	—	April 25, 2003	Kitt Peak	Spacewatch	·	1.8 km	MPC · JPL
660907	2003 HW_{27}	—	April 26, 2003	Kitt Peak	Spacewatch	·	840 m	MPC · JPL
660908	2003 HC_{55}	—	April 25, 2003	Kitt Peak	Spacewatch	·	2.3 km	MPC · JPL
660909	2003 HQ_{59}	—	February 13, 2007	Mount Lemmon	Mount Lemmon Survey	TIR	3.0 km	MPC · JPL
660910	2003 HA_{60}	—	April 30, 2003	Kitt Peak	Spacewatch	H	410 m	MPC · JPL
660911	2003 HK_{62}	—	April 15, 2012	Haleakala	Pan-STARRS 1	·	1.2 km	MPC · JPL
660912	2003 JA_{1}	—	May 1, 2003	Kitt Peak	Spacewatch	·	1.9 km	MPC · JPL
660913	2003 JF_{19}	—	April 10, 2014	Haleakala	Pan-STARRS 1	T_{j} (2.95)	3.9 km	MPC · JPL
660914	2003 JS_{20}	—	January 10, 2013	Haleakala	Pan-STARRS 1	·	2.9 km	MPC · JPL
660915	2003 KG_{3}	—	May 23, 2003	Kitt Peak	Spacewatch	·	2.6 km	MPC · JPL
660916	2003 KO_{10}	—	May 26, 2003	Kitt Peak	Spacewatch	·	2.1 km	MPC · JPL
660917	2003 KS_{14}	—	May 25, 2003	Kitt Peak	Spacewatch	·	2.4 km	MPC · JPL
660918	2003 KZ_{22}	—	May 30, 2003	Cerro Tololo	Deep Ecliptic Survey	·	520 m	MPC · JPL
660919	2003 KX_{25}	—	May 31, 2003	Cerro Tololo	Deep Ecliptic Survey	·	2.5 km	MPC · JPL
660920	2003 KO_{27}	—	May 30, 2003	Cerro Tololo	Deep Ecliptic Survey	·	830 m	MPC · JPL
660921	2003 KZ_{37}	—	November 1, 2005	Mount Lemmon	Mount Lemmon Survey	BRA	1.5 km	MPC · JPL
660922	2003 KW_{38}	—	April 29, 2014	Haleakala	Pan-STARRS 1	·	2.6 km	MPC · JPL
660923	2003 LC_{6}	—	June 7, 2003	Kitt Peak	Spacewatch	PHO	880 m	MPC · JPL
660924	2003 LV_{10}	—	March 31, 2016	Haleakala	Pan-STARRS 1	·	1.5 km	MPC · JPL
660925	2003 MB_{2}	—	June 24, 2003	Nogales	P. R. Holvorcem, M. Schwartz	·	1.2 km	MPC · JPL
660926	2003 NZ_{13}	—	March 19, 2010	Kitt Peak	Spacewatch	·	900 m	MPC · JPL
660927	2003 NA_{14}	—	July 8, 2003	Kitt Peak	Spacewatch	·	1.0 km	MPC · JPL
660928	2003 NF_{15}	—	July 8, 2003	Palomar	NEAT	·	1.2 km	MPC · JPL
660929	2003 OW_{12}	—	July 25, 2003	Socorro	LINEAR	·	1.7 km	MPC · JPL
660930	2003 OG_{30}	—	July 25, 2003	Palomar	NEAT	·	1.4 km	MPC · JPL
660931 Antonpetrov	2003 OA_{34}	Antonpetrov	July 31, 2003	Mauna Kea	D. D. Balam, K. M. Perrett	·	2.2 km	MPC · JPL
660932	2003 OT_{34}	—	July 25, 2003	Palomar	NEAT	·	1.7 km	MPC · JPL
660933	2003 OW_{34}	—	July 5, 2003	Kitt Peak	Spacewatch	·	1.2 km	MPC · JPL
660934	2003 OX_{34}	—	August 10, 2016	Haleakala	Pan-STARRS 1	EUN	1.1 km	MPC · JPL
660935	2003 OY_{34}	—	September 12, 2007	Mount Lemmon	Mount Lemmon Survey	·	780 m	MPC · JPL
660936	2003 OK_{35}	—	July 3, 2003	Kitt Peak	Spacewatch	·	1.6 km	MPC · JPL
660937	2003 ON_{35}	—	November 14, 2017	Mount Lemmon	Mount Lemmon Survey	H	480 m	MPC · JPL
660938	2003 OR_{35}	—	February 23, 2018	Mount Lemmon	Mount Lemmon Survey	·	1.5 km	MPC · JPL
660939	2003 PF_{13}	—	December 7, 2008	Mount Lemmon	Mount Lemmon Survey	·	1.3 km	MPC · JPL
660940	2003 QL_{3}	—	August 19, 2003	Campo Imperatore	CINEOS	·	1.2 km	MPC · JPL
660941	2003 QA_{4}	—	August 21, 2003	Palomar	NEAT	·	890 m	MPC · JPL
660942	2003 QV_{15}	—	August 20, 2003	Palomar	NEAT	·	1.4 km	MPC · JPL
660943	2003 QL_{36}	—	August 22, 2003	Palomar	NEAT	·	760 m	MPC · JPL
660944	2003 QW_{66}	—	August 23, 2003	Socorro	LINEAR	·	1.3 km	MPC · JPL
660945	2003 QS_{72}	—	August 23, 2003	Palomar	NEAT	·	1.3 km	MPC · JPL
660946	2003 QS_{94}	—	August 22, 2003	Palomar	NEAT	·	2.2 km	MPC · JPL
660947	2003 QT_{98}	—	August 24, 2003	Cerro Tololo	Deep Ecliptic Survey	·	1.3 km	MPC · JPL
660948	2003 QL_{104}	—	August 2, 2003	Haleakala	NEAT	·	1.6 km	MPC · JPL
660949	2003 QX_{120}	—	December 11, 2013	Haleakala	Pan-STARRS 1	GEF	1.2 km	MPC · JPL
660950	2003 QY_{120}	—	November 7, 2008	Mount Lemmon	Mount Lemmon Survey	·	1.6 km	MPC · JPL
660951	2003 QK_{122}	—	August 28, 2003	Haleakala	NEAT	·	690 m	MPC · JPL
660952	2003 QR_{122}	—	October 1, 2014	Haleakala	Pan-STARRS 1	·	2.0 km	MPC · JPL
660953	2003 QD_{124}	—	January 9, 2006	Kitt Peak	Spacewatch	VER	2.3 km	MPC · JPL
660954	2003 QY_{125}	—	August 25, 2003	Palomar	NEAT	EUN	1.2 km	MPC · JPL
660955	2003 RY_{2}	—	August 23, 2003	Palomar	NEAT	·	880 m	MPC · JPL
660956	2003 RW_{16}	—	September 15, 2003	Palomar	NEAT	EUN	1.2 km	MPC · JPL
660957	2003 RZ_{16}	—	September 2, 2003	Socorro	LINEAR	JUN	1.0 km	MPC · JPL
660958	2003 RF_{17}	—	September 15, 2003	Palomar	NEAT	·	1.4 km	MPC · JPL
660959	2003 RA_{28}	—	September 2, 2014	Haleakala	Pan-STARRS 1	·	1.1 km	MPC · JPL
660960	2003 SQ_{12}	—	August 21, 2003	Campo Imperatore	CINEOS	·	1.4 km	MPC · JPL
660961	2003 SM_{13}	—	August 22, 2003	Palomar	NEAT	·	1.4 km	MPC · JPL
660962	2003 SA_{21}	—	September 16, 2003	Kitt Peak	Spacewatch	·	1.4 km	MPC · JPL
660963	2003 SJ_{23}	—	September 16, 2003	Haleakala	NEAT	·	960 m	MPC · JPL
660964	2003 SV_{23}	—	September 17, 2003	Kitt Peak	Spacewatch	MAS	790 m	MPC · JPL
660965	2003 SP_{31}	—	September 18, 2003	Kitt Peak	Spacewatch	EOS	1.8 km	MPC · JPL
660966	2003 SK_{48}	—	September 18, 2003	Palomar	NEAT	·	1.5 km	MPC · JPL
660967	2003 SH_{52}	—	September 18, 2003	Palomar	NEAT	·	2.5 km	MPC · JPL
660968	2003 SW_{73}	—	September 18, 2003	Kitt Peak	Spacewatch	·	650 m	MPC · JPL
660969	2003 SL_{81}	—	August 25, 2003	Palomar	NEAT	·	1.8 km	MPC · JPL
660970	2003 SG_{86}	—	September 16, 2003	Palomar	NEAT	·	3.1 km	MPC · JPL
660971	2003 SP_{91}	—	September 18, 2003	Palomar	NEAT	·	1.9 km	MPC · JPL
660972	2003 SO_{101}	—	September 21, 2003	Socorro	LINEAR	·	1.6 km	MPC · JPL
660973	2003 SF_{109}	—	September 20, 2003	Kitt Peak	Spacewatch	·	2.7 km	MPC · JPL
660974	2003 SJ_{115}	—	August 25, 2003	Palomar	NEAT	PHO	960 m	MPC · JPL
660975	2003 SA_{125}	—	September 19, 2003	Kitt Peak	Spacewatch	·	1.9 km	MPC · JPL
660976	2003 SV_{127}	—	September 20, 2003	Socorro	LINEAR	·	1.0 km	MPC · JPL
660977	2003 SC_{145}	—	September 19, 2003	Haleakala	NEAT	·	2.4 km	MPC · JPL
660978	2003 SL_{168}	—	August 23, 2003	Palomar	NEAT	·	690 m	MPC · JPL
660979	2003 SY_{171}	—	September 16, 2003	Palomar	NEAT	·	690 m	MPC · JPL
660980	2003 SL_{177}	—	September 18, 2003	Palomar	NEAT	ADE	1.8 km	MPC · JPL
660981	2003 SW_{227}	—	September 16, 2003	Kitt Peak	Spacewatch	·	810 m	MPC · JPL
660982	2003 SN_{228}	—	September 18, 2003	Kitt Peak	Spacewatch	·	1.3 km	MPC · JPL
660983	2003 SH_{240}	—	September 27, 2003	Kitt Peak	Spacewatch	·	1.8 km	MPC · JPL
660984	2003 SS_{241}	—	September 27, 2003	Kitt Peak	Spacewatch	·	1.5 km	MPC · JPL
660985	2003 SG_{243}	—	September 28, 2003	Kitt Peak	Spacewatch	GEF	930 m	MPC · JPL
660986	2003 SF_{262}	—	September 27, 2003	Kitt Peak	Spacewatch	·	3.4 km	MPC · JPL
660987	2003 SZ_{262}	—	September 18, 2003	Palomar	NEAT	·	2.7 km	MPC · JPL
660988	2003 SF_{269}	—	September 27, 2003	Socorro	LINEAR	·	2.9 km	MPC · JPL
660989	2003 SE_{274}	—	September 18, 2003	Palomar	NEAT	EOS	2.2 km	MPC · JPL
660990	2003 SW_{310}	—	September 18, 2003	Palomar	NEAT	T_{j} (2.98) · 3:2	5.5 km	MPC · JPL
660991	2003 SH_{315}	—	September 25, 2003	Palomar	NEAT	·	1.7 km	MPC · JPL
660992	2003 SR_{325}	—	September 21, 2003	Kitt Peak	Spacewatch	·	550 m	MPC · JPL
660993	2003 SQ_{345}	—	September 18, 2003	Palomar	NEAT	EUN	1.1 km	MPC · JPL
660994	2003 SJ_{354}	—	September 22, 2003	Palomar	NEAT	MRX	970 m	MPC · JPL
660995	2003 SA_{358}	—	September 20, 2003	Kitt Peak	Spacewatch	·	970 m	MPC · JPL
660996	2003 SD_{358}	—	September 20, 2003	Kitt Peak	Spacewatch	·	3.4 km	MPC · JPL
660997	2003 SN_{371}	—	September 26, 2003	Apache Point	SDSS Collaboration	·	970 m	MPC · JPL
660998	2003 SY_{375}	—	September 18, 2003	Kitt Peak	Spacewatch	·	410 m	MPC · JPL
660999	2003 SU_{386}	—	October 2, 2003	Kitt Peak	Spacewatch	·	1.0 km	MPC · JPL
661000	2003 SG_{390}	—	September 26, 2003	Apache Point	SDSS Collaboration	·	670 m	MPC · JPL

back to top

== Meaning of names ==
As minor planet discoveries are confirmed, they are given a permanent number by the IAU's Minor Planet Center (MPC), and the discoverers can then submit names for them, following the IAU's naming conventions. The list below concerns those minor planets in the specified number-range that have received names, and explains the meanings of those names.

Official naming citations of newly named small Solar System bodies are approved and published in a bulletin by IAU's Working Group for Small Bodies Nomenclature (WGSBN). Before May 2021, citations were published in MPC's Minor Planet Circulars for many decades. Recent citations can also be found on the JPL Small-Body Database (SBDB). Until his death in 2016, German astronomer Lutz D. Schmadel compiled these citations into the Dictionary of Minor Planet Names (DMP) and regularly updated the collection.

Based on Paul Herget's The Names of the Minor Planets, Schmadel also researched the unclear origin of numerous asteroids, most of which had been named prior to World War II. This article incorporates text from this source, which is in the public domain: SBDB New namings may only be added to this list below after official publication as the preannouncement of names is condemned. The WGSBN publishes a comprehensive guideline for the naming rules of non-cometary small Solar System bodies.

Named minor planet	Provisional	This minor planet was named for...	Ref · Catalog
660798 Karltreusch	2002 TG_{391}	Karl Treusch, German Jesuit brother, a versatile specialist in Zeiss telescopes, and mechanical designer of the first precision photometer for observing variable stars at Vatican Observatory, where he worked until 1978.	IAU · 660798
660931 Antonpetrov	2003 OA_{34}	Anton Petrov, Canadian teacher of mathematics and a science journalist.	IAU · 660931
