= Anthony =

Name list

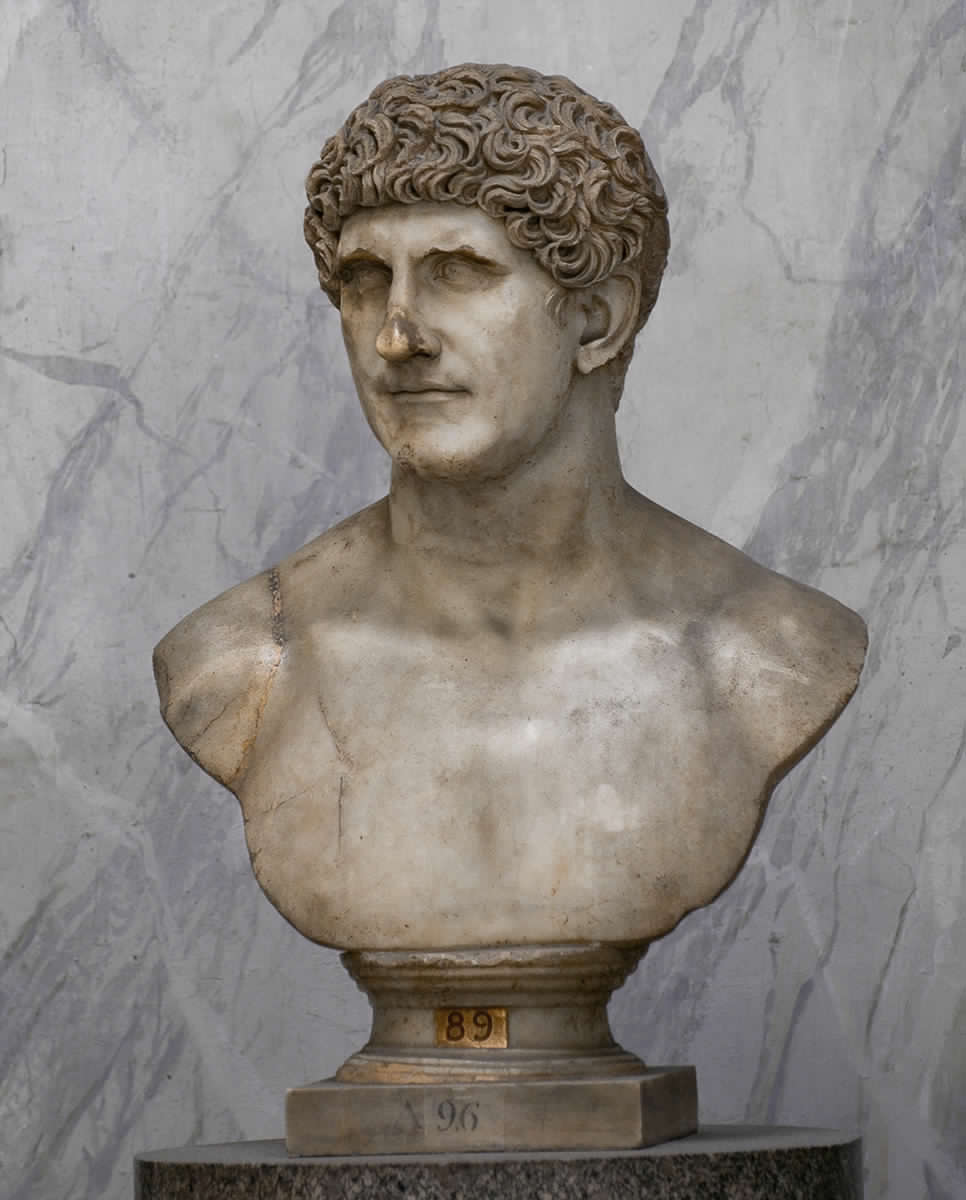
- Mark Antony
- Pronunciation: UK: /ˈæntəni/, US: /ˈænθəni/
- Gender: Male
- Language: English

Origin
- Languages: Latin, possibly from Etruscan
- Origin: Antonius

Other names
- Alternative spelling: Anthoni; Anthonie; Anthoney
- Variant forms: Antony; Antonio; Anton; Antonis; Antoine; Antun; Ante; Anto; Toni; Tony; Tonino
- Pet names: Ant, Anton, Antonino, Nino, Toni, Tony, Tone, Toño

Anthony, also spelled Antony, is a masculine given name derived from the Antonii, a Roman gens or clan that famously included Mark Antony (Marcus Antonius). The ultimate etymology of the name is unknown. Its popularity as a given name is largely due to the fame of Anthony the Great, an Egyptian hermit and saint who is often regarded as the first Christian monk. The later saint Anthony of Padua also contributed to its diffusion.

Equivalents include Antoine in French; Antonio in Italian and Spanish; António or Antônio in Portuguese; Anton in Dutch, German, Romanian, Russian, and the Scandinavian languages; Αντώνιος in Greek; Antal in Hungarian; Antoni in Polish and Slovene; and Antun or Ante in Croatian. English pet forms include Tony and Ant.

In the United States, it was the 43rd most popular male name in 2021, according to the Social Security Administration. Its popularity in the United Kingdom peaked during the 1940s; in 1944 it was the sixth most popular male name, and it was still as high as 14th in 1964.

== Spelling and pronunciation ==
The name was historically spelled Antony, as in William Shakespeare's play Antony and Cleopatra. The unetymological "h" was added in the 16th century, on the assumption that the name derived from the Greek word ἄνθος (anthos), meaning "flower". In Britain, the historical pronunciation /ˈæntəni/ predominates for both spellings, while in the United States the spelling pronunciation /ˈænθəni/ is more common when the "Anthony" spelling is used.

== Translations and variants ==
- Albanian: Andon (standard Albanian and Tosk Albanian dialect), Ndue (Gheg Albanian dialect), Anton
- Arabic: أنتوني، انطوان، انطون، طانيوس، طنّوس (Tannus, Tanyus, Aintun, Aintiwan, 'Antuni)
- Basque: Andoni, Antton
- Belarusian: Антон (Anton), Антось (Antos), Энтані (Entani)
- Bengali: এন্থনি (Ēnthoni), আন্তোনিও (Āntōni'ō)
- Bulgarian: Anton, Antoan, Andon, Doncho, Toni
- Catalan: Antoni, Toni
- Chinese: 安东尼 (simplified), 安東尼 (traditional) (Mandarin: Āndōngní, Cantonese: Ōndūngnèih)
- Croatian: Anton, Antonio, Antonijo, Antun, Ante, Anto, Tonči, Tonći, Toni
- Czech: Anton, Antonín, Tonik, Tonda
- Dalmatian: Tuone
- Danish: Anton, Anthon
- Dutch: Anton, Antoon, Antonie, Antonius, Teun, Teunis, Theun, Theunis, Ton, Toon
- English: Anthony, Antony, Antonio, Tony
- Esperanto: Antono, Anĉjo
- Estonian: Anton, Tõnis, Tõnu, Tõnn
- Filipino: Antonio, Antón, Onyo, Onying, Ton, Tonton, Tonio, Tonyo, Tunyíng
- Finnish: Anton, Anttoni, Antton, Antto, Toni
- French: Antoine, Antonin, Anthony
- Galician: Antón
- German: Anton, Toni, Antonius, Tünn
- Greek: Αντώνιος (Antó̱nios), Αντώνης (Antonis), Andonios, Andonis
- Gujarati: એન્થની (Ēnthanī)
- Hawaiian: Anakoni, Akoni
- Hebrew: אנטוני (ʾAnṭônî), טוני (Ṭônî)
- Hindi: एंथनी (Ēnthanī)
- Hungarian: Antal, Tóni
- Indonesian: Anthony, Antoninus, Toni, Antonio, Nino, Anton
- Irish: Antaine, Antoine, Antóin
- Italian: Antonio, Antonino, Antonello, Nino, Toni, Tonino, Tonio, Totò
- Japanese: アンソニー (Ansonī), アントン (Anton), アントニオ (Antonio)
- Kannada: ಆಂಟನಿ (Āṇṭani)
- Korean: 앤토니 (Aentoni)
- Latin: Antonius, Antoninus
- Latvian: Antonijs, Antons
- Lithuanian: Antanas
- Luxembourgish: Tun
- Macedonian: Anton, Antonij, Andon, Doncho
- Marathi: अंन्थोनी (Annthōnī)
- Malayalam: ആൻ്റണി (Antoni), അന്തോണി (Anthōṇī)
- Malta: Toni, Toninu, Ninu (Anthony)
- Mongolian: Антони (Antoni)
- Nepali: एन्थोनी (Ēnthōnī)
- Norwegian: Anton, Tønnes
- Persian: آنتونی (Antoni)
- Polish: Antoni, Antoniusz, Antonin, Antek, Antoś, Tolek, Tonek, Anton
- Portuguese: António (fem. Antónia), Antônio (fem. Antônia), and Antão, with diminutives Tó, Toino, Toni and Toninho.
- Romanian: Anton, Antonie
- Russian: Антон (Anton)
- Sami: Ante
- Serbian: Антоније (Antonije), Анто (Anto)
- Sheng: Anto, Toni
- Slovak: Anton, Tóno, Tónko (diminutive)
- Slovene: Anton, Tone
- Spanish: Antonio, Antón, Toni, Toño (diminutive)
- Swahili: Antoni, Antonio, Toni
- Swedish: Anton, Ante
- Sylheti: আন্তনি (Antoni)
- Tamil: அந்தோணி (Antōṇi)
- Telugu: ఆంథోనీ (Ānthōnī)
- Thai: แอนโทนี่ (Xæ n tho nī̀)
- Turkish: Antuvan
- Ukrainian: Антін (Antin), Антон (Anton), Антоній (Antonij)
- Urdu: انتھونی (Anthōnī)

== People ==
- Anthony I, Count of Oldenburg
- Anthony, King of Saxony
- Anthony of Kiev, monk and the founder of the monastic tradition in Kievan Rus'
- Anthony of Padua, Portuguese Catholic priest and friar of the Franciscan Order
- Anthony of Sourozh, Russian orthodox bishop and theological monk
- Anthony the Great, Egyptian Christian monk and hermit
- Anthony Ashley Cooper, 1st Earl of Shaftesbury, English politician and founder of the Whig party
- Anthony Ashley Cooper, 3rd Earl of Shaftesbury, English peer, Whig politician, philosopher and writer
- Anthony Ashley Cooper, 7th Earl of Shaftesbury, British Tory politician, philanthropist, and social reformer
- Anthony Ashley Cooper, 10th Earl of Shaftesbury, British peer
- Antony (footballer, born 2000), full name, Antony Matheus dos Santos, Brazilian footballer
- Antony (footballer, born 2001), full name, Antony Alves Santos, Brazilian footballer
- Anthony Seibu Alec Abban (1928–1985), Ghanaian politician
- Anthony Abbing, German-American blacksmith
- Anthony S. Abbott (1935–2020), American professor and writer
- Anthony Abdy, several people
- Anthony Abela, 20th century Maltese philosopher
- Anthony Abell (1906–1994), British colonial official
- Anthony Abrams (born 1979), Guyanese footballer
- Anthony Acampora, professor emeritus
- Anthony Accetturo (born 1938), American mobster
- Anthony Acevedo (1924–2018), U. S. Army officer
- Anthony Acid (born 1965), American DJ, producer, and remixer
- Anthony Ackroyd (born 1958), Australian comedian, speaker and writer
- Anthony Adaji (born 1964), Catholic bishop of Idah Diocese
- Anthony Adams, several people
- Anthony Adamson (1906–2002), Canadian architect, author, teacher, and municipal politician
- Anthony Kwami Adanuty, Ghanaian Catholic Bishop
- Anthony Addabbo (1960–2016), American actor and model
- Anthony Adderly (born 1968), Belizean football manager
- Anthony Addington, English physician
- Anthony Adducci (1937–2006), inventor and entrepreneur
- Anthony Adegbulugbe, Nigerian academic
- Anthony Adur (born 1988), Canadian soccer player
- Anthony Agbo (born 1954), Nigerian politician
- Anthony Agius Decelis, Maltese politician
- Anthony D'Agostino (1931–2017), Italian and American marine biologist
- Anthony Aguirre (born 1973), American cosmologist
- Anthony Aibel, American actor and musical director
- Anthony Aikman (1942–2011), British screenwriter and film director
- Anthony Ainley (1932–2004), British actor
- Anthony Aires (born 2004), Uruguayan football player
- Anthony B. Akers (1914–1976), American diplomat
- Anthony Akhulia, Kenyan football manager
- Anthony Akol, Ugandan politician
- Anthony Akoto Osei (1953–2023), Ghanaian politician
- Anthony Alabi (born 1981), American football player and actor
- Anthony Alaimo (1920–2009), American judge
- Anthony Alan-Williams (born 1947), British sprint canoer
- Anthony Albanese (born 1963), Prime Minister of Australia since 2022
- Anthony J. Alexander, American businessman
- Anthony Alfonso, American-born businessman
- Anthony Alford (born 1994), American baseball player
- Anthony Alfredo (born 1999), American stock car racing driver
- Anthony Alix (born 1986), Canadian gridiron football player
- Anthony Allaire (1829–1903), American police detective
- Anthony Allan, several people
- Anthony Allen, several people
- A. C. Alles, former judge of the Supreme Court of Sri Lanka
- Anthony Alleyne (born 1993), Barbadian cricketer
- Anthony Allison, several people
- A. J. Allmendinger (born 1981), American racing driver
- Anthony Allom (1938–2017), English cricketer
- Anthony Alofsin (born 1949), American architect
- Anthony Alonzo (1948–1998), Filipino actor, singer and politician
- Anthony Alozie (born 1986), Australian track and field sprinter
- Anthony Alridge (born 1984), American football player
- Anthony J. Alvarado (1942–2024), American educator and administrator
- Anthony Alves (born 1989), Portuguese rugby union player
- Anthony Amado (born 1963), American wrestler
- Anthony Amalfi (born 1967), Australian cricketer
- Anthony Amalraj (born 1986), Indian table tennis player
- Anthony Amaral (1930–1982), American historian and horse trainer
- Anthony Ameruso (1937–2006), American transportation commissioner
- Anthony Ammirati (born 2003), French pole vaulter
- Anthony Evans Amoah (born 1952), Ghanaian politician
- Anthony Amoroso, Italian-American chef
- Anthony Amory, Bermudian cricketer
- Anthony Ampaipitakwong (born 1988), Thai footballer
- Anthony G. Amsterdam (born 1935), American lawyer and law professor
- Anthony Anastasio (1906–1963), Italian-American mobster
- Anthony Anaxagorou (born 1983), British-born poet and writer
- Anthony Andeh (1945–2010), Nigerian boxer
- Anthony Anderson, several people
- Anthony Andre, American academic
- Anthony Andrews, several people
- Anthony Andrezeski (born 1947), American politician from Pennsylvania
- Anthony Anenih (1933–2018), Nigerian politician
- Anthony Ang (born 1978), Malaysian swimmer
- Anthony Angarola (1893–1929), American painter
- Anthony Angelini (born 1994), American entrepreneur
- Anthony Angello (born 1996), American ice hockey player
- Anthony Angély (born 1990), French association football player
- Anthony Ani (born 1936), Nigerian politician
- Anthony Aniagolu (1922–2011), Nigerian judge
- Anthony Annan (born 1986), Ghanaian footballer
- Anthony J. Antelo Devereux, American polo player
- Anthony Antico (1935–2020), American mobster
- Anthony Antoncich (1917–1998), recipient of the Distinguished Flying Medal
- Anthony Aoki (born 2000), Peruvian footballer
- Anthony Apesos (born 1953), American painter
- Anthony Apodaca, American computer graphics professional
- Anthony Appleyard (c. 1943–2022), Tolkien scholar
- Anthony Sablan Apuron (born 1945), former Catholic archbishop
- Anthony Aquino (born 1982), Canadian-born Italian ice hockey player
- Anthony Ardington (born 1940), English cricketer
- Anthony Joseph Arduengo III, American chemist
- Anthony Arena (born 1990), American soccer player
- Anthony Clark Arend (born 1958), American international relations scholar
- Anthony Peter Arida (1863–1955), Head of the Maronite Church (1932–1955)
- A. J. Arkell (1898–1980), British archaeologist and colonial administrator
- Anthony Arkwright, British spree killer
- Anthony Arlidge (1937–2023), British barrister and judge
- Anthony J. Armentano (1916–1987), American politician
- Anthony Armistead, Colonial Virginia planter and politician
- Anthony Armour (born 1982), American rugby league footballer
- Anthony Armstrong, several people
- Anthony Arnett (born 1958), American martial artist
- Anthony Arnull, British professor in law and researcher
- Anthony Arthur, several people
- Anthony Asael (born 1974), Belgian philosopher
- Anthony Asbury (born 1959), American actor
- Anthony Ascham, British academic, political theorist, Parliamentarian and diplomat
- Anthony Ashnault (born 1995), American freestyle wrestler and graduated folkstyle wrestler
- Anthony Asquith (1902–1968), English film director
- Anthony Aston, English actor and dramatist
- Anthony Atala (born 1958), American bioengineer and urologist
- Anthony Atamanuik (born 1974), American writer, actor and comedian
- Anthony Atolagbe (born 1965), Nigerian army general
- Anthony Athanas (1911–2005), Albanian-American restaurateur and philanthropist
- Anthony Atkins (born 1929), Barbadian cricketer
- Anthony Atkinson, several people
- Anthony Aubynn (born 1962), Ghanaian business executive
- Anthony Aucher, 17th century English politician
- Anthony Aufrère (1757–1833), English antiquary, barrister and translator
- Anthony T. Augelli (1902–1985), American judge
- Anthony Augustine (born 1980), Grenadian footballer
- Anthony Ausgang (born 1959), American painter
- Anthony Aveni (born 1938), American astronomer and anthropologist
- Anthony Avent (born 1969), American basketball player
- Anthony Averett (born 1994), American football player
- Anthony Ayine (born 1960), Nigerian public servant
- Anthony Aymard (born 1988), French footballer
- Anthony Azekwoh, Nigerian writer and visual artist
- Anthony Babington, several people
- Anthony Bacon, several people
- Anthony Baffoe (born 1965), Ghanaian footballer
- Anthony Bagnall (born 1945), Royal Air Force Air Chief Marshal
- Anthony Bailey, several people
- Anthony Baines (1912–1997), English organologist
- Anthony Bajada, American inventor
- Anthony Bajon (born 1994), French actor
- Anthony Balaam (born 1965), American serial killer
- Anthony Hugh Baldwin, British Army officer
- Anthony Bale, English medievalist
- Anthony Balfour (born 1949), Bahamian high jumper
- Anthony Ball, Anglican bishop and diplomat
- Anthony Jomah Ballah (born 1979), Liberian former footballer
- Anthony Bamford (born 1945), British businessman
- Anthony Banbury, American politician
- Anthony Bancarel (born 1971), French footballer
- Anthony Banda (born 1993), Mexican-American baseball player
- Anthony Banik (born 1973), Australian rules footballer
- Anthony Bannon (born 1943), American museum director
- Anthony Banua-Simon, American documentary film director and editor
- Anthony Banzi (1946–2020), Tanzanian bishop
- Anthony Barber, several people
- Anthony Barbosa (born 1989), Indian footballer
- Anthony Barboza, African-American artist and writer
- Anthony Barclay, British actor
- Anthony Bardaro (born 1992), Canadian-Italian ice hockey player
- Anthony Bardon (born 1993), Central midfielder for the Gibraltar national football team
- Anthony Barill (1933–2024), American politician
- Anthony Barker, several people
- Anthony Barness (born 1973), English association football player
- Anthony Barnett, several people
- Anthony David Barnosky (born 1952), American academic
- Anthony Baron (born 1992), Guadeloupean footballer
- Anthony Barr, several people
- Anthony Barrett, British chemist
- Anthony A. Barrett (born 1941), British-Canadian classical scholar and author
- Anthony Barrett (born 1991), Canadian football player
- Anthony Barrette (born 1986), Canadian football player
- Anthony Barrile, American actor
- Anthony R. Barringer (1925–2009), Canadian geologist
- Anthony Barrow, several people
- Anthony Barry (1901–1983), Irish politician and businessman
- Anthony Barry (born 1986), English football player and coach
- Anthony Borg Barthet (born 1947), Maltese judge
- Anthony Bartholomé (born 1982), French footballer
- Anthony Barylla (born 1997), German footballer
- Anthony Basile (born 1980), Panamanian footballer
- Anthony Bass (born 1987), American baseball player
- Anthony Bass (born 1975), American football player
- Anthony Bassano, Italian musician
- Anthony Bassey (born 1994), Nigerian footballer
- Anthony Basso (1979–2025), French footballer
- Anthony Bate (1927–2012), English actor
- Anthony Bateman, English merchant
- Anthony Bates (born 1961), English football referee
- Anthony Battaglia, several people
- Anthony J. Batten (1940–2020), Canadian visual artist
- Anthony Battishill (1937–2024), British civil servant
- Anthony Batts (born 1960), American police chief
- Anthony Baxter, several people
- Anthony Beale (born 1967), American politician
- Anthony Bean (born 1957), Australian botanist
- Anthony Beane (born 1994), American basketball player
- Anthony Beattie (1944–2014), British civil servant
- Anthony Beaumont-Dark (1932–2006), British politician
- Anthony Beauvillier (born 1997), Canadian ice hockey player
- Anthony Beavers (born 1963), American philosopher
- Anthony Bebbington, British-American geographer
- Anthony Becht (born 1977), American football player and coach
- Anthony Bedingfield, English merchant and politician
- Anthony Beeson, English iconographer
- Anthony Begina, Dutch politician
- Anthony Beilenson (1932–2017), American attorney and politician
- Anthony Bella (born 1973), Australian rugby league player
- Anthony Belleau (born 1996), French rugby union player
- Anthony A. Bellmon, American politician
- Anthony Belmonte (born 1995), French footballer
- Anthony Beltoise (born 1971), French auto racing driver
- Anthony Belton, American football player
- Anthony Bemboom (born 1990), American baseball player
- Anthony Bendel (born 1931), South African cricketer
- Anthony Bender (born 1995), American baseball player
- Anthony Benezet (1713–1784), French-born American abolitionist and teacher
- Anthony Benin (born 1975), Ghanaian judge
- Anthony Benjamin (1931–2002), English painter
- Anthony Benn, several people
- Anthony Benna (born 1987), French freestyle skier
- Anthony Bennett, several people
- Anthony Bentem (born 1990), Dutch footballer
- Anthony Berenstein (born 1997), Dutch footballer
- Anthony Ian Berkeley (1964–2001), American rapper and producer
- Anthony Bernal, American politician
- Anthony Bernard (1891–1963), English conductor, organist, pianist and composer
- Anthony Berry (1925–1984), British conservative politician
- Anthony Bertozzi (born 1966), American racing driver
- Anthony Bertram, British novelist and art historian
- Anthony Besanko (born 1954), Australian judge
- Anthony Best (born 1937), British businessman and engineer
- Anthony Ashley Bevan (1859–1933), British orientalist
- Anthony Bevilacqua (1923–2012), American cardinal
- Anthony Bevins (1942–2001), English journalist
- Anthony Bianchi (born 1958), Japanese politician
- Anthony Biase, several people
- Anthony Biddle, several people
- Anthony Bidulka (born 1962), Canadian writer
- Anthony Biekman (born 1994), Dutch professional footballer
- Anthony Bigeni (born 1963), New Zealand boxer
- Anthony Billingsley, Australian political analyst
- Anthony Bimba (1894–1982), Lithuanian-American political activist
- Anthony Blunt (1907–1983), British art historian and Soviet spy
- Anthony Binga Jr. (1843–1919), American minister and educator
- Anthony Bingham Mildmay, 2nd Baron Mildmay of Flete (1909–1950), English amateur jockey
- Anthony Birchak (born 1986), American mixed martial arts fighter
- Anthony Bird (1931–2016), British Anglican priest, physician and academic
- Anthony Birks (1941–2002), New Zealand army general
- Anthony Birley (1937–2020), British archaeologist
- Anthony Bitetto (born 1990), American ice hockey player
- Anthony "Tiny" Biuso (born 1970), American drummer
- Anthony S. Black (born 1951), American horse jockey
- Anthony Blackburn (born 1945), Royal Navy officer
- Anthony Blackwall (1672–1730), English classical scholar and schoolmaster
- Anthony Blackwood (born 1982), Welsh international rugby league footballer
- Anthony Blake, several people
- Anthony Blaylock (born 1965), American football player
- Anthony Bledsoe (1733–1788), American surveyor, politician and military colonel
- Anthony Lispenard Bleecker (1741–1816), U. S. banker and businessman
- Anthony Bleecker (1770–1827), American writer
- A. Bleecker Banks (1835–1910), American book publisher and politician
- Anthony Blevins (born 1976), American football player and coach
- Anthony Blond (1928–2008), British publisher and author
- Anthony Blondell (born 1994), Venezuelan footballer
- Anthony Blue (born 1964), American football player
- Anthony Blunt (1907–1983), British art historian and Soviet spy
- Anthony Bright Boadi-Mensah, Ghanaian politician
- Anthony Boakye-Yiadom, Ghanaian politician
- Anthony Osei Boakye (born 1949), Ghanaian politician
- Anthony Boam (1932–2023), British army general
- Anthony Boatswain, Grenadian politician
- Anthony Bogaert, Canadian psychologist
- Anthony Boheme, English actor
- Anthony Bolton (born 1950), British investment fund manager
- Anthony Bonaccurso (born 1975), Australian wheelchair tennis player
- Anthony Bonanno (born 1947), Maltese archaeologist
- Anthony Bond, several people
- Anthony Bondong, Ghanaian politician
- Anthony Bonner (born 1968), American basketball player
- Anthony Bonsante (born 1970), American boxer
- Anthony Bonus, Australian rugby league footballer
- Anthony Bonvisi, Italian emigrant to England
- Anthony Boone (American football) (born 1991), American gridiron football player
- Anthony Boone (born 1976), American basketball player and coach
- Anthony Boric (born 1983), New Zealand rugby union player
- Anthony Vanden Borre (born 1987), Belgian association football player
- Anthony Borrington (born 1948), English cricketer
- Anthony Borsumato (born 1973), British athlete
- Anthony G. Bosco (1927–2013), American prelate
- Anthony Boswell (born 2006), American football player
- Anthony Bottoms, British criminologist
- Anthony Bottrall (1938–2014), British diplomat
- Anthony Bouchard, American politician
- Anthony Boucher (1911–1968), American author, critic and editor
- Anthony Boulogne (born 1993), French politician
- Anthony Bourchier, 16th century English politician
- Anthony Bourdain (1956–2018), American celebrity chef, author and travel documentarian
- Anthony Bourne-Arton (1913–1996), British politician
- Anthony Bouthier (born 1992), French rugby union player
- Anthony Bowen (1809–1871), African-American civic leader in Washington D. C.
- Anthony Bowens (born 1990), American professional wrestler
- Anthony Bowie (born 1963), American basketball player
- Anthony Bowling (born 1982), American voice actor
- Anthony Boyle (born 1994), British actor
- Anthony Bozza, American journalist
- Anthony Bozzella (born 1965), American basketball coach
- Anthony Bradford (born 2001), American football player
- Anthony W. Bradley (1934–2021), British barrister
- Anthony B. Bradley, American theologian and academic
- Anthony N. Brady (1841–1913), American businessman
- Anthony Braga, American criminologist
- Anthony Braizat (born 1977), French football coach
- Anthony Bramall, English conductor
- Anthony Bramble (born 1990), Guyanese cricketer
- Anthony Brancato (1914–1951), American criminal
- Anthony Martin Branch (1823–1867), American politician
- Anthony Brand, 6th Viscount Hampden (1937–2008), British noble
- Anthony Brandt, American classical composer
- Anthony Branker (born 1958), American musician
- Anthony Brann (born 1970), Australian rugby league player
- Anthony Braxton (born 1945), American experimental composer, educator, music theorist, improviser and multi-instrumentalist
- Anthony Brea (born 1983), Venezuelan racing cyclist
- Anthony Brenner (born 1959), Canadian-born German ice hockey player
- Anthony Breslin, Irish footballer
- Anthony P. Bretscher (born 1950), British biologist
- Anthony Brewer, several people
- Anthony Breznican, American journalist and novelist
- Anthony Briançon (born 1994), French footballer
- Anthony Bridgman (1915–2006), military officer
- Anthony Bright (born 1977), American gridiron football player
- Anthony Brindisi (born 1978), American politician and lawyer
- Anthony Bringas, Filipino basketball player
- Anthony Briscoe (born 1978), English footballer
- Anthony Broadman, member of the Oregon State Senate
- Anthony Broadwater, American convicted and later exonerated of rape
- Anthony Brookby, English Franciscan theologian and Catholic martyr
- Anthony Brooke (1912–2011), Rajah Muda of Sarawak
- Anthony Michael Brooks (born 1993), American speed cubing champion
- Anthony Brooks (1922–2007), British espionage agent
- Anthony Brosse (born 1980), French politician
- Anthony Brown, several people
- Anthony Browne, several people
- Anthony Brummet (1931–2024), Canadian politician
- Anthony Bruodin, Irish Franciscan friar and philosopher
- Anthony Bryant, several people
- Anthony Bryceson (1934–2023), British academic
- Anthony Bryer (1937–2016), British historian
- Anthony Bucardo, American racing cyclist
- Anthony R. Bucco (1938–2019), American politician
- Anthony Buchanan (born 1955), Welsh rugby union player
- Anthony Buck, several people
- Anthony Buckeridge (1912–2004), English author
- Anthony Buckley (born 1937), Australian film editor and producer
- Anthony M. Bucco (born 1962), American Republic Party politician
- Anthony R. Bucco (1938–2019), American politician
- Anthony Buich (born 1978), American football player
- Anthony Bukoski, Polish-American author of short stories
- Anthony Bull (1908–2004), British transport engineer
- Anthony Buller, several people
- Anthony Bullick (born 1985), New Zealand cricketer
- Anthony Burch (born 1988), American author and podcaster
- Anthony Burger (1961–2006), American pianist and singer
- Anthony Burges (died 1664), English clergyman and writer
- Anthony Burgess (1917–1993), English writer and composer
- Anthony Joseph Burgess (1938–2013), Australian Roman Catholic bishop
- Anthony Burke, Australian architect and television presenter
- Anthony Burke, Irish cricketer and British Army officer
- Anthony D. Burke (born 1966), Australian political scientist
- Anthony Burns (1834–1862), American escaped slave
- Anthony Burton, several people
- Anthony Bushell (1904–1997), English actor
- Anthony Butler, several people
- Anthony Butt, New Zealand harness racer
- Anthony Butterworth, British immunologist
- Anthony Buttigieg, Maltese politician
- Anthony Buttimer (born 1965), Irish football referee
- Anthony Buttitta (1907–2004), American dramatist
- Anthony Butts (born 1969), American poet
- Anthony Buxton (1881–1970), British soldier and writer
- Anthony Byatt (1928–2014), English writer
- Anthony Byrne, several people
- Anthony Cacace (born 1989), Irish boxer
- Anthony Caceres (born 1992), Australian association football player
- Anthony Caci (born 1997), French association football player
- Anthony F. Caffrey, US attorney
- Anthony Cafiero (1900–1982), American politician
- Anthony O. Calabrese (1907–1991), American politician
- Anthony O. Calabrese Jr., American politician
- Anthony Calderbank, English translator
- Anthony Calf (born 1959), British actor
- Anthony Call, American television actor
- Anthony Callea (born 1982), Australian singer-songwriter and stage actor
- Anthony Calvano (born 1982), American soccer player
- Anthony Calvillo (born 1972), Canadian football and American coach
- Anthony Camal, American judoka
- Anthony Camara (born 1993), Canadian professional ice hockey player
- Anthony Camden (1938–2006), British oboist and academic administrator
- Anthony Caminetti (1854–1923), American politician
- Anthony J. Camp (born 1937), British genealogist
- Anthony Campanile (born 1982), American football coach
- Anthony Campbell, several people
- Anthony Cane (born 1961), Dean of Portsmouth Cathedral
- Anthony Cannataro (born 1965), American judge
- Anthony Cannella (born 1969), American politician
- Anthony Cannon (born 1984), American gridiron football player
- Anthony Canty (born 1991), German basketball player
- Anthony Capo (1959–2012), American mobster
- Anthony P. Capozzi (born 1945), American lawyer
- Anthony Carbines (born 1973), Australian politician
- Anthony Carbone (born 1974), Australian soccer player
- Anthony Card (born 1929), English cricketer
- Anthony Cardon (1772–1813), Flemish engraver in England
- Anthony Cardoza (1930–2015), American actor and film producer
- Anthony Carelli, American poet
- Anthony Carew (1889–?), Irish hurler
- Anthony Carfano (1895–1959), American gangster
- Anthony Carleton, 16th century English politician
- Anthony Carlino, American set decorator
- Anthony Carmona (born 1953), president of Trinidad and Tobago (2013–2018)
- Anthony Caro (1924–2013), English sculptor
- Anthony Carollo (1923–2007), American mob boss
- Anthony Carr, several people
- Anthony Carrigan, several people
- Anthony Carritt, anti-fascist revolutionary from Oxford, England, member of the International Brigades
- Anthony Carson, several people
- Anthony Carter, several people
- Anthony Cartwright, several people
- Anthony Caruso, several people
- Anthony Cary, 5th Viscount Falkland (1656–1694), British politician and nobleman
- Anthony J. Casale (born 1947), American politician
- Anthony Casamento (1920–1987), US Marine Corps Medal of Honor recipient
- Anthony W. Case, American astrophysicist
- Anthony J. Casey, American legal scholar
- Anthony Casey, Irish Gaelic footballer
- Anthony Cashmore, American biochemist and plant molecular biologist
- Anthony Cassar (born 1996), American wrestler
- Anthony Casso (1942–2020), Italian American mobster
- Anthony Castonzo (born 1988), American football player
- Anthony Castro, several people
- Anthony Catanese, American academic administrator
- Anthony Catt (1933–2018), English cricketer
- Anthony Cavalcante (1897–1966), American politician
- Anthony Cavendish (1927–2013), British MI6 officer
- Anthony Cekada (1951–2020), American priest and author
- Anthony Celino (born 1972), Filipino-American Catholic bishop
- Anthony J. Celebrezze (1910–1998), American judge
- Anthony J. Celebrezze Jr. (1941–2003), American politician
- Anthony Cellier (born 1975), French politician
- Anthony Cerami (born 1940), American entrepreneur and medical research scientist
- Anthony Cesario (1976–2010), American football player
- Anthony Chabot (1813–1888), American businessman aka "Water King"
- Anthony Chalençon (born 1990), French cross-country skier and biathlete
- Anthony Chamier, English official, financier and politician
- Anthony Champion (1725–1801), English poet and politician
- Anthony Champney, English Roman Catholic priest and controversialist
- Anthony Chan, several people
- Anthony Chanona (born 1954), Belizean politician
- Anthony Charles (born 1981), English footballer
- Anthony Charteau (born 1979), French cyclist
- Anthony Chase, academic specialist in human rights
- Anthony Chavez (born 1970), American baseball player
- Anthony Chebatoris (1898–1938), American bank robber
- Anthony Checchia (1930–2024), American art administrator
- Anthony Cheetham (born 1946), British materials scientist
- Anthony Cheetham (born 1943), British publisher
- Anthony Chemero, American philosopher
- Anthony Chemut (born 1992), Kenyan middle-distance runner
- Anthony Chen (born 1984), Singaporean film director
- Anthony Chenevix-Trench (1919–1979), headmaster of Bradfield College and Eton College
- Anthony Cherrington (born 1988), New Zealand rugby league footballer
- Anthony Cheshire, Australian scientist and public servant
- Anthony Chesley (born 1996), American football player
- Anthony Cheung (born 1952), Hong Kong politician and academic
- Anthony Cheung (born 1982), American composer
- Anthony Chez (1872–1937), American sports coach and administrator
- Anthony Chiappone (born 1957), American Democratic Party politician
- Anthony Chiasson (born 1973), American hedge fund manager
- Anthony Chickillo (born 1992), American football player
- Anthony Chinasa-Abiola, Nigerian politician
- Anthony Chinn (1930–2000), Guyanese actor
- Anthony Chirayath (born 1941), Syro-Malabar prelate
- Anthony Chisholm, several people
- Anthony Chivers (sport shooter) (born 1936), British sports shooter
- Anthony Chivers (1920–2015), English athlete
- Anthony Chlopek (1880–1937), American labor union leader
- Anthony Chong (born 1940), Malaysian long jumper
- Anthony Christopher, several people
- Anthony Chubb (1915–2007), South African cricketer
- Anthony Chute, English poet and pamphleteer
- Anthony F. Ciampi (1816–1893), Italian Jesuit educator
- Anthony Cianflone, Australian politician
- Anthony Ciccone (born 1934), American mobster
- Anthony Cimini (1922–1987), American politician
- Anthony J. Cimino (born 1947), American politician
- Anthony Cioffi (born 1994), American football player
- Anthony Cipriano (born 1975), American film producer
- Anthony Circelli (born 1961), Italian ice hockey player
- Anthony Cirelli (born 1997), Canadian ice hockey player
- Anthony J. Cirone, musical artist
- Anthony Cistaro (born 1963), American actor
- Anthony Ciulla, American criminal
- Anthony Civella (1930–2006), American mobster and head of the Kansas City crime family
- Anthony Civet (born 1997), French footballer
- Anthony Claggett (born 1984), American baseball player
- Anthony Clare (1942–2007), Irish psychiatrist
- Anthony Mary Claret (1807–1870), Spanish archbishop
- Anthony Clark, several people
- Anthony Clarke, several people
- Anthony Clarvoe, American playwright
- Anthony Cleaver (born 1938), British engineer and executive
- Anthony Clement (born 1976), American football player
- Anthony Clemmons (born 1994), American basketball player
- Anthony Coburn (1927–1977), Australian television writer and producer
- A. O. J. Cockshut (1927–2021), British academic and author
- Anthony Cohen, British anthropologist
- Anthony Cokett, English politician
- Anthony Colaizzo (1930–2019), American politician
- Anthony Colandrea (born 2004), American football quarterback
- Anthony Colbert (1934–2007), British illustrator and painter
- Anthony Colby (1792–1873), American businessman and politician
- Anthony Coldeway (1887–1963), American screenwriter
- Anthony Cole, several people
- Anthony Colella (born 1975), Australian professional footballer
- Anthony Coleman (born 1955), American jazz pianist
- Anthony Coleman (born 1964), American football player
- Anthony Coleman (born 1982), American basketball player
- Anthony Colinet (born 1976), French footballer
- Anthony Collins, several people
- Anthony Colly, 16th century English politician
- Anthony Colón (born 1952), Puerto Rican middle-distance runner
- Anthony Colucci (born c. 1991), American football coach
- Anthony Colve (c. 1644–1693), Dutch military officer, governor of Netherlands
- Anthony Comstock (1844–1915), American morals critic
- Anthony Condon (born 1967), Australian rules footballer
- Anthony Conroy (1895–1978), American ice hockey player
- Anthony Contreras (born 2000), Costa Rican football player
- Anthony Cook, several people
- Anthony Coombs, several people
- Anthony Cooper, several people
- Anthony Coote, English musician
- Anthony Cope, several people
- Anthony Copeland (born 1963), American football player
- Anthony Copley, English Catholic poet and conspirator
- Anthony Corallo (1913–2000), American mobster
- Anthony Corbeill (born 1960), American professor of classics
- Anthony Corbett (born 1962), Jamaican football player
- Anthony Cordesman (1939–2024), American national security analyst
- Anthony Corley (born 1960), American football player
- Anthony Cormier, American journalist
- Anthony Cornero (1899–1955), American bootlegger and gambling entrepreneur
- Anthony Cornwell (1929–2017), English cricketer
- Anthony Correia, multiple people
- Anthony Corrie (born 1984), Australian rules footballer
- Anthony Cortese (born 1947), American health and environmental official
- Anthony Corvino (born 1965), American football player
- Anthony Cosmo, several people
- Anthony Costa (born 1994), Australian soccer player
- Anthony Roth Costanzo (born 1982), American countertenor
- Anthony Costello (born 1953), British pediatrician
- Anthony Cotton, multiple people
- Anthony Cottrell (1907–1988), New Zealand international rugby union player
- Anthony Cottrell (1806–1860), Australian farmer
- Anthony Coulls, British museum curator and historian
- Anthony de Countie, composer and lutenist
- Anthony Courage, British Army general
- Anthony Coutinho (born 1940), Indian sprinter
- Anthony Cowan Jr. (born 1997), American basketball player
- Anthony Cox, several people
- Anthony Coyle, several people
- Anthony Cracherode (1674–1752), British Member of Parliament
- Anthony Crane, several people
- Anthony Crank (born 1974), British television presenter
- Anthony Crastus (born 1985), French horse racing jockey
- Anthony Crawford, several people
- Anthony Creevey, Irish former politician
- Anthony Creighton (1922–2005), British actor and writer
- Anthony Crickmay (1937–2020), British dance photographer
- Anthony Cristiano, Canadian film director
- Anthony Crivello (born 1955), American actor
- Anthony Crockett (bishop) (1945–2008), West Anglican bishop
- Anthony Crockett (1754–1838), American soldier and politician
- Anthony Crofts, English politician
- Anthony Crolla (born 1986), British boxer
- Anthony Cronin (1923–2016), Irish poet, arts activist, writer and barrister
- Anthony Crosby, English artist and barrister’s clerk from London
- Anthony Crosland (1918–1977), British Labour Party politician and author
- Anthony Cross, multiple people
- Anthony Crosse, Irish hurler
- Anthony Crossley (born 1939), Rhodesian sailor
- Anthony Crossley (1903–1939), British politician
- Anthony Crowley, Australian playwright
- Anthony G. Crutchfield (born 1960), retired U. S. Army lieutenant general, executive of Boeing
- Anthony R. Cucci (1922–2015), American politician
- Anthony Cudahy (born 1989), American painter
- Anthony Cuff (born 1957), New Zealand cyclist
- Anthony Cullis (1946–2021), British electrical engineer
- Anthony J. Culyer (born 1942), British economist
- Anthony Cumia (born 1961), American talk radio broadcaster
- Anthony Cunningham (born 1965), Galway hurler; Gaelic football manager; hurling manager
- Anthony Curcio (born 1980), American author, public speaker, convicted robber, and former career criminal
- Anthony Curtiss (1910–1981), American naturalist
- Anthony Czarnik (born 1957), American biochemist and inventor
- Anthony Daasan (born 1977), Indian folk singer
- Anthony Dablé (born 1988), American football player
- Anthony Christian Dadzie (born 1962), Ghanaian politician
- Anthony Dafaa (born 1988), Kenyan footballer
- Anthony Daigle (born 1970), American football player
- Anthony Daly, several people
- Anthony Daniel’s, several people
- Anthony Daniher (born 1963), Australian rules footballer
- Anthony Danze (born 1984), Australian footballer
- Anthony Darcy (born 1972), Australian rules footballer
- Anthony Davidson (born 1979), British racing driver
- Anthony Davies (born 1969), Welsh snooker player
- Anthony Davis, several people
- Anthony C. Davison (born 1958), British statistician
- Anthony Dawes (1928–2021), English actor
- Anthony Dawson, several people
- Anthony Day (1933–2007), American journalist
- Anthony De Ceglie, Western Australian journalist and newspaper editor
- Anthony De La Torre, American actor
- Anthony De Longis (born 1950), American actor
- Anthony J. DeMaria (born 1931), American physicist and engineer
- Anthony de Mello, multiple people
- Anthony Lewis De Rose (1803–1836), American painter
- Anthony De Sa (1915–1969), Indian actor and singer
- Anthony De Sa, multiple people
- Anthony Deane, several people
- Anthony DeCurtis (born 1951), American author and music critic
- Anthony DeGrate (born 1973), American football player
- Anthony Del Col (born 1977), Canadian-born writer
- Anthony Delaplace (born 1989), French road cyclist
- Anthony Delcollo, American politician
- Anthony Delhalle (1982–2017), French motorcycle racer
- Anthony Delon (born 1964), French actor
- Anthony DeLuca, several people
- Anthony J. DeMaria (born 1931), American physicist and engineer
- Anthony Denham (born 1991), American football player
- Anthony Denison (born 1949), American actor
- Anthony Denison-Smith (born 1942), British Army general
- Anthony Denman (born 1979), American football player
- Anthony Denness (1936–2008), English cricketer
- Anthony Dennis (born 2004), Nigerian footballer
- Anthony Denny (1501–1549), English politician
- Anthony Dent, American songwriter and producer
- Anthony J. DePace (1892–1977), American architect
- Anthony DePalma (born 1952), American journalist and reporter
- Anthony F. DePalma (1904–2005), American orthopedic surgeon and professor
- Anthony Deroin (born 1979), French professional footballer
- Anthony DeRosa (born 1959), American animator
- Anthony Derouard (born 1992), French footballer
- Anthony Derricks (born 1976), American football player
- Anthony DeSando (born 1965), American actor
- Anthony DeSclafani (born 1990), American baseball player and pitcher
- Anthony Descotte (born 2003), Belgian footballer
- Anthony DeSimone, American politician
- Anthony DeSpirito (1935–1975), American thoroughbred horse racing jockey
- Anthony DeStefano (born 1965), American writer
- Anthony Devas (1911–1958), British painter
- Anthony Devis (1729–1816), English painter
- Anthony DeVitis (born 1965), American politician
- Anthony Dexter (1913–2001), American actor
- Anthony Dharson (born 1960), Trinidadian cricketer
- Anthony Di Biase (born 1988), Canadian soccer player
- Anthony Di Fiore, primatologist
- Anthony Di Lallo (born 1988), Belgian footballer
- Anthony Di Pietro (born 1969), Australian businessman and soccer promoter
- Anthony Diallo (born 1956), Tanzanian politician
- Anthony Dias Blue (1942–2023), American author and columnist
- Anthony J. Dias, retired ExxonMobil materials scientist
- Anthony Lancelot Dias (1910–2002), Indian politician and ICS officer
- Anthony DiBlasi, American film director
- Anthony Dickenson (born 1952), British professor of neuropharmacology
- Anthony Dickerson (1957–2019), American gridiron football player
- Anthony Dickey, American hairstylist
- Anthony R. Dickinson, British neuroscientist
- Anthony DiCosmo (born 1977), American football player
- Anthony DiDonato (1911–1989), American politician
- Anthony Diekema, American college president
- Anthony G. DiFalco (born 1938), American politician
- Anthony DiFruscia (born 1940), American politician
- Anthony DiGiorgio (1940–2020), American academic administrator
- Anthony Dilweg (born 1965), American football player
- Anthony DiMaria, American actor, director and producer
- Anthony DiMarzo, American lacrosse player
- Anthony Dimond (1881–1953), American judge
- Anthony DiPaolo (born 1958), American businessman
- Anthony Dirrell (born 1984), American boxer
- Anthony J. DiSilvestro (1904–1969), American politician
- Anthony Dixon (born 1987), American football player
- Anthony Dobbins (born 1981), American-Italian basketball player
- Anthony Doerr, American writer
- Anthony R. Dolan (born 1948), American journalist
- Anthony Dominique (born 1969), association football player
- Anthony Don, Australian rugby league try soccer
- Anthony Donelan (1846–1924), British Army officer and politician
- Anthony Dopping (1643–1697), Irish Anglican priest
- Anthony Doria, academic institution founder
- Anthony Dorsett (born 1973), American gridiron football player
- Anthony Douglas (born 1985), British speed skater
- Anthony Dowell (born 1943), British ballet dancer
- Anthony Downs, American horse racing track
- Anthony Downs (1930–2021), American economist
- Anthony Drake (1941–2022), English schoolteacher and designer of Saskatchewan flag
- Anthony Drawhorn (born 1965), American gridiron football player
- Anthony Drazan, American film director and screenwriter
- Anthony Drennan (born 1958), Irish guitarist
- Anthony Drewe, British lyricist and book writer
- Anthony Joseph Drexel (1826–1893), American banker
- Anthony Drmic (born 1992), Australian basketball player
- Anthony Duclair (born 1995), Canadian ice hockey player
- Anthony Dudley (born 1996), English footballer
- Anthony Dudley (judge), Gibraltarian barrister and judge
- Anthony Dunne, designer and academic
- Anthony Durante (1967–2003), American professional wrestler
- Anthony Durier (1832–1904), French-born American prelate
- Anthony Durnford (1830–1879), British Army officer
- Anthony Duruji (born 1998), American basketball player
- Anthony Dymock (born 1949), Royal Navy admiral
- Anthony Dyott, English politician
- Anthony Dyson, several people
- Anthony Dzamefe, Ghanaian businessman
- Anthony Ealy, American politician
- Anthony Earnshaw (1924–2001), English artist
- Anthony Eaton, Australian writer
- Anthony van der Eb (1813–1852), Dutch civil servant
- Anthony Echemendia (born 1999), Cuban wrestler
- Anthony Eddy, rugby player
- Anthony Eden (1897–1977), British soldier, diplomat and politician
- Anthony Edgar (born 1990), English footballer
- Anthony Edwards, several people
- Anthony Effah (born 1960), Ghanaian politician
- Anthony Egan, Gaelic footballer
- Anthony Egwunyenga (born 1943), Nigerian sprinter
- Anthony Eickhoff (1827–1901), American politician
- Anthony Eisley (1925–2003), American actor
- Anthony Ekert, rugby player
- Anthony Ekezia Ilonu (1937–2012), Roman Catholic Bishop
- Anthony Elanga (born 2002), Swedish professional footballer
- Anthony Elding (born 1982), English footballer
- Anthony Elechi (born 1993), American professional basketball player
- Anthony Elgindy (1967–2015), rogue trader
- Anthony Elkins, British corporate executive
- Anthony Elliger (1701–1781), Dutch painter
- Anthony Elliott (born 1981), English rugby union player
- Anthony Ellis, several people
- Anthony Ellison, New Zealand cartoonist and animator
- Anthony Ellul, Maltese judge
- Anthony Ellys (1690–1761), English bishop
- Anthony Elms, American independent curator, writer and artist
- Anthony Elujoba (born 1948), Nigerian academics
- Anthony Emeka (born 1990), Nigerian footballer
- Anthony Emmett (c. 1790–1872), British Army officer
- Anthony Enahoro (1923–2010), Nigerian politician, Adolor of Uromi
- Anthony Endrey (1922–2010), Hungarian-Australian lawyer and author
- Anthony England (born 1986), English former rugby league footballer
- Anthony W. England (born 1942), American astronaut and geophysicist
- Anthony Eze Enwereuzor, Nigerian politician
- Anthony Epstein (1921–2024), British virologist
- Anthony Erdélyi, Hungarian nobleman
- Anthony Ervin (born 1981), American swimmer
- Anthony Eskenzi, British politician
- Sir Anthony Esmonde, 15th Baronet (1899–1981), Irish politician
- Anthony Esolen (born 1959), American writer, social commentator, translator of classical poetry, and Distinguished Professor of Humanities
- Anthony Etherin, British experimental poet
- Anthony Étrillard (born 1993), French rugby union player
- Anthony Ettrick (1622–1703), English politician
- Anthony Eustrel (1902–1979), English actor
- Anthony Evans, several people
- Anthony Everitt (born 1940), British author
- Anthony Eviparker (born 1985), Nigerian footballer
- Anthony Ewbank (1925–2011), British judge
- Anthony Ewherido, Catholic Bishop of Warri diocese
- Anthony Eyre, several people
- Anthony Eyton (born 1923), British artist
- Anthony Fabian, British film producer
- Anthony Fabiano (born 1993), American football player
- Anthony Fahden (born 1986), American rower
- Anthony Fainga'a (born 1987), Australian rugby union player
- Anthony Patrick Fairall (1943–2008), South African astronomer
- Anthony Falco, American chef and author
- Anthony Falson (born 1953), Australian water polo player
- Anthony Famiglietti (born 1978), American track and field athlete
- Anthony Fane, multiple people
- Anthony Fantano (born 1985), American music critic and YouTuber
- Anthony Farace (born 1976), American soccer player
- Anthony Farage (1885–1963), Catholic bishop
- Anthony Farah, Lebanese international rugby league player
- Anthony Faramus (1920–1990), British author and concentration camp survivor
- Anthony Farindon (1598–1658), English royalist divine
- Anthony Farnell, British boxer
- Anthony Farquhar (1940–2023), Irish Roman Catholic Bishop
- Anthony Farrar-Hockley (1924–2006), British Army general
- Anthony Q. Farrell (born 1977), Canadian comedian, actor and writer
- Anthony Farrell (born 1969), English rugby league coach and former England and Wales international rugby league footballer
- Anthony Farry, Australian field hockey coach
- Anthony Fasano (born 1984), American football player
- Anthony Fauci (born 1940), American physician—scientist and immunologist
- Anthony Favell (born 1939), British politician
- Anthony Favre (born 1984), Swiss footballer
- Anthony Federici (1940–2022), American alleged mobster
- Anthony Federico (born 1997), Canadian gridiron football player
- Anthony Fedorov (born 1985), American actor and singer
- Anthony Feinstein (born 1956), neuropsychiatrist
- Anthony S. Fell (born 1939), Canadian businessman
- Anthony Fels (born 1964), Australian politician
- Anthony Fera (born 1991), American gridiron football player
- Anthony Fernandes (1936–2023), prelate of the Catholic Church
- Anthony Soter Fernandez (1932–2020), Malaysian Catholic archbishop
- Anthony C. Ferrante, American film director
- Anthony Ferrari (born 1978), American baseball player
- Anthony Fiala (1869–1950), American explorer
- Anthony Fiato, American mobster
- Anthony Field (born 1963), Australian musician, actor, songwriter and producer
- Anthony Fieldings (born 1971), American gridiron football player
- Anthony Finigan (1926–2009), British actor
- Anthony Finkelstein (born 1959), British software engineer
- Anthony Finnerty, Gaelic footballer
- Anthony Fiorillo, American paleontologist
- Anthony Firingee, Indian singer, writer and folk poet
- Anthony Firkser (born 1995), American football player
- Anthony Fisher, several people
- Anthony FitzClarence, 7th Earl of Munster (1926–2000), British graphic designer and hereditary peer
- Anthony Fitzherbert (1470–1538), English judge, scholar and legal author
- Anthony Flamini (born 1978), American freelance comic book writer
- Anthony Flanagan (born 1972), British actor
- Anthony Fleet (born 1965), Australian darts player
- Anthony A. Fleger (1900–1963), American politician
- Anthony Fleming, American actor
- Anthony Fletcher, 17th century English historian
- Anthony Flinn, British chef
- Anthony Floch (born 1983), French rugby union player
- Anthony Flood (born 1984), Irish footballer
- Anthony Florence (born 1966), American football player
- Anthony Flower (1792–1875), Canadian artist
- Anthony Floyd (born 1981), American football player
- Anthony Fok, Singaporean tutor
- Anthony Fokker (1880–1939), Dutch aviation pioneer, aviation entrepreneur, aircraft designer, and aircraft manufacturer
- Anthony Foley (1973–2016), Irish rugby Union footballer and coach
- Anthony Fontana (born 1999), American soccer player
- Anthony Forde, several people
- Anthony Foriest, American politician
- Anthony G. Forlini (born 1962), American politician from Michigan
- Anthony Alexander Forrest (1884–1901), Austrian footballer and soldier
- Anthony Forrest (c. 1590s-c. 1620s), English politician
- Anthony Forson, Ghanaian lawyer, politician and diplomat
- Anthony Forster, several people
- Anthony Forwood (1915–1988), British actor
- Anthony Foster (1953–2017), Australian activist
- Anthony Foster (c. 1705–1779), Anglo-Irish politician and judge
- Anthony Fothergill, several people
- Anthony Fournier (born 1989), French footballer
- Anthony Fowler (born 1991), English amateur boxer
- Anthony Fox, Irish writer, producer, director and actor
- Anthony Foxx (born 1971), American politician and lawyer
- Anthony Foyt, multiple people
- Anthony Franchina (born 1977), Australian rules footballer
- Anthony Franchini (1898–1997), American guitarist
- Anthony Franciosa (1928–2006), American actor
- Anthony de Francisci (1887–1964), Italian-American sculptor
- Anthony M. Frank (1931–2022), American banker and politician
- Anthony Freda, American illustrator
- Anthony Frederick (1964–2003), American basketball player
- Anthony Freeling (born 1956), British management consultant, marking expert, university administrator and academic
- Anthony Freeman (1988–2018), American religious writer
- Anthony de Freitas (born 1994), French footballer
- Anthony French, British rower
- Anthony French (1920–2017), British-born physicist and educator
- Anthony Frew (1955–2018), British pulmonologist
- Anthony Frewin, British writer and personal assistant
- Anthony Friedkin, American photographer
- Anthony Froshaug (1920–1984), English typographer, teacher and designer
- Anthony Frost (born 1951), English painter
- Anthony Fry, multiple people
- Anthony Furlong (born 1978), American professional skateboarder
- Anthony Gadd (1917–1996), British bobsledder
- Anthony Gadie (1868–1949), English businessman and politician
- Anthony Gaeta (1927–1988), American politician
- Anthony Gaggi (1925–1988), American criminal
- Anthony H. Gair (1948–2023), American lawyer
- Anthony Gaitor (born 1988), American football player
- Anthony Gale (born 1993), Canadian ice sledge hockey player
- Anthony Galea (born 1959), Canadian physician
- Anthony Galindo (1978–2020), Venezuelan musical artist
- Anthony Galla-Rini (1904–2006), American accordion and composer
- Anthony J. Gallela, American game designer
- Anthony Gallo (born 1965), American guitarist
- Anthony E. Gallo (born 1939), American playwright
- Anthony D. Galluccio (born 1967), American politician
- Anthony Galsworthy (born 1944), British diplomat
- Anthony Gangone, American professional wrestler
- Anthony du Gard Pasley, landscape architect and garden designer
- Anthony W. Gardner (1820–1885), former President of Liberia
- Anthony Gardner (footballer) (born 1980), English association football player
- Anthony L. Gardner (born 1963), American politician
- Anthony Gargiulo (born 1984), American gridiron football player
- Anthony Gargrave (1926–1998), Canadian politician
- Anthony Garofoli, American politician and attorney
- Anthony Garotinho (born 1960), Brazilian politician
- Anthony Gaspar Lagwen, Tanzanian Catholic prelate
- Anthony Gates, Australian judge
- Anthony Gatto (born 1973), American juggler
- Anthony Gauvin (born 1973), French footballer and manager
- Anthony Gaw (1941–1999), Hong Kong businessman
- Anthony P. Gawronski (1900–c. 1972), American lawyer and politician
- Anthony V. Gazzara (born 1937), American politician
- Anthony Gbuji (born 1931), Nigerian bishop emeritus
- Anthony Geary (1947–2025), American actor
- Anthony Gelling (born 1990), Cook Islands international rugby league footballer
- Anthony Vincent Genovese (born 1932), American architect
- Anthony J. Genovesi (1936–1998), American politician
- Anthony C. George (1938–2024), Grenadian artist
- Anthony George (1921–2005), American actor
- Anthony Georgiou (born 1997), Cypriot footballer
- Anthony Geraci, American musician
- Anthony Germain, Canadian politician
- Anthony Gerrard (born 1986), English association football player
- Anthony Geslin (born 1980), French cyclist
- Anthony Giacalone (1919–2001), American criminal
- Anthony Giacchino, American documentary filmmaker
- Anthony Giacobazzi (born 1988), French rugby union player
- Anthony Giacoppo (born 1986), Australian cyclist
- Anthony Gianelly (1936–2009), American orthodontist
- Anthony Giannone, American racing driver
- Anthony Giardina, American dramatist
- Anthony Giddens (born 1938), English sociologist
- Anthony Gifford (1921–2016), Australian cricketer, British Army officer and educator
- Anthony Gifford, 6th Baron Gifford (born 1940), British hereditary peer and King's Counsel
- Anthony Gignac, Colombian-American con artist
- Anthony Gilbert, several people
- Anthony Gilby, English clergyman
- Anthony Gilchrist McCall (1895–1978), Indian Civil Service officer and military officer
- Anthony Gildès (1856–1941), French actor
- Anthony Gill, several people
- Anthony Gillet (born 1976), French race-walker
- Anthony B. Gioffre (1907–1996), New York politician
- Anthony H. Gioia (born 1942), American businessman and diplomat
- Anthony Giordano (1914–1980), American mobster
- Anthony Giuliano (1898–1970), American politician
- Anthony Gizzo (1902–1953), American mobster
- Anthony Glavin (1945–2006), Irish poet and professor of music
- Anthony Gleeson, Irish hurler and Gaelic footballer
- Anthony Glennon (born 1999), English footballer
- Anthony Glover, basketball player
- Anthony Gobert (1975–2024), Australian motorcycle racer
- Anthony F. Godfrey (born 1961), American diplomat
- Anthony Goelzer (born 1998), French footballer
- Anthony Goldbloom (born 1983), American businessman
- Anthony Goldstone (1944–2017), English pianist
- Anthony Goldwire (born 1971), American basketball player
- Anthony Golez, Filipino politician
- Anthony Gomes (born 1970), Canadian musical artist
- Anthony Gomez (born 1981), American wrestler, kickboxer and mixed martial arts fighter
- Anthony Gomez Mancini (born 2001), French footballer
- Anthony Gonçalves (born 1986), French footballer
- Anthony Gonsalves (1927–2012), Indian composer
- Anthony Gonzalez, several people
- Anthony Goodenough (born 1941), British diplomat
- Anthony Goodman, several people
- Anthony Gordon, several people
- Anthony Gorruso (born 1957), American jazz trumpeter
- Anthony Gose (born 1990), American baseball player
- Anthony Gosselin (born 1992), Canadian gridiron football player
- Anthony Gould, multiple people
- Anthony Grabiner, Baron Grabiner (born 1945), British lawyer
- Anthony A. Grace, American neuroscientist
- Anthony Grady (born 1990), American football player
- Anthony Grafton (born 1950), American historian
- Anthony Graham (born 1957), Canadian businessman
- Anthony Grandison (born 1953), American drug dealer and murderer
- Anthony Grant, several people
- A. C. Grayling (born 1949), English philosopher
- Anthony Graziano (1940–2019), American mobster
- Anthony Greco (born 1993), American ice hockey player
- Anthony Green, several people
- Anthony Greenfield (1931–2004), British sports shooter
- Anthony Greenwald, American psychologist
- Anthony Gregg (born 1986), American poker player
- Anthony Gregory (born 1981), American historian and author
- Anthony Karl Gregory (born 1966), Icelandic footballer
- Anthony Greville-Bell (1920–2008), Australian sculptor and scriptwriter
- Anthony Grey, several people
- Anthony Dean Griffey (born 1970), American opera tenor
- Anthony Griffin, several people
- Anthony Griffith, several people
- Anthony Griffiths, several people
- Anthony Griggs (born 1960), American football player
- Anthony E. Grillo (1915–1999), American judge
- Anthony Grooms, American writer
- Anthony Groppi (born 1997), Italian motorcycle racer
- Anthony Gross (1905–1984), British printmaker
- Anthony Norris Groves (1795–1853), British missionary
- Anthony Grundy (1979–2019), American basketball player
- Anthony Gruszka (1910–1972), American politician
- Anthony Guarisco Jr. (born 1938), American politician
- Anthony Gubbay (born 1932), Zimbabwean judge
- Anthony Guest, British barrister and legal scholar
- Anthony Gueterbock, 18th Baron Berkeley (born 1939), member of the House of Lords
- Anthony Guidera (born 1964), American actor
- Anthony Guise (born 1985), French footballer
- Anthony Gumbiner, British businessman
- Anthony Nogeh Gumbek, Malaysian politician
- Anthony Günther, multiple people
- Anthony Gutman (born 1974), British banker
- Anthony Guttig (born 1988), French ice hockey player
- Anthony Habgood (born 1946), British businessman
- Anthony Haden-Guest (born 1937), British writer and artist
- Anthony Hadingham (1913–1986), English cricketer
- Anthony R. Hale, American Army Lieutenant General
- Anthony Hall, several people
- Anthony Hallam (1933–2017), British geologist, paleontologist and writer
- Anthony P. Halsey, American banker
- A. P. Hamann (1909–1977), city manager of San Jose (1950–1969)
- Anthony Hamilton, several people
- Anthony Hamlet, former public official
- Anthony Hamlett (born 1973), American mixed martial arts fighter
- Anthony Hammer (born 1986), Australian actor
- Anthony Hammond, several people
- Anthony Hampden Dickson (1935–2022), Jamaican clergyman and bishop
- Anthony Hancock, several people
- Anthony Handrickan (born 1959), Australian cricketer
- Anthony Hankerson (born 2004), American football player
- Anthony Hanshaw (born 1978), American boxer
- Anthony Hanson, British Master of Wine and a senior consultant
- Anthony Hardy (1951–2020), English serial killer
- Anthony Harding, several people
- Anthony Hargrove (born 1983), American football player
- Anthony Harley (1963–2010), American musician
- Anthony Harnden, English academic
- Anthony Hart Harrigan (1925–2010), American journalist
- Anthony Stephen Harrington, American lawyer
- Anthony Harris, several people
- Anthony Harrison (born 1965), American football player
- Anthony Hart (c. 1754–1831, British lawyer
- Anthony Hartigan (born 2000), English footballer
- Anthony Hartley, British writer and critic
- Anthony Hartsook, American politician
- Anthony Harvey, multiple people
- Anthony Hashem, American filmmaker
- Anthony Haswell, multiple people
- Anthony Hathaway, American bank robber
- Anthony Havelock-Allan (1904–2003), British film producer and baronet
- Anthony Hawke (1895–1964), British judge
- Anthony Hawken, English sculptor
- Anthony Hawkins (1932–2013), Australian actor
- Anthony Hawkins-Kay (born 1990), Jersey cricketer
- Anthony Hawles (c. 1609–1664), English priest
- Anthony Hawtrey (1909–1954), British actor and theatre director
- Anthony Hayde (1932–2014), New Zealand field hockey player
- Anthony Hayes, several people
- Anthony Hayward, several people
- Anthony Head, several people
- Anthony Heald (born 1944), American actor
- Anthony C. Hearn, American computer scientist
- Anthony Heath (born 1942), British sociologist
- Anthony Hecht (1923–2004), American poet
- Anthony J. Hederman (1921–2014), Irish judge and barrister
- Anthony Hedges (1931–2019), English composer
- Anthony Hegarty (born 1987), Australian rugby union player
- Anthony Heidrich (born 1968), Australian cricketer
- Anthony Heilbut (born 1940), American biographer and record producer
- Anthony Heinrich (1781–1861), Czech conductor and composer
- Anthony Heinsbergen (1894–1981), American painter
- Anthony Hembrick (born 1966), American boxer
- Anthony Hemingway, American television and film director
- Anthony Jacob Henckel (1668–1728), German theologian
- Anthony Henday, English explorer
- Anthony Henderson, several people
- Anthony Henley, several people
- Anthony Henniker-Gotley (1887–1972), England international rugby union player
- Anthony Henry, several people
- Anthony Hensley (born 1953), American politician
- Anthony Henton (born 1963), American football player
- Anthony Herbert, several people
- Anthony Hernandez, several people
- Anthony Herrera (born 1980), American football player
- Anthony Herrera (1944–2011), American actor
- Anthony Herron (born 1979), American football player and commentator
- Anthony Heward (1918–1995), Royal Air Force Air Chief Marshal
- Anthony Hewitt (pianist), British musician
- Anthony Hewitt (born 1989), American baseball player
- Anthony Heygood (born 1986), American gridiron football player
- Anthony Hickey (born 1992), American basketball player
- Anthony Hickley (1906–1972), English director
- Anthony Hickox (1959–2023), English film director
- Anthony Hidden (1936–2016), English barrister and judge
- Anthony Higgins, several people
- Anthony Highmore (1758–1829), English legal writer
- Anthony Highmore (1719–1799), English draughtsman
- Anthony J. Hilder (1934–2019), American author, film maker, talk show host, broadcaster, news correspondent and former actor
- Anthony Hill, several people
- Anthony Hillary (1926–1991), English cricketer
- Anthony Hilliard (born 1986), American basketball player
- Anthony Hilton (born 1941), British mathematician
- Anthony Himbs (born 1960), American writer and movie director
- Anthony Hinds (1922–2013), English screenwriter and producer
- Anthony Ray Hinton (born 1956), American activist, writer and author
- Anthony Hitchens (born 1992), American football player
- Anthony Hlynka (1907–1957), Canadian politician
- Anthony TS Ho, British computer scientist
- Anthony Hobson (1921–2014), British book historian
- Anthony Hobson (born 1963), South African cricketer
- Anthony Hobson (English cricketer) (born 1965), English cricketer
- Anthony A. Hoekema (1913–1988), Dutch-American theologian
- Anthony Hoffman (1739–c. 1790), American politician
- Anthony Holborne (c. 1545–1602), British composer
- Anthony Holden (1947–2023), English writer, broadcaster and critici
- Anthony Holland, several people
- Anthony Holles, several people
- Anthony Holmes, British author and expert in the turnaround and business recovery field
- Anthony "A.J." Holmes Jr. (born 2003), American football player
- Anthony D. Holmes, Australian plastic and reconstructive surgeon
- Anthony Holten (1945–2020), Irish author
- Anthony Home (1826–1914), recipient of the Victoria Cross
- Anthony Hooper, several people
- Anthony Hope (1863–1933), English novelist
- Anthony Hopkins (born 1937), Welsh actor, director and producer
- Anthony Hopwood (1944–2010), British accounting academic
- Anthony Horgan (born 1976), Irish rugby union player
- Anthony Horneck (c. 1641–1697), German clergyman and scholar
- Anthony Horowitz (born 1955), English novelist and screenwriter
- Anthony Hossack (1867–1925), English footballer
- Anthony Housefather (born 1970), Canadian politician
- Anthony Howard, several people
- Anthony Howe, several people
- Anthony Howell, several people
- Anthony Howells (1832–1915), American politician
- Anthony Hrysanthos, Australian water polo player
- Anthony Hudson, several people
- Anthony Hughes, several people
- Anthony Huguet (born 1973), Australian alpine skier
- Anthony Hulme (1910–2007), British actor
- A. F. P. Hulsewé (1910–1993), Dutch Sinologist and scholar
- Anthony Humphreys (born 1971), Australian cricketer
- Anthony Hungerford, several people
- Anthony Hunt, several people
- Anthony Hunter, several people
- Anthony Hurd, Baron Hurd (1901–1966), British politician
- Anthony van den Hurk (born 1993), Curaçaoan footballer
- Anthony Hurrell (1927–2009), British diplomat
- Anthony Husbands (born 1956), Trinidad and Tobago sprinter
- Anthony Hussey, English merchant and lawyer
- Anthony Hutchison (born 1961), American football player
- Anthony Huxley (1920–1992), English botanist
- Anthony Hyde, Canadian author
- Anthony Hylton (born 1957), Jamaican politician
- Anthony Hyman, several people
- Anthony Iannaccone (born 1943), American composer and conductor
- Anthony Iapoce (born 1973), American professional football coach
- Anthony Idiata (born 1975), Nigerian high jumper
- Anthony R. Ierardi (born 1960), U. S. Army general
- Anthony Igwe (born 1945), Nigerian footballer
- Anthony Ikedi (born 1998), Nigerian footballer
- Anthony Ikhazoboh (died 1999), Nigerian general, politician and football executive
- Anthony Imperiale (1931–1999), American politician
- Anthony Impreveduto (1948–2009), American educator and Democratic Party politician
- Anthony Indelicato (born 1947), American mobster
- Anthony Ing, British-Canadian experimental filmmaker
- Anthony Ingerson (born 1969), Australian rules footballer
- Anthony Inglis, several people
- Anthony Ingram, several people
- Anthony Ingrassia (c. 1944–1995), American director, producer and playwright
- Anthony Ingruber (born 1990), Dutch-Australian actor and impressionist
- Anthony Irby, several people
- Anthony Ireland, several people
- Anthony Isaac, British composer
- Anthony W. Ishii (born 1946), American judge
- Anthony F. Ittner (1837–1931), American politician
- Anthony W. Ivins (1852–1934), American Mormon leader
- Anthony Jackson, several people
- Anthony Jacob (born 1989), Canadian rower
- Anthony Jacobi, American scientist and engineer
- Anthony Jacobs, Baron Jacobs (1931–2014), British businessman and politician
- Anthony James (1942–2020), American actor
- Anthony Janiec (1984–2022), French racing driver
- Anthony Janszoon van Salee, Dutch original settler of and prominent landholder, merchant, and creditor
- Anthony January (born 1993), American basketball player
- Anthony de Jasay (1925–2019), Hungarian economist and philosopher
- Anthony Jayakody, Sri Lankan RC bishop
- Anthony Jeanjean (born 1998), French cyclist
- Anthony Jeffrey (born 1994), English-born Guyanese footballer
- Anthony Jelonch (born 1996), French rugby union player
- Anthony Jenkins (born 1967), American basketball player
- Anthony Jenkinson (c. 1529–1611), English diplomat, travelled and explorer
- Anthony Jennings, several people
- Anthony Jeselnik (born 1978), American comedian, writer, actor, and producer
- Anthony Jessup (1928–1996), English cricketer
- Anthony Joe (born 1996), Australian badminton player
- Anthony Johnson, several people
- Anthony Johnstone (born 1973), American judge
- Anthony Jolliffe (born 1938), London Lord Mayor
- Anthony Jones, several people
- Anthony Jordan, multiple people
- Anthony Jorm (born 1951), Australian researcher
- Anthony Joseph (born 1966), Trinidad and Tobago writer, musician and academic
- Anthony Joshua (born 1989), British professional boxer
- Anthony Joyner, American serial killer
- Anthony Judge (born 1940), Australian encyclopedist
- Anthony Julian (1902–1984), American judge
- Anthony Michael Juliano (1922–2001), American thief
- Anthony Julius (born 1956), British solicitor advocate and academic
- Anthony Jullien (born 1998), French bicycle racer
- Anthony Jung (born 1991), German footballer
- Anthony Kaberry (born 1971), Australian rugby league player
- Anthony T. Kahoʻohanohano (1930–1951), American soldier
- Anthony Kaldellis (born 1971), American historian
- Anthony Kalik (born 1997), Australian association football player
- Anthony Kamanga, Malawian lawyer
- Anthony T. Kane, American lawyer
- Anthony Kang (born 1972), Korean-American professional golfer
- Anthony Kappes (born 1973, English cyclist
- Anthony Karbo (born 1979), Ghanaian politician
- Anthony Kasandwe (born 1969), Zambian politician
- Anthony Katagas (born 1971), American film producer
- Anthony Kavanagh (born 1969), Canadian stand-up comedian, actor, singer and TV presenter
- Anthony Kay (born 1995), American baseball player
- Anthony Keane (1928–2016), American fencer
- Anthony Kearns (born 1971), Irish singer
- Anthony Keck, several people
- Anthony Keith-Falconer, 7th Earl of Kintore (1794–1844), Scottish aristocrat
- Anthony Kellman (born 1955), American writer
- Anthony Kelly, several people
- Anthony Kemp, several people
- Anthony Kendall (born 1999), American football player
- Anthony Kennedy (born 1936), American lawyer and jurist
- Anthony Kennedy (1810–1892), American politician
- Anthony Kenny (born 1931), British philosopher
- Anthony Ker, New Zealand chess player
- Anthony Kern, American politician
- Anthony Kerr (born 1965), British jazz vibraphone player
- Anthony Kershaw (1915–2008), British politician
- Anthony Kershler (born 1968), Australian cricketer
- Anthony Kersting (1916–2008), British architectural photographer
- Anthony Ketchum (born 1962), American sprinter
- Anthony Nelson Keys (1911–1985), British film producer
- Anthony Keyvan (born 2000), American actor
- Anthony Khelifa (born 2005), French footballer
- Anthony Peter Khoraish (1907–1994), Head of the Maronite Church (1975–1986)
- Anthony Kiedis (born 1962), American musician, singer, songwriter and rapper
- Anthony Kilhoffer, American hip hop record producer, songwriter and engineer
- Anthony Killick (1829–1881), English cricketer
- Anthony Kim (born 1985), American professional golfer
- Anthony Kimani (born 1989), Kenyan footballer
- Anthony Kimble, American football player
- Anthony Kimmins (1901–1964), British film director
- Anthony King, several people
- Anthony Kingston (c. 1508–1556), English Royal official
- Anthony Kirkland (born 1968), American serial killer
- Anthony Kirwan (died 1868), Irish Anglican priest
- Anthony Kirwan (hurler), Irish hurler
- Anthony Kitchin (1477–1563), English abbot and bishop
- Anthony Kituuka, Ugandan accountant and corporate executive
- Anthony Kleanthous, British businessman
- Anthony Robert Klitz (1917–2000), English painter
- Anthony Knapp, multiple people
- Anthony Knight (born 1970), Jamaican hurdler
- Anthony Knockaert (born 1991), French association football player
- Anthony Knyvett, multiple people
- Anthony de Kock (born 1944), South African cricketer
- Anthony Kohlmann (1771–1836), Alsatian Catholic priest, missionary, theologian, and Jesuit educator
- Anthony Lee Kok Hin (born 1935), Malaysian Roman Catholic prelate
- Anthony L. Komaroff (born 1941), American physician
- Anthony Konyegwachie (born 1970), Nigerian boxer
- Anthony Korf (born 1951), American composer, artistic director and conductor
- Anthony Kosten (born 1958), English-French chess grandmaster and author
- Anthony Koura (born 1993), French association football player
- Anthony Koutoufides (born 1973), Australian footballer
- Anthony Kramreither (1926–1993), Austrian-Canadian actor and producer
- Anthony T. Kronman (born 1945), law professor at Yale Law School
- Anthony L. Krotiak (1915–1945), U. S. Army Medal of Honor recipient
- Anthony Kuhn, American radio journalist
- Anthony Kukwa (born 1992), American football player
- Anthony Kumpen (born 1978), Belgian racing driver
- Anthony Kurta (born 1959), American Navy admiral and government official
- Anthony Lacen (1950–2004), African-American jazz tuba player
- Anthony Laciura (born 1951), American actor and operatic tenor
- Anthony Ladd (born 1973), American football player
- Anthony Laden, American philosopher
- Anthony Laffor (born 1985), Liberian professional footballer
- Anthony Laffranchi (born 1980), Australia and Italy international rugby league footballer
- Anthony Lake (born 1974), West Indian cricketer
- Anthony Lake (born 1939), American academic and diplomat
- Anthony LaMarca, American musician
- Anthony Lamb, several people
- Anthony Lambert (1911–2007), British diplomat
- Anthony LaMolinara, American film director
- Anthony Landázuri (born 1997), Ecuadorian footballer
- Anthony Lane (born 1965), Australian tennis player
- Anthony Lane, British journalist and film critic
- Anthony Milner Lane (1928–2011), British theatrical nuclear physicist
- Anthony Langella (born 1974), French cyclist
- Anthony Langley (born 1954), British businessman
- Anthony Langston, English politician
- Anthony Lanier (born 1993), American gridiron football player
- Anthony Lant, English drummer
- Anthony LaPaglia (born 1959), Australian actor
- Anthony Lapham, environmentalist and lawyer
- Anthony Lapsley (born 1980), American mixed martial arts fighter
- Anthony Lapwood (born 1983), New Zealand writer
- Anthony LaRette, American executed serial killer
- Anthony Larkum (born 1940), British researcher
- Anthony Latina (born 1973), American basketball player and coach
- Anthony Seymour Laughton (1927–2019), British oceanographer
- Anthony Lawlor (born 1959), Irish former politician
- Anthony Lawrence, several people
- Anthony Layoun (born 1997), Lebanon international rugby league footballer
- Anthony Lazzaro, multiple people
- Anthony Le Gall (born 1985), French footballer
- Anthony Le Tallec (born 1984), French former professional footballer
- Anthony Leal (born 2001), American basketball player
- Anthony Leardi, Canadian politician
- Anthony Leban, Australian soccer player
- Anthony LeBlanc, Canadian sports executive
- Anthony Lechmere, multiple people
- Anthony Ledwith (1933–2015), British chemist
- Anthony Lee, several people
- Anthony Lefroy, several people
- Anthony Legendre (born 1996), American soccer player
- Anthony Legge (1939–2013), British archaeologist and academic
- Anthony James Leggett (1938–2026), British-American physicist
- Anthony Lehmann (born 1969), Australian comedian, actor, television and radio presenter
- Anthony Leiato (born 1965), American Samoan athlete
- Anthony Leigh (died 1692), English actor
- Anthony Lejeune (1928–2018), English writer, editor and broadcaster
- Anthony Lemke (born 1970), Canadian actor
- Anthony Leo, Canadian filmmaker and producer
- Anthony León (born 1997), American-born, Cuban and Colombian operatic tenor
- Anthony Leone, several people
- Anthony Lepore, American actor
- Anthony Ler (c. 1967–2002), Singaporean murderer
- Anthony Lerew (born 1982), American baseball player
- Anthony Lesiotis (born 2000), Australian soccer player
- Anthony A. Less (born 1937), United States Navy admiral
- Anthony Lester, Baron Lester of Herne Hill (1936–2020), British barrister and politician
- Anthony Levandowski, American artificial intelligence researcher
- Anthony Levatino (born 1956), American pro-life obstetrician
- Anthony Leviero (1905–1956), American journalist
- Anthony Levine (born 1987), American football player
- Anthony Lewis, several people
- Anthony Lexa, British actress
- Anthony Li Du'an, archbishop of Xi'an
- Anthony Li Hui, Chinese bishop
- Anthony Lima (born 1946), Gibraltarian politician
- Anthony Limbombe (born 1994), Belgian footballer
- Anthony Limbrick (born 1983), Australian football coach
- Anthony Lindsay, 30th Earl of Crawford, Scottish nobleman and clan chief
- Anthony Ling (1910–1987), Welsh cricketer
- Anthony Linick (born 1938), American educator and author
- Anthony William Linnane (1930–2017), Australian biochemist
- Anthony Lippini (born 1988), French footballer
- Anthony Lister (born 1979), Australian artist
- Anthony Little, several people
- Anthony Liu (born 1974), Chinese-American figure skater
- Anthony Liu (born 1987), American Samoan judoka
- Anthony Liveris, Australian businessperson
- Anthony Lledo (born 1972), Danish composer
- Anthony Llewellyn (1933–2013), American scientist and astronaut
- Anthony Lloyd (born 1984), English footballer
- Anthony Lobello Jr. (born 1984), short track speed skater
- Anthony Theodore Lobo (1937–2013), founder of SMCS
- Anthony Loffredo, French extreme body modification artist
- Anthony Loke (born 1977), Malaysian politician
- Anthony Lokosa (born 1997), Nigerian footballer
- Anthony Lolli, real estate developer, founder of Rapid Realty
- Anthony Long, several people
- Anthony Longdon, Grenadian boxer
- Anthony Lopes (born 1990), Portuguese footballer
- Anthony Losilla (born 1986), French professional footballer
- Anthony Loton (1904–1998), Australian politician
- Anthony Loubet, American attorney and politician
- Anthony Louis (born 1995), American ice hockey center
- Anthony Baruh Lousada, British solicitor, artist and administrator
- Anthony Lovrich (born 1961), Australian rower
- Anthony Peter Lowe (born 1962), Australian scientist
- Anthony Loyd (born 1966), English author and journalist
- Anthony Lozano (born 1993), Honduran footballer
- Anthony Lucas, several people
- Anthony Lucero, American film director
- Anthony Ludovici (1882–1971), British academic
- Anthony Lukeman (1933–2020), American military officer
- Anthony J. Lumsden (1928–2011), American architect
- Anthony Lun, Hong Kong songwriter and arranger
- Anthony Lupo (born 1966), American atmospheric scientist
- Anthony Lurling (born 1977), Dutch footballer
- Anthony Luteyn (1917–2003), Dutch army officer
- Anthony Luttrell (born 1932), British medieval historian
- Anthony Luvera, Australian artist, writer and educator
- Anthony Lyn, Welsh director and actor
- Anthony Lynch, several people
- Anthony Lynham (born 1960), Australian politician and an oral and maxillofacial surgeon
- Anthony Lynn (born 1968), American football coach and former running back
- Anthony Lyons (born 1957), South African cricketer
- Anthony Lyons (born 1967), British property investor
- Anthony MacGregor Grier (1911–1989), British colonial administrator, civil servant and soldier
- Anthony Macias (born 1969), American mixed martial arts fighter
- Anthony Mack, several people
- Anthony Mackie (born 1978), American actor
- Anthony Macris (born 1962), Australian novelist, critic and academic
- Anthony Maddox (born 1978), American gridiron football player
- Anthony Madison (born 1981), American football player
- Anthony Maestranzi (born 1984), American-Italian basketball player
- Anthony Maggiacomo (born 1984), American football player
- Anthony Maglica (born 1930), Croatian-American entrepreneur
- Anthony Magnacca (born 1978), Australian soccer player
- Anthony Maher, several people
- Anthony Mahoney, American baseball player
- Anthony Mahoungou (born 1994), French gridiron football player
- Anthony Mahowald, molecular genetics and cellular biologist
- Anthony Maisonnial (born 1998), French footballer
- Anthony Maitland, 10th Earl of Lauderdale (1785–1863), Royal Navy admiral and hereditary peer
- Anthony Maitland Stenhouse (1849–1927), Canadian politician
- Anthony Lino Makana, South Sudanese politician
- Anthony Malarczyk (born 1975), Welsh racing cyclist
- Anthony Malbon (born 1991), English footballer
- Anthony Malbrough (born 1976), American gridiron football player
- Anthony Maldonado, several people
- Anthony Malone (1700–1776), 18th-century Irish lawyer and politician
- Anthony Mamo (1909–2008), President of Malta (1974–1976)
- Anthony Manahan (1794–1849), Canadian politician
- Anthony Mancini, multiple people
- Anthony Mandile (1946–2002), American politician
- Anthony Mandler (born 1973), American film director, music video director, television commercial director and photographer
- Anthony Mandrea (born 1996), Algerian footballer
- Anthony Manfreda (1904–1988), American football player
- Anthony Mangano, American actor
- Anthony Mangnall (born 1989), British politician
- Anthony Mann (born 1951), retired British judge
- Anthony Mann (1906–1967), American film director and stage actor
- Anthony Manning (born 1992), American soccer player
- Anthony Mansard, French gymnast
- Anthony Manser, British philosopher
- Anthony Mantha (born 1994), Canadian ice hockey player
- Anthony Mantle, multiple people
- Anthony Manuel, American basketball player
- Anthony George Manzo, Nigerian politician
- Anthony Marais (born 1966), American writer, musician and academic
- Anthony Maras, Australian film director
- Anthony Marcel, British psychologist
- Anthony Marciona (born 1961), American actor
- Anthony Marinelli (born 1959), American musician, composer, synth programmer and conductor
- Anthony Marion (born 1994), France international rugby league footballer
- Anthony Markanich (born 1999), Filipino-American football player
- Anthony Marlowe, multiple people
- Anthony Maroon, Australian radio personality
- Anthony Marra (born 1984), American fiction writer
- Anthony Marreco (1915–2006), British lawyer
- Anthony Marriott (1931–2014), English actor and screenwriter
- Anthony Marrone, American fire chief
- Anthony J. Marsella (1940-2024), American author and academic
- Anthony S. Marsella (born 1947), American politician
- Anthony Marshall, several people
- Anthony Martella (born 2008), Canadian racing driver
- Anthony Martial (born 1995), French association football player
- Anthony J. Martin, American paleontologist
- Anthony Martinez, multiple people
- Anthony Martini, American music manager and executive
- Anthony Marwood (born 1965), English classical violinist
- Anthony Marx (born 1959), American academic
- Anthony Mascarenhas (1928–1986), Pakistani journalist and author
- Anthony Masiello (born 1947), American politician
- Anthony Mason, several people
- Anthony M. Massad (1928–2017), American lawyer and politician
- Anthony Massimino (born 1979), Italian baseball player
- Anthony Mastalir, U. S. Space Force officer
- Anthony Masters (1919–1990), British film production designer
- Anthony Masterson (born 1983), Irish Gaelic footballer
- Anthony Mastromauro (born 1968), American film producer
- Anthony Matengu (born 1977), Motswana footballer
- Anthony Mathenge (born 1978), Kenyan footballer
- Anthony Mathis (born 1996), American basketball player
- Anthony Mathison, Australian rugby union footballer
- Anthony Matumba, South African politician
- Anthony Mavunde (born 1984), Tanzanian politician
- Anthony May (1940–2024), British judge
- Anthony May (1946–2021), British actor
- Anthony Peter Mayalla, Tanzanian Catholic prelate
- Anthony Mayers (born 1937), Barbadian cricketer
- Anthony Mayney, English politician
- Anthony Mayweather (born 1985), American professional wrestler
- Anthony Avom Mbume (born 1968), Cameroonian wrestler
- Anthony McAuliffe (1898–1975), American general
- Anthony McCall (born 1946), British-born New York based artist
- Anthony McCann, American poet
- Anthony McCarten (born 1961), New Zealand writer
- Anthony M. McClone (1876–1938), American politician
- Anthony McCormack (born 1983), Australian television and radio producer
- Anthony McCowan (1928–2003), British judge
- Anthony McCoy (born 1987), American football player
- Anthony McCracken (born 1983), Australian boxer
- Anthony McCreath (born 1970), Jamaican footballer
- Anthony McCrossan (born 1969), British cycling commentator
- Anthony McDonald, multiple people
- Anthony McDowell (born 1968), American football player
- Anthony McFarland Jr. (born 1998), American football player
- Anthony McGill (born 1991), Scottish snooker player
- Anthony McGill (born 1979), American clarinetist
- Anthony McGowan (born 1965), English author
- Anthony McGrath (cricketer) (born 1975), English cricketer and coach
- Anthony McGregor (born 1972), Australian rules footballer
- Anthony McGurk, Derry Gaelic footballer
- Anthony McHenry (born 1983), American professional basketball player
- Anthony McIntyre (born 1957), IRA volunteer and writer
- Anthony McKenna (born 1969), English cricketer
- Anthony McKnight (1954–2019), American serial killer and rapist
- Anthony McLaughlin (1844–1925), Canadian politician
- Anthony McNamee (born 1984), British footballer
- Anthony McParland (born 1982), Scottish footballer
- Anthony McWhirter (1872–1932), Scottish footballer
- Anthony Mdluli, Swazi football manager
- Anthony Medel (born 1978), American beach volleyball player
- Anthony Meindl (born 1968), American actor
- Anthony Melchiorri (born 1965), American TV personality
- Anthony Melio (1932–2012), American politician
- Anthony Mellington (born 1974), Australian rules footballer
- Anthony Mello, American politician
- Anthony Mellows (1936–2016), English solicitor and British Army officer
- Anthony Mendes (1920–1964), Indian actor and comedian
- Anthony Mendleson (1915–1996), British costume and set designer
- Anthony Mensah (born 1972), Ghanaian footballer
- Anthony Merchant, Canadian politician
- Anthony J. Mercorella (1927–2022), American politician
- Anthony Merifield (1934–2024), British civil servant
- Anthony Merry (1756–1835), British diplomat
- Anthony Messere (born 1996), Canadian cyclist
- Anthony Methuen, multiple people
- Anthony Meyer, multiple people
- Anthony Mfa Mezui (born 1991), Gabonese footballer
- Anthony Michaels-Moore (born 1957), English operatic baritone
- Anthony Michalek (1878–1916), American politician
- Anthony N. Michel (1935–2020), American engineering educator
- Anthony Michell (1870–1959), Australian mechanical engineer
- Anthony Micklus, American politician
- Anthony Middleton (died 1590), English Roman Catholic priest and martyr
- Anthony Midget (born 1978), American football player and coach
- Anthony Mieres, English religious leader
- Anthony Miers (1906–1985), World War II Victoria Cross winner
- Anthony J. Mifsud, Maltese-born Canadian actor, singer and songwriter
- Anthony Mikovsky (born 1966), American Polish National Catholic bishop
- Anthony Milano (1888–1978), American mobster
- Anthony Mildmay (1549–1617), English diplomat
- Anthony Milford (born 1994), Australian rugby league footballer
- Anthony Millar (1934–1993), Irish Fianna Fáil politician
- Anthony Miller, several people
- Anthony Mills, several people
- Anthony Milner, several people
- Anthony Michael Milone (1932–2018), American Roman Catholic prelate
- Anthony Minghella (1954–2008), British film director, playwright and screenwriter
- Anthony Minichiello (born 1980), former Australian and Italian international rugby league footballer
- Anthony Miranda, American police officer
- Anthony Mirra (1927–1982), American mobster
- Anthony Misiewicz (born 1994), American baseball player
- Anthony Missenden, 16th century English politician
- Anthony Mitchell, several people
- Anthony Mithen, Australian sports journalist and horse breeder
- Anthony Mix (born 1983), American football player
- Anthony Modderman (1838–1885), Dutch politician
- Anthony Modeste, multiple people
- Anthony Moffat, Canadian politician
- Anthony Moise, Dominican politician
- Anthony Molina, multiple people
- Anthony Molloy, several people
- Anthony Mondell (1916–2009), American set decorator
- Anthony Monjaro, Nigerian actor and filmmaker
- Anthony Monn (born 1944), German musical artist
- Anthony R. Montalba (1813–1884), British painter
- Anthony Montero (born 1997), Venezuelan sports wrestler
- Anthony Montgomery (born 1984), American football player
- Anthony Montgomery (born 1971), American actor
- Anthony Moon, Guamanian footballer
- Anthony Kevin Morais (1960–2015), Malaysian prosecutor
- Anthony Mora, multiple people
- Anthony Morabito (born 1991), Australian rules footballer
- Anthony Morales (born 1990), American football player
- Anthony More, multiple people
- Anthony Morelli (born 1985), American football player
- Anthony Morgan, several people
- Anthony Morin (born 1974), French cyclist
- Anthony Moris (born 1990), Luxembourgish footballer
- Anthony Morley, British model and murderer
- Anthony Morris, several people
- Anthony Morrison (born 1984), American mixed martial arts fighter
- Anthony Morrow, British Royal Navy officer
- Anthony Morrow (born 1985), American basketball player
- Anthony Morse (1911–1984), American mathematician
- Anthony Mortas (born 1974), French ice hockey player
- A. Dirk Moses (born 1967), Australian historian
- Anthony Mosse (born 1964), New Zealand swimmer
- Anthony Mossi (born 1994), Congolese footballer
- Anthony Moulin (born 1986), French association football player
- Anthony Mounier (born 1987), French footballer
- Anthony Moura-Komenan (born 1986), Ivorian footballer
- Anthony Moyles (born 1976), Irish Gaelic footballer and manager
- Anthony Muheria (born 1963), Kenyan Roman Catholic prelate
- Anthony Muirhead (1890–1939), British Army officer and MP
- Anthony Ireri Mukobo, Kenyan Catholic prelate
- Anthony Muleta (born 1986), French rugby union player
- Anthony Muli, Kenyan citizen, Electrical Engineer, Loved by many
- Anthony Mullally (born 1991), Ireland international rugby league footballer
- Anthony Mullens (1936–2009), British Army Lieutenant General
- Anthony Mulvey (1882–1957), Irish nationalist politician
- Anthony Munday (c. 1560–1633), 16th/17th century English playwright
- A. J. Mundella (1825–1897), British politician
- Anthony Mundine (born 1975), Australian boxer, rugby league footballer and rapper
- Anthony Muñoz (born 1958), American football player
- Anthony Murley, English cricketer
- Anthony Murmu (1930–1985), Indian politician
- Anthony Murphy, several people
- Anthony Murray, several people
- Anthony Musaba (born 2000), Dutch footballer
- Anthony Musgrave (1828–1888), British colonial administrator
- Anthony Musgrave (1895–1959), Australian entomologist, librarian and photographer
- Anthony Musto (born 1968), American politician
- Anthony Muto, several people
- Anthony Myles, several people
- Anthony J. Naldrett (1933–2020), English-Canadian geologist
- Anthony Nanula (born 1965), American politician
- Anthony Naples, musical artist
- Anthony Napolitano (born 1975), American politician
- Anthony Napunyi (born 1982), Kenyan boxer
- Anthony Nares (1942–1996), British publisher
- Anthony Nash, multiple people
- Anthony Natale, Canadian-American actor
- Anthony Natsoulas, American sculptor
- Anthony Naveed, Pakistani politician
- Anthony Sean Neal, American philosophy professor
- Anthony Neely (born 1986), American-Taiwanese singer and actor
- Anthony Negus, British conductor
- Anthony Neilson, Scottish playwright and director
- Anthony Nesbit, English schoolmaster and land surveyor
- Anthony Nesty (born 1967), Surinamese swimmer
- Anthony Neuer, American bowling player
- Anthony New (1747–1833), American politician
- Anthony Newcomb (1941–2018), American musicologist
- Anthony Newlands (1925–1995), British actor
- Anthony Newley (1931–1999), British actor and musician
- Anthony Newman, multiple people
- Anthony Nguyen, American poker player
- Anthony Nicholl (1611–1658), English politician
- Anthony Nicholls, multiple people
- Anthony Nigro, American singer-songwriter
- Anthony Njokuani (born 1980), American mixed martial artist and kickboxer
- Anthony Nocella (born 1977), American racing driver
- Anthony Nolan, American politician and retired law enforcement officer
- Anthony Noreen, Canadian ice hockey player
- Anthony Noreiga (born 1982), Trinidad and Tobago footballer
- Anthony Norris, multiple people
- Anthony North, Australian judge
- Anthony Banning Norton (1821–1893), American politician
- Anthony Norton (born 1950), British bobsledder
- Anthony Nossiter, Australian sailor
- Anthony Noto (born 1968), American businessman
- Anthony Novak (born 1994), Canadian soccer player
- Anthony Nugent, several people
- Anthony Nunez (born 2001), American baseball player
- Anthony Nunn (1927–2025), British field hockey player
- Anthony Nuttall (1937–2007), English literary critic and academic
- Anthony Nutting (1920–1999), British diplomat and Conservative Party politician
- Anthony Nwakaeme (born 1989), Nigerian footballer
- Anthony Oakley (born 1981), American football player
- Anthony Obame (born 1988), Gabonese taekwondo practitioner
- Anthony Obi (1952–2022), Nigerian politician
- Anthony Obiagboso Enukeme (1944–2020), Nigerian businessman
- Anthony Obodai (born 1982), Ghanaian former professional footballer
- Anthony Ochaya (1932–1998), Ugandan politician
- Anthony Ochefu (died 1999), Nigerian Army officer
- Anthony Odunsi (born 1992), American-born Nigerian basketball player
- Anthony Oettinger (1929–2022), German-born American linguist and computer scientist
- Anthony d'Offay (born 1940), British art dealer, collector and curator
- Anthony Ogden (1866–1943), Australian politician
- Anthony Ogogo (born 1988), British boxer and professional wrestler
- Anthony Oguguo, Nigerian politician
- Anthony Ogus (1945–2026), professor
- Anthony Ojukwu, Nigerian lawyer and activist
- Anthony Olubunmi Okogie (born 1936), Catholic cardinal
- Anthony Okpotu (born 1994), Nigerian footballer
- Anthony Olascuaga, American boxer
- Anthony Oliphant (1793–c. 1859), Scottish lawyer
- Anthony Oliveira, Canadian author, journalist and pop culture critic
- Anthony Oliver (1922–1995), British actor
- Anthony Olusanya (born 2000), Finnish footballer
- Anthony Omenya, French-Canadian entrepreneur, investor and author
- Anthony Onah (born 1983), Nigerian-American film director, screenwriter, and producer
- Anthony Onwuegbuzie, American psychologist
- Anthony Onyearugbulem (1955–2002), Nigerian navy captain and politician
- Anthony J. Opachen (1909–1966), American politician and laborer
- Anthony Opal, American writer
- Anthony Oppenheimer (born 1937), British diamond dealer and racehorse owner
- Anthony Orange (born 1988), American football player
- Anthony Orchard (born 1946), Australian botanist
- Anthony Ormerod (born 1979), English footballer
- Anthony Ornato, former assistant director of the United States Secret Service Office of Training
- Anthony Ortega, multiple people
- Anthony Osarfo, Ghanaian journalist and screenwriter
- Anthony Oseyemi, British-South African actor
- Anthony Osorio (born 1994), Canadian professional soccer player
- Anthony Otter (1896–1986), Anglican bishop
- Anthony Ouasfane (born 1989), French footballer
- Anthony Overton (1865–1946), American businessman
- Anthony Owen, Australian economist and academic
- Anthony Oyono (born 2001), Gabonese footballer
- Anthony Padilla (born 1987), American actor, producer and YouTuber
- Anthony Paez (born 1984), American basketball player
- Anthony Pagden (born 1945), American political historian
- Anthony Page (c. 1563–1593), English Roman Catholic priest and martyr
- Anthony Page (1935–2026), British stage and film director
- Anthony Painter (born 1965), Australian professional golfer
- Anthony Palano (born 2005), American football player
- Anthony Palfreman (born 1946), English cricketer and cricket administrator
- Anthony Palliser (born 1949), British painter
- Anthony Palmer, several people
- Anthony Palou (born 1965), French writer
- Anthony Palumbo (born 1970), American politician
- Anthony Panizzi (1797–1879), Italian-British librarian
- Anthony Pannier (born 1988), French swimmer
- Anthony Pappa (born 1973), Australian DJ and music producer
- Anthony Parel (1926–2025), Canadian historian, author and academic
- Anthony Parker, multiple people
- Anthony Parkhurst, English explorer and promoter of English colonization of North America
- Anthony Parkinson, English Franciscan friar and historian
- Anthony Parnther (born 1981), American conductor and bassoonist
- Anthony Partipilo (born 1994), Italian footballer
- Anthony Pateras, Australian musician and composer
- Anthony Patrick, Indian footballer
- Anthony Patterson (born 2000), English professional footballer
- Anthony Patti (born 2002), Brazilian footballer
- Anthony Paule, musical artist
- Anthony Pavlešić (born 2006), Australian soccer player
- Anthony Payne (1936–2021), English composer, music critic and musicologist
- Anthony Peacock (born 1985), English footballer
- Anthony Peacocke, British police officer
- Anthony Pearson, several people
- Anthony Peck (1947–1996), American actor
- Anthony Peckham, South African-born American screenwriter and producer
- Anthony Peddle (born 1971), British Paralympic Powerlifter
- Anthony Peden (born 1970), New Zealand cyclist
- Anthony Pedroza (born 1979), Mexican-American basketball player
- Anthony Peeler (born 1969), American basketball player
- Anthony Leopold Raymond Peiris (1932–2017), Sri Lankan Roman Catholic bishop
- Anthony Pelham (1911–1969), English cricketer
- Anthony Pelissier (1912–1988), British actor, screenwriter, producer and director
- Anthony Pelle (born 1972), American basketball player
- Anthony Pellicano (born 1944), American private investigator and criminal
- Anthony Dominic Pellicer (1824–1880), American prelate
- Anthony Peluso (born 1989), Canadian ice hockey player
- Anthony Pena (born 1947), American actor
- Anthony Peratt, American physicist
- Anthony Pereira (born 1982), Indian footballer
- Anthony Perenise (born 1982), New Zealand rugby union player
- Anthony C. Perera (1921–1988), Sri Lankan actor, screenplay writer and comedian
- Anthony Perez, several people
- Anthony Perish (born 1969), Australian murderer
- Anthony Perkins, multiple people
- Anthony Perosh (born 1972), American mixed martial arts fighter
- Anthony J. Perpich (1932–2017), American dentist and politician
- Anthony Perrot (born 1974), French rower
- Anthony Perruzza, Canadian politician
- Anthony Perry, Irish guerilla
- Anthony Pesela, Botswana sprinter
- Anthony Peters (born 1983), American soccer player
- Anthony Peters, Canadian ice hockey player
- Anthony Peters, American race-walker
- Anthony Peterson (born 1985), American boxer
- Anthony Petrie (born 1983), Australian basketball player
- Anthony Petrosky, American poet and professor
- Anthony Petruccelli (born 1972), American politician
- Anthony Petrushevych (1821–1913), Ukrainian church historian and Greek Catholic priest
- Anthony Pettis (born 1987), American mixed martial artist
- Anthony Phelps (1928–2025), Haitian-Canadian writer
- Anthony Phillips, multiple people
- Anthony Picciano (born 1947), American scholar, writer and academic
- Anthony Piccione (1939–2001), American writer
- Anthony Pierce (born 1941), West Anglican bishop
- Anthony Pigott (1944–2020), British Army general
- Anthony Pilkington (born 1988), Irish footballer
- Anthony Pilla (1932–2021), American Roman Catholic prelate
- Anthony Pini (1902–1989), Argentinian-born cellist
- Anthony Pinthus (born 1998), Filipino footballer
- Anthony Pinto (born 2006), Hong Kong footballer
- Anthony Pittman (born 1996), American football player
- Anthony Pleasant (born 1989), American football player and coach
- Anthony Pleeth, English cellist
- Anthony Plog (born 1947), American conductor
- Anthony Plowman (1905–1993), British barrister and judge
- Anthony Poggo, South Sudanese Anglican bishop
- Anthony Poindexter (born 1976), American football player and coach
- Anthony van den Pol (1949–2020), American neurosurgeon
- Anthony Polite (born 1997), Swiss basketball player
- Anthony Pollard, multiple people
- Anthony Pollina (born 1952), American politician
- Anthony Pollock (born 1973), South African cricketer
- Anthony Ponomarenko (born 2001), American figure skater
- Anthony Poola (born 1961), Indian Latin Catholic bishop
- Anthony Pople (1955–2003), British musicologist
- Anthony Portantino (born 1961), American politician
- Anthony Porter, American wrongfully exonerated of murderer
- Anthony Portier (born 1982), Belgian footballer
- Anthony Poshepny (1924–2003), American CIA paramilitary officer
- Anthony Potts (1963/1964–2023), U. S. Army general
- Anthony Powell, several people
- Anthony Power (1945–2023), British fencer
- Anthony Powers (born 1953), British composer
- Anthony Poyntz, English diplomat
- Anthony Pratkanis (born 1957), American psychologist
- Anthony Pratt, multiple people
- Anthony Precourt, American investor
- Anthony Preston, several people
- Anthony Previté, Irish Anglican clergyman
- Anthony Price, several people
- Anthony Principi (born 1944), 4th U. S. Secretary of Veterans Affairs
- Anthony Prior (born 1970), American gridiron football player
- Anthony Pritzker (born 1961), American businessman and philanthropist
- Anthony Winza Probowo, Indonesian lawyer and politician
- Anthony Procter (1943–2020), South African cricketer
- Anthony Prospect (1928–c. 2000), Trinidad and Tobago conductor
- Anthony Provenzano (1917–1988), American mobster
- Anthony Prusinski (1901–1950), American politician
- Anthony Prymack (born 1990), Canadian fencer
- Anthony Pryor, American role-playing game designer
- Anthony Pudewell (born 1983), American football player
- Anthony Pulis (born 1984), Welsh football coach and former player
- Anthony Pullard (born 1966), American basketball player
- Anthony Pun, Hong Kong film director and cinematographer
- Anthony Purpura (born 1986), American rugby union player
- Anthony Purssell (born 1926), English businessman and rower
- Anthony Pym, Australian translator
- Anthony C. E. Quainton (1934–2023), American diplomat
- Anthony Quartuccio, American music director and conductor
- Anthony Quayle (born 1994), Australian professional golfer
- Anthony Quayle (1913–1989), British actor, theater director and novelist
- Anthony Quiney, British architectural historian, building archaeologist, writer and photographer
- Anthony Quinlan (born 1984), English actor
- Anthony Quinton, multiple people
- Anthony Quintal, American former YouTuber known online as Lohanthony
- Anthony Quinton (1925–2010), British political and moral philosopher, metaphysician, and materialist philosopher of mind
- Anthony Quinton Keasbey (1824–1895), American lawyer
- Anthony Racioppi (born 1998), Swiss footballer
- Anthony Radetic (born 1979), American paraplegic athlete
- Anthony Radziwiłł (1959–1999), Swiss-born American television executive and filmmaker
- Anthony Rainbow, Irish Gaelic footballer and manager
- Anthony Ralston (born 1998), Scottish footballer
- Anthony Ramos, several people
- Anthony Ranaudo (born 1989), American baseball player
- Anthony Randazzo (born 1966), Australian bishop
- Anthony Randolph (born 1989), German-born American and naturalized Slovenian former professional basketball player
- Anthony Raneri (born 1982), American singer, guitarist and songwriter
- Anthony McGuin Rankin (1873–1927), Canadian politician
- Anthony Rapp (born 1971), American actor and singer
- Anthony Gerhard Alexander van Rappard (1799–1869), Dutch politician
- Anthony Rasch (c. 1778–1858), German-American silversmith
- Anthony Rawlins, Australian army officer
- Anthony Ray, multiple people
- Anthony Raymond, American architect
- Anthony Rayson, American anarchist activist and author
- Anthony Pascal Rebello (1950–2024), Kenyan Roman Catholic prelate
- Anthony Read (1935–2015), English television producer, screenwriter, script editor and author
- Anthony Reategui, American poker player
- Anthony Rech (born 1992), French ice hockey player
- Anthony Reckenzaun (1850–1893), Austrian electrical engineer
- Anthony Recker (born 1983), American broadcaster and former professional baseball catcher and first baseman
- Anthony Reddick (born 1985), American football player
- Anthony G. Reddie, British-Caribbean academic and theologian
- Anthony Redmon (born 1971), American football player
- Anthony Reed (born 1971), American basketball player
- Anthony Reeve (1938–2014), British diplomat and ambassador
- Anthony Reeves, South African politician
- Anthony Reid (1939–2025), Australian academic
- Anthony Reid (born 1957), British race car driver
- Anthony Rendon (born 1990), American baseball player
- Anthony Rendon (born 1968), American politician
- Anthony J. Resta, Canadian record producer and musician
- Anthony Réveillère (born 1979), French footballer
- Anthony Revell (1935–2018), British Royal Army medical officer
- Anthony B. Rewald (1906–1993), American electrical engineer and politician
- Anthony Reyes (born 1981), American baseball player
- Anthony Reynolds, Welsh musician
- Anthony Rhodes (1916–2004), British writer
- Anthony Ribelin (born 1996), French footballer
- Anthony Ribustello (died 2019), American actor and politician
- Anthony Richard (born 1996), Canadian ice hockey player
- Anthony Richards, several people
- Anthony Richardson, several people
- Anthony B. Richmond (born 1942), British cinematographer
- Anthony Ricketts (born 1979), Australian squash player
- Anthony Riddington (1911–1998), English cricketer
- Anthony Rimell (1928–2007), English cricketer
- Anthony Rimington, Royal Navy officer
- Anthony Ríos (1950–2019), Dominican singer, actor and comedian
- Anthony Ritchie, New Zealand composer
- Anthony Elliot Ritchie, Scottish physiologist and educator
- Anthony Rix (born 1956), Royal Navy Rear Admiral
- Anthony Rizzo (born 1989), American baseball player
- Anthony Roane, 16th century English politician
- Anthony Robbins, occupational health and safety expert
- Anthony Roberson (born 1983), American basketball player
- Anthony Roberts, several people
- Anthony Robinson, multiple people
- Anthony Robles (born 1988), American wrestler
- Anthony Rocca (born 1977), Australian rules footballer
- Anthony Roche (born 1976), Australian soccer player
- Anthony J. Rock, U. S. Air Force general
- Anthony Rock (born 1970), Australian rules footballer
- Anthony Roczen (born 1999), German footballer
- Anthony Morgan Rodman, American political figure
- Anthony Rodriguez, multiple people
- Anthony Rogers, several people
- Anthony Rogie (born 1991), French footballer
- Anthony Rohrs (1961–1988), New Zealand cricketer
- Anthony Roland, British producer of films
- Anthony Rollett, British materials scientist and engineer
- Anthony Romaniw (born 1991), Canadian middle distance runner
- Anthony D. Romero (born 1965), American activist
- Anthony Roncaglia (born 2000), French footballer
- Anthony Roncoroni, rugby union player
- Anthony Rooley (born 1944), British lutenist
- Anthony Rosaldo (born 1994), Filipino singer, actor, host and model
- Anthony Red Rose (born 1962), Jamaican musical artist
- Anthony Rose, multiple people
- Anthony Ross (1909–1955), American character actor
- Anthony Ross (born 1976), American tennis player
- Anthony Priest (1917–1993), Scottish Catholic priest
- Anthony T. Rossi (1900–1993), founder of Tropicana Products
- Anthony Rossiter, British painter
- Anthony Rossomando (born 1976), American guitarist
- Anthony Rota (born 1961), Canadian politician
- Anthony Gustav de Rothschild (1887–1961), British banker
- Anthony James de Rothschild (born 1977), British businessman
- Anthony Rotich (born 1991), Kenyan-born American long-distance runner
- Anthony Rotondo (born 1957), American mobster
- Anthony Rouault (born 2001), French footballer
- Anthony Rous (died 1620), English politician
- Anthony Rous (c. 1605–1677), English politician
- Anthony Roux (born 1987), French road bicycle racer
- Anthony Rowe, multiple people
- Anthony Rowse, first colonial Governor of Suriname
- Anthony Royle, Baron Fanshawe of Richmond (1927–2001), British conservative politician and businessman
- Anthony Rubino (1921–1983), American football player
- Anthony Rubio, American fashion designer
- Anthony M. Rud (1893–1942), American novelist
- Anthony Rudd (died 1615), British bishop
- Anthony Ruivivar (born 1970), American actor
- Anthony Rush (born 1996), American football defensive tackle
- Anthony Rushton (born 1971), British tech entrepreneur
- Anthony Russell, multiple people
- Anthony Russo, several people
- Anthony Ryan, multiple people
- Anthony Ryle (1927–2016), English medical doctor
- Anthony Sabatini (born 1988), American attorney and politician
- Anthony Sabatino (1944–1993), American art director
- Anthony Sabuneti (born 1974), Zimbabwean sculptor
- Anthony Sadin (born 1989), Belgian footballer
- Anthony Sadler (born 1992), American author
- Anthony Sagar (1920–1973), English actor
- A. J. Sager (born 1965), American baseball player and coach
- Anthony Sagnella (born 1964), American football player
- Anthony Saidy (born 1937), American chess master, physician and author
- Anthony Salerno (1911–1992), American mobster
- Anthony Saliba, American conservative and businessperson
- Anthony Salim (born 1949), Indonesian businessman and investor
- Anthony Salis (born 1988), French footballer
- Anthony Salisbury, U. S. Government official
- Anthony Salvin (1799–1881), English architect
- Anthony Salz (born 1950), British solicitor
- Anthony D. Salzman, American businessman
- Anthony Sammy, Trinidad and Tobago politician
- Anthony Sampson (1926–2004), British writer and journalist
- Anthony Samuel, Cook Island rugby league footballer
- Anthony Ichiro Sanda (born 1944), Japanese—American physicist
- Anthony Sanders (born 1974), American baseball player and coach
- Anthony Sands (1806–1883), British painter
- Anthony Santander (born 1994), Venezuelan baseball player
- Anthony Santasiere (1904–1977), American chess player
- Anthony Santo, Italian-American serial killer
- Anthony Santos (born 1992), Dominican footballer
- Anthony Sattilaro (1931–1989), American politician
- Anthony Saunders, multiple people
- Anthony Sauthier (born 1991), Swiss footballer
- Anthony Savage (1893–1970), American athlete and coach
- Anthony P. Savarese Jr. (1917–2002), American politician
- Anthony Sawoniuk (1921–2005), Belarusian Nazi collaborator
- Anthony Sawyer (born 1980), British skeleton racer
- Anthony Saxton (1934–2015), British businessman
- Anthony D. Sayre (1858–1931), American politician
- Anthony Scaduto (1932–2017), American journalist and biographer
- Anthony Scaramozzino (born 1985), French professional football defender
- Anthony Scaramucci (born 1964), American financier and political figure
- Anthony Scardino (born 1936), American politician
- Anthony Scariano (1918–2004), American politician
- Anthony Louis Scarmolin (1890–1969), American composer
- Anthony Scattergood (1611–1687), English clergyman and scholar
- Anthony Scharba, Eastern Orthodox bishop
- Anthony Schlegel (born 1981), American football player and coach
- Anthony Schmid (born 1999), Austrian association footballer
- Anthony Schneider (1933–1997), Canadian ice hockey player
- Anthony Robin Schneider, Austrian operatic bass
- Anthony Joseph Schuler (1869–1944), American prelate
- Anthony Schuster (born 1990), French footballer
- Anthony Schuyler Arrott (1928–2024), Canadian physicist
- Anthony Schwartz (born 2000), American sprinter and football player
- Anthony M. Scibelli (1911–1998), American politician
- Anthony Joseph Scirica (born 1940), American judge
- Anthony Scirrotto (born 1986), American football player
- Anthony Sclafani (born 1944), American neuroscientist
- A. O. Scott (born 1966), American journalist and film critic
- Anthony Scotto (1934–2021), American mobster
- Anthony Scribe (born 1988), French footballer
- Anthony Scully (born 1999), Irish professional footballer
- Anthony Sedlak (1938–2012), Canadian chef
- Anthony Seibold (born 1974), Australian rugby league footballer and coach
- Anthony Seigler (born 1999), American baseball player
- Anthony Seldon (born 1953), British educator and historian
- Anthony Hugh Selormey (born 1937), Ghanaian soldier and politician
- Anthony Selway (1909–1984), Royal Air Force Air Marshal
- Anthony Semerad (born 1991), Filipino basketball player
- Anthony S. Seminerio (1935–2011), American politician
- Anthony Semrani, Australian rugby league footballer
- Anthony Senecal (1941–2020), American politician and butler
- Anthony Seratelli (born 1983), American baseball player
- Anthony Sergi, American racing driver
- Anthony Šerić (born 1979), Croatian-Australian footballer
- Anthony Serka (born 1944), Canadian lawyer
- Anthony Sesely, American racing driver
- Anthony Seuseu (born 1979), New Zealand rugby league footballer
- Anthony Severin, Saint Lucian diplomat
- Anthony Sevryuk (born 1984), Russian bishop
- Anthony Sewell (1962–2009), American bicycle motocross rider
- Anthony Shacklady (1945–2014), British wrestler
- Anthony Shadid (1968–2012), American journalist
- Anthony Shaffer, multiple people
- Anthony Shakir, American techno musician
- Anthony Shandran (born 1981), English footballer
- Anthony Francis Sharma (1937–2015), First Catholic bishop of Nepal
- Anthony Sharp (1915–1984), British actor
- Anthony Sharp (1643–1707), Irish businessman
- Anthony Sharpe (born 1974), Australian actor, producer and singer
- Anthony Shavies (born 1983), American basketball player
- Anthony Shaw, several people
- Anthony B. Shelby (1789–1851), American judge
- Anthony Shelton (born 1967), American gridiron football player
- Anthony Sherman (born 1988), American football player
- Anthony Sherwood, Canadian actor
- Anthony Shetler (born 1982), American skateboarder
- Anthony Shillinglaw (born 1937), English cricketer
- Anthony Shim, Canadian actor and filmmaker
- Anthony Shimaga, Nigerian footballer
- Anthony Shirley (1565–1635), English soldier and traveler
- Anthony Allen Shore (1962–2018), American serial killer and child molester
- Anthony Shorris (born 1957), former Deputy Mayor of New York City
- Anthony Shorrocks (born 1946), British development economist
- Anthony Short (born 1953), New Zealand cricketer
- Anthony Shorten (born 1969), Australian politician
- Anthony Johnson Showalter (1858–1924), American composer
- Anthony Shriver (born 1965), American activist
- Anthony T. Shtogren (1917–2003), U. S. Air Force general
- Anthony Shumaker (born 1973), American baseball player
- Anthony Shutt (born 1987), American football player
- Anthony Siaguru, Papua New Guinea public servant and anti-corruption campaigner
- Anthony Sichi (born 1986), French football manager
- Anthony E. Siegman (1931–2011), American electrical engineer and educator
- Anthony Simcoe (born 1969), Australian actor
- Anthony Simmons, multiple people
- Anthony Simonds-Gooding (1937–2017), Irish marketing manager and chief executive
- Anthony Simonsen (born 1997), American ten-pin bowler
- Anthony Simpson (1935–2022), British politician
- Anthony Sims Jr. (born 1995), American boxer
- Anthony Sinagra, American politician
- Anthony Martin Sinatra (1892–1969), Sicilian-American Hoboken city fireman, professional boxer, and bar owner; father of Frank Sinatra
- Anthony Sinclair (born 1966), Australian rules footballer
- Anthony Sinisuka Ginting, Indonesian badminton player
- Anthony Skingsley (1933–2019), Royal Air Force Air Chief Marshal
- Anthony Skordi, British-American actor
- Anthony Skorich (born 1990), Australian soccer player
- Anthony Skoronski (1920–1992), American jockey
- Anthony Slama (born 1984), American baseball player
- Anthony Slaughter (born 1962), British politician
- A. J. Slaughter (born 1967), American-born Polish professional basketball player
- Anthony Sloman (born 1945), English film producer and screenwriter
- Anthony Small (born 1981), English boxer
- Anthony Smart, Trinidadian politician
- Anthony Smee (born 1949), British theatre producer and actor
- Anthony Smellie, chief judge of the Cayman Islands
- Anthony Smith, several people
- Anthony Snaer, American sugar grower and politician
- Anthony Snobeck (born 1983), French professional golfer
- Anthony Snodgrass (born 1934), British classical archaeologist
- A. J. Soares (born 1988), American soccer player
- Anthony Solometo (born 2002), American baseball player
- Anthony Solomon, several people
- Anthony Soren (born 1988), Indian footballer
- Anthony Sorenson (born 2003), American soccer player
- Anthony Sosa (born 1996), Uruguayan soccer player
- Anthony Soubervie (born 1984), French Guinean footballer
- Anthony Sowell (1959–2021), American serial killer and rapist
- Anthony Spanos (born 1995), Australian actor
- Anthony Sparks, American television show runner, writer-producer and playwright
- Anthony Sparrow (1612–1685), British bishop, academic and theologian
- Anthony Spaulding (1933–1998), Jamaican politician
- Anthony Spencer, several people
- Anthony Spero (1929–2008), American mobster
- Anthony Spillane (born 1960), Australian cricketer
- Anthony Spilotro (1938–1986), American mobster
- Anthony Spinelli, American film producer
- Anthony Squire (1914–2000), English screenwriter
- Anthony St Ledger (1859–1929), English-born Australian politician
- Anthony St Leger, multiple people
- Anthony Stacchi (born 1964), American effects animator, storyboard artist, screenwriter and film director
- Anthony Stacey (born 1977), American basketball player and head coach
- Anthony Stack (born 1961), Canadian Army general
- Anthony Stainton (1913–1988), British lawyer and parliamentary draftsman
- Anthony Standen, English spy
- Anthony Stanford (1830–1883), African-American politician
- Anthony Stansfeld (born 1945), British politician and Police and Crime Commissioner
- Anthony Stanyard (born 1938), English cricketer
- Anthony Stapleton, 16th century English politician and lawyer
- Anthony Stapley (1590–1655), English politician and regicide
- Anthony Stark (1961–2011), American film director and screenwriter
- Anthony Starke (born 1963), American actor
- Anthony Starks (1873–1952), England international dual-code rugby footballer
- Anthony Steel, multiple people
- Anthony Steels (1959–2017), American football player
- Anthony Steen (born 1939), British politician and barrister
- Anthony Steen (born 1990), American football player
- Anthony Steffen (1930–2004), Italian-Brazilian character actor, screenwriter and film producer
- Anthony Steinbock, American philosopher and professor
- Anthony J. Stella (1928–1978), American politician
- Anthony Stephens (born 1987), British Paralympic swimmer
- Anthony Coningham Sterling (1805–1871), British Army officer/historian
- Anthony Stern (1944–2022), British documentary filmmaker
- Anthony Steven (1916–1990), British television scriptwriter
- Anthony Stevens, several people
- Anthony Stewart, several people
- Anthony Stirrat (born 1970), British cyclist
- Anthony Stocking, British rower
- Anthony Stokes (born 1998), Guernsey cricketer
- Anthony Stokes (born 1988), Irish association football player
- Anthony Stolarz (born 1994), American ice hockey player
- Anthony Stone, British academic
- Anthony Morris Storer (1746–1799), British politician and diplomat
- Anthony Storr (1920–2001), English psychiatrist, psychoanalyst and author
- Anthony Stovall (born 1982), American soccer player
- Anthony Stover (born 1990), American basketball player
- Anthony Straker (born 1988), English-Grenadian footballer
- Anthony Stransham (1805–1900), British general
- Anthony Strong (born 1984), British musician
- Anthony Stuart, multiple people
- Anthony Stumpf, American publisher
- Anthony R. Suarez (born 1967), American lawyer
- Anthony Sullivan, multiple people
- Anthony Sully (1944–2023), American serial killer
- Anthony Summers (born 1942), Irish author and journalist
- Anthony Sumption (1919–2008), British submarine commander
- Anthony Suntay, Filipino sportscaster
- Anthony Suter, American composer and music educator
- Anthony Sutton, multiple people
- Anthony Swamy Thomasappa (born 1951), Roman Catholic bishop
- Anthony Swann (born 1975), New Zealand and Samoa international rugby league footballer
- Anthony Swarzak (born 1985), American baseball player
- Anthony Sweeney (born 1938), British judoka
- Anthony Sweijs (1852–1937), Dutch sports shooter
- Anthony Swete, American singer
- Anthony Swofford (born 1970), American writer and former U. S. Marine
- Anthony Swolfs (born 1997), Belgian footballer
- Anthony Langley Swymmer (c. 1724–1760), English MP
- Anthony Sydes (1941–2015), American actor
- Anthony Syhre (born 1995), German footballer
- Anthony Sykes (born 1972), American politician
- Anthony Taberna (born 1975), Filipino broadcast journalist, radio commentator and businessman
- Anthony Tahana, New Zealand international rugby union footballer
- Anthony Tailboyes, 16th century English politician
- Anthony Tait, American informer
- Anthony Talo (born 1996), Solomon Islands footballer and futsal player
- Anthony Julian Tamburri (born 1948), American academic
- Anthony Tan, Malaysian-born Singaporean businessman
- Anthony Jackie Tang (born 1998), Hong Kong tennis player
- Anthony Tapia (born 1987), Colombian footballer
- Anthony Tarke, American basketball player
- Anthony Tata (born 1959), American retired United States Army officer, author, and government official
- Anthony Taugourdeau (born 1989), French footballer
- Anthony F. Tauriello (1899–1983), American politician
- Anthony Taylor, several people
- Anthony Te Paske, American politician and businessman
- Anthony Teachey (born 1962), American basketball player
- Anthony 'Scooter' Teague (1940–1989), American actor and dancer
- Anthony Telford (born 1966), American baseball player
- Anthony Terlato (1934–2020), American wine expert
- Anthony Terras (born 1985), French sport shooter
- Anthony Tew (1908–1987), English cricketer and solicitor
- Anthony Thackara (1917–2007), English cricketer and Royal Navy officer
- Anthony Thackeray (born 1986), English rugby league footballer
- Anthony Therrien, Canadian actor
- Anthony Thieme (1888–1954), American painter
- Anthony Thiselton (1937–2023), British theologian and priest
- Anthony Thistlethwaite (born 1955), British multi-instrumentalist
- Anthony Thomas, multiple people
- Anthony Thompson, multiple people
- Anthony Thomson, several people
- Anthony Thornton, multiple people
- Anthony Thorold (c. 1520–1594), English politician
- Anthony Throckmorton, 16th century English politician
- Anthony Tidd, African American musician
- Anthony Tognazzini, American short story writer
- Anthony Tohill (born 1971), Gaelic footballer
- Anthony Tokpah (born 1948), retired Liberian football goalkeeper
- Anthony Tolliver (born 1985), American basketball player
- Anthony Tomlinson, English boxer
- Anthony Tommasini (born 1948), American music journalist and author
- Anthony Toney (born 1962), American football player
- Anthony Tonkin (born 1980), English footballer
- Anthony F. Tonnos (born 1935), Canadian prelate
- Anthony Toribio (born 1985), American football player
- Anthony Torrone (born 1955), American Christian author
- Anthony Toto (1498–1554), Italian painter
- Anthony Totten (born 1969), Australian rugby league footballer
- Anthony Trafford, Baron Trafford (1932–1989), British Conservative Party politician and physician
- Anthony Traill, multiple people
- Anthony Tratt (born 1965), Australian professional racing car driver
- Anthony J. Travia (1911–1993), American judge
- Anthony Treadwell (1922–2003), New Zealand architect
- Anthony Trenga (born 1949), American judge
- Anthony Trethowan (1945–2015), Australian politician
- Anthony Triano (1928–1997), American painter, sculptor, illustrator and teacher
- Anthony Trickett (c. 1940–2013), Scottish doctor
- Anthony Trimingham, English public health activist
- Anthony Trollope (1815–1882), English novelist and civil servant
- Anthony Joseph Tromba (born 1943), American mathematician
- Anthony Troup (1921–2008), Royal Navy Vice-Admiral
- Anthony Francis Troy, 32nd Attorney General of Virginia
- Anthony Tuck, British historian
- Anthony Tucker, multiple people
- Anthony Tuckney (1599–1670), English theologian
- Anthony Tuggle (born 1963), American football player
- Anthony Tuitavake (born 1982), New Zealand rugby union player
- Anthony Tuke (1897–1975), English banker
- Anthony Tuke (1920–2001), English banker
- Anthony Tupou (born 1983), Australia and Tonga international rugby league footballer
- Anthony Turgis (born 1994), French cyclist
- Anthony Turner, multiple people
- Anthony Turpel, American actor
- Anthony Tyrrell, Roman Catholic priest and Church of England clergyman
- Anthony Tyus III (born 2003), American football player
- Anthony Ubach (1835–1907), Roman Catholic priest and advocate for the education of Native Americans in San Diego, California
- Anthony Udofia, Nigerian military governor
- Anthony Ughtred (c. 1478–1534), English soldier and military administrator
- Anthony Ujah (born 1990), Nigerian football player
- Anthony Ukpo (1947–2021), Nigerian governor
- Anthony Ulasewicz (1918–1997), American investigator
- Anthony Ulonnam, Nigerian Paralympic weightlifter
- Anthony Ulrich, multiple people
- Anthony Ulwick, American businessman
- Anthony Umanzor (born 2008), Canadian soccer player
- Anthony Unger, multiple people
- Anthony Upton, multiple people
- Anthony Uribe (born 1990), Venezuelan association football player
- Anthony Uzodimma (born 1999), Nigerian football player
- Anthony Vaccarello (born 1982), Belgian-Italian fashion designer
- Anthony Vadkovsky, Russian Orthodox bishop
- Anthony P. Vainieri (1928–2026), American politician
- Anthony Valencia (born 2003), Ecuadorian footballer
- Anthony Valentine (1939–2015), English actor
- Anthony Valletta (1908–1988), Maltese naturalist
- Anthony Van Bergen (c. 1786–1859), American politician
- Anthony Van Curen (born 1990), American football coach
- Anthony van Diemen (1593–1645), Dutch colonial governor
- Anthony Van Dyck (horse), Irish-bred thoroughbred racehorse
- Anthony van Dyck (1599–1641), Flemish Baroque artist
- Anthony E. Van Dyke, American colonel
- Anthony Van Egmond (1778–1838), Canadian rebel
- Anthony Van Engelen (born 1978), American professional skateboarder
- Anthony van Hoboken (1887–1983), Dutch musicologist
- Anthony Wayne Van Leer (1783–1863), ironworks owner
- Anthony Van Loo (born 1988), Belgian footballer
- Anthony van Ryneveld (1925–2018), South African cricketer
- Anthony van Stralen, Lord of Merksem (c. 1521–1568), Belgian politician
- Anthony Van Wyck (1822–1900), American lawyer, politician, member of the Wisconsin Senate and county judge
- Anthony van Zijlvelt, Dutch Golden Age engraver and painter
- Anthony Vandal (born 1998), Canadian gridiron football player
- Anthony Varvaro (1984–2022), American baseball player
- Anthony Vasquez (born 1986), American baseball player
- Anthony Vaz (1932–1982), Kenyan field hockey player
- Anthony Vázquez (born 1988), Puerto Rican footballer
- Anthony Veasna So (1992–2020), American author
- Anthony Veiller (1903–1965), American screenwriter
- Anthony Scott Veitch (1914–1983), Australian writer
- Anthony Veke, Solomon Islands politician
- Anthony Velarde (born 1996), American soccer player
- Anthony Vella, Maltese judge
- Anthony Velonis (1911–1997), American painter and designer
- Anthony Venables (born 1953), British economist and the BP Professor of Economics
- Anthony Veneziano (born 1997), American baseball player
- Anthony Venn-Brown (born 1951), Australian evangelist
- Anthony Veranis (1938–1966), American boxer
- Anthony Verga (1935–2023), American politician
- Anthony Verrelli (born 1964), Member of the New Jersey General Assembly
- Anthony Veselovsky (1866–1939), imperial Russian division, corps and army commander
- Anthony Vidler (1941–2023), British architectural historian
- Anthony M. Villane (1929–2022), American dentist and politician
- Anthony Villanueva (1945–2014), Filipino boxer
- Anthony Vince (1902–1986), Canadian sprinter
- Anthony Vincent, multiple people
- Anthony Viti (born 1961), American artist
- Anthony Vivian, 5th Baron Vivian (1906–1991), British impresario-restaurateur
- Anthony Vizcaya, Venezuelan baseball player
- Anthony Vollack (1929–2015), American judge
- Anthony Volmink (born 1990), South African rugby union player
- Anthony Volpe (born 2001), American baseball player
- Anthony Vosalho (born 1975), French footballer
- Anthony Vreem, 17th century Dutch painter
- Anthony Cedric Vuagniaux (born 1977), Swiss musical artist
- Anthony Wager (1932–1990), English actor and television writer
- Anthony Wagner (1908–1995), English officer of arms at the College of Arms in London
- Anthony Waichulis (born 1972), American painter
- Anthony Wainaina, Kenyan MP
- Anthony Waite (born 1943), English cricketer
- Anthony Walker, several people
- Anthony Wall (born 1975), English golfer
- Anthony Wall, British documentary filmmaker
- Anthony Wall (1888–1989), British World War I flying ace
- Anthony Wallace, multiple people
- Anthony Waller (born 1959), Lebanese film director
- Anthony Walongwa (born 1993), Congolese and French international football player
- Anthony Walsh, multiple people
- Anthony Walters, multiple people
- Anthony Walton, multiple people
- Anthony Wambani (born 1999), Kenyan footballer
- Anthony Warlow (born 1961), Australian music theater performer
- Anthony Ward, British scenic designer
- Anthony Ward-Booth (1927–2002), British Army general
- Anthony Warde (1909–1975), American actor
- Anthony Warlow (born 1961), Australian singer and actor
- Anthony Warner, multiple people
- Anthony Washington (born 1958), American football player
- Anthony Washington (discus thrower) (born 1966), American discus thrower
- Anthony S. Waters, American artist
- Anthony Waters (1928–1987), Australian field hockey player
- Anthony Waters (born 1984), American football player
- Anthony Watkins (born 2000), German-American basketball player
- Anthony Watmough (born 1983), Australia international rugby league footballer
- Anthony Watsham (1924–2019), British entomologist
- Anthony Watson, several people
- Anthony Watts, several people
- Anthony Way (born 1982), English chorister and classical singer
- Anthony Wayne (1745–1796), American soldier, officer, statesman, and a Founding Father of the United States
- Anthony Weaver (born 1980), American football player and coach
- Anthony Webb, multiple people
- Anthony Weber (born 1987), French footballer
- Anthony Weekes, 16th century English politician
- Anthony Weiner (born 1964), American politician
- Anthony S. Weiss, Australian biochemist
- Anthony Welsh (born 1983), English actor
- Anthony Welters, American lawyer, business executive and philanthropist
- Anthony West, multiple people
- Anthony Weston, American logician
- Anthony Whelan (born 1959), Irish footballer and manager
- Anthony Whetstone (1927–2022), British Navy rear admiral
- Anthony Whishaw (born 1930), English artist
- Anthony Whitaker (1944–2014), New Zealand herpetologist
- Anthony White, several people
- Anthony Whiteman (born 1971), British middle-distance runner
- Anthony Whittaker, English composer
- Anthony Whyte, multiple people
- Anthony Wilden (1935–2019), British academic
- Anthony Wilding (1883–1915), New Zealand tennis player
- Anthony Wilkinson (born 1981), New Zealand cricketer
- Anthony Wilkinson (1835–1905), English cricketer and barrister
- Anthony William, self-proclaimed medium
- Anthony Williams, several people
- Anthony E. Wills, American writer
- Anthony Wilson, multiple people
- Anthony Wimberly (born 1962), American criminal and serial killer
- Anthony Winbush (born 1994), American football player
- Anthony Winchester (born 1983), American basketball player
- Anthony Windows (born 1942), English cricketer
- Anthony Wingfield, multiple people
- Anthony Winkler Prins (1817–1908), Dutch encyclopedist and writer
- Anthony Winston, American planter, judge and politician
- Anthony Wint (born 1995), American football player
- Anthony Wirig (born 1983), French chess grandmaster
- Anthony Wise, Fijian rugby union player
- Anthony Wolfe (born 1983), Trinidadian professional footballer
- Anthony Hurt Wolley-Dod (1861–1948), English botanist
- Anthony Wong, several people
- Anthony Wonke, British documentary filmmaker
- Anthony Wood, multiple people
- Anthony Woode, Ghanaian trade unionist
- Anthony Woods-Scawen (1918–1940), Royal Air Force officer
- Anthony Woods, American football player
- Anthony Woods (born 1980), American politician
- Anthony Woodson (born 1988), Canadian football player
- Anthony Woodville, 2nd Earl Rivers, 15th century English noble, courtier and writer
- Anthony Woolley (born 1971), English cricketer
- Anthony Wordsworth (born 1989), English footballer
- Anthony Worth (1940–2017), English farmer and politician
- Anthony Wotton (c. 1561–1626), English clergyman and controversialist
- Anthony Wright, multiple people
- Anthony Wu (born 1954), standing committee member of the Chinese People’s Political Consultative Conference
- Anthony Xuerub (born 1970), Australian rugby league player
- Anthony J. Xydias (1879–1952), American film producer
- Anthony Yadgaroff, British businessman
- Anthony Yarde (born 1991), British professional boxer
- Anthony Yates (1930–2004), English rheumatologist and consultant
- Anthony Yeo (died 2009), Singaporean counselor
- Anthony Yerkovich, American television producer and writer
- Anthony Yezer, American economist
- Anthony Yigit (born 1991), Swedish Olympian boxer
- Anthony Youdeowei, Nigerian academic
- Anthony Young, several people
- Anthony C. Yu (1938–2015), Chinese-American Sinologist and theologian
- Anthony Yuen (1946–2020), American editor
- Anthony Zaccaria, 16th century Italian saint
- Anthony Zador, American neuroscientist
- Anthony Zahn (1976–2020), American cyclist
- Anthony Zambrano (born 1998), Colombian sprinter
- Anthony Zarb, Maltese strongman
- Anthony Zboralski, French businessperson
- Anthony Zee, Chinese-American physicist, writer, and a professor at the Kavli Institute for Theoretical Physics
- Anthony Zerbe (born 1936), American actor
- Anthony Joseph Zerilli (1927–2015), Italian-American mobster
- Anthony Zettel (born 1992), American football player
- Anthony Zhang Gangyi (1907–1997), Chinese Franciscan priest
- Anthony Zimbulis (1918–1963), Australian cricketer
- Anthony Zingg (born 1993), German judoka
- Anthony Zinni (born 1943), American Marine Corps general
- Anthony Zinno (born 1981), American poker player
- Anthony Zizzo (1935–2006), American mobster
- Anthony E. Zuiker (born 1968), American screenwriter
- Anthony Zuppero, American nuclear scientist

=== Fictional characters ===
- Anthony Bridgerton, a fictional character from the Netflix TV series Bridgerton, portrayed by English actor Jonathan Bailey
- Anthony "Tony" Soprano, main protagonist of The Sopranos, portrayed by American actor James Gandolfini
- Anthony "AJ" Soprano Jr, the son of Tony Soprano from The Sopranos
- Anthony DiNozzo, a fictional character from the CBS TV series NCIS, portrayed by American actor Michael Weatherly
- Anthony Stark, better known as Iron Man (nicknamed Tony)
- Anthony Zimmer, a 2005 French romantic thriller film written and directed by Jérôme Salle and starring Sophie Marceau, Yvan Attal, and Sami Frey

== See also ==
- Anthony (disambiguation)
- Anthony (surname)
- Andoni (given name)
- Anthon (given name)
- Anthoney
- Anthoni, name
- Anton (given name)
- Antoni
- Antonis
- Antonio
- Antonius
- Antony
- Antonia (name)
- Antoine
- Anfernee
- Thony (name)
- Tony (given name)
