= Anthony Frew =

British pulmonologist (1955–2018)

Anthony James Frew FRCP (April 1955 – 28 November 2018) was a professor of allergy and respiratory medicine at the Royal Sussex County Hospital in Brighton, England.

== Early life ==
Frew grew up in Essex. His father was a GP. He was educated at a prep school near Ashdown Forest and won a scholarship to Westminster School. He studied medicine at Cambridge and trained in respiratory medicine.

== Career ==
Frew was a high-profile member of the acute medical, respiratory and allergy teams at the Royal Sussex County Hospital which he joined in 2005.

Frew died in Brighton in November 2018.

== Personal life ==
Frew was married to Helen Smith and had four children. He loved travelling and classical music.
