= Anthony Sclafani =

American neuroscientist (born 1944)

Anthony Sclafani (born 1944) is an American neuroscientist and a Emeritus Distinguished Professor at Brooklyn College of the City University of New York.
