= Anthony Arthur =

Anthony Arthur may refer to:

- Anthony Arthur (author) (1937–2009), American author
- Anthony Arthur (weightlifter) (born 1973), British weightlifter
