= Anthony Mancini =

Anthony Mancini is the name of:

- Anthony Mancini (bishop), Canadian bishop
- Anthony Gomez Mancini, French footballer
