= Anthony A. Grace =

American neuroscientist

Anthony A. Grace is an American neuroscientist, currently a Distinguished Professor of Neuroscience and Professor of Psychiatry and Psychology at University of Pittsburgh, including working in neurophysiology of basal ganglia system related to psychiatric disorders.
