= Anthony Bucardo =

American racing cyclist

Personal information
- Full name: Anthony Bucardo
- Nickname: Shibby
- Born: 27 August 1998 (age 28) California, U.S.

Cycling career
- Sport: Cycling
- Current team: Haro/US
- Discipline: BMX racing
- Role: Rider
- Rider type: Elite Men
Medal record
Representing United States
Men's BMX racing
Event	1st	2nd	3rd
USA Elite Men National Championship	1	0	0
Total	1	0	0
USA Elite Men National Championship
Gold medal – first place	2023 Tulsa	BMX racing

Anthony Bucardo (born 27 August 1998) is an American racing cyclist who represents the US in BMX.

== Pro career ==
In 2019 Bucardo won the Golden Crank Award for Rookie Pro of the Year. Which would lead into him signing a 2 year deal with Haro's BMX Racing team to replace Olympian Nicholas Long.

At the beginning of 2023 Bucardo would win the ELITE MEN USA BMX NATIONAL TITLE. Later in 2023 Bucardo would crash in Round 9 of the 2023 European Cup in Sakarya, Turkey causing a serious injury to his elbow which would make him miss a majority of the international racing in 2023. Bucardo returned to the international circuit for the final 2 rounds (9 & 10) of the UCI BMX World Cup racing in Santiago Del Estero. In Bucardos first action since injury he finished 50th in round 9 and 34th in round 10. Bucardo would later be quoted by reporters saying "I am just happy to be able to race. I can’t wait for more moving forward with more time on my bike. God got me n we learn from these hard times."

On September 15, 2023, Bucardo would announce via his Instagram that at the end of the 2023 season he will be parting ways with Haro and racing elsewhere in 2024.

== Music career ==
Bucardo has been known mainly for his ability behind the bike but what most people don't know is that he has a second career in music. Bucardo goes by the rap name "Yung Shibby" which stems from his lifelong nickname of Shibby. Bucardo created and shared most of his music on his Sound Cloud account under his rap name Yung Shibby. Yung Shibby's most popular song would come in 2018 when he released ELEVATE FT. QB CAM which would have a feature from fellow BMX Rider Cameron Moore under the rap name "QB Cam".
