= Anthony Heidrich =

Australian cricketer (born 1968)

Personal information
- Born: 25 June 1968 (age 58); Woodville, South Australia
- Source: Cricinfo, 6 August 2020

Anthony Heidrich (born 25 June 1968) is an Australian cricketer. He played in one List A match for South Australia in 1993–94.

== See also ==
- List of South Australian representative cricketers
