= Anthony Bonvisi =

Italian emigrant to England (1470s–1558)

- Born: 1470
- Died: 1558 (aged 87–88)
- Occupation: Merchant

Anthony Bonvisi (1470s–1558) was an Italian emigrant to England. He was a merchant who improved spinning methods in Devon. He was also a correspondent and Friend of Thomas Cromwell.
