= Anthony Mantle =

Anthony Mantle may refer to:

- Anthony Dod Mantle (born 1955), British cinematographer
- Anthony Jacques Mantle (1899–1988), Royal Naval Air Service pilot
