= Anthony McWhirter =

Scottish footballer

Personal information
- Full name: Anthony McWhirter
- Date of birth: 6 September 1872
- Place of birth: Ayr, Scotland
- Date of death: 1932 (aged 59–60)
- Position: Half back

Senior career*
Years	Team	Apps	(Gls)
1885	Great Lever		
1886–1889	Partick Thistle		
1889–1890	Bolton Wanderers	4	(0)
1890	Ardwick		
- * Club domestic league appearances and goals

Anthony McWhirter (6 September 1872 – 1932) was a Scottish footballer who played in the Football League for Bolton Wanderers.
