= Anthony Dzamefe =

Ghanaian businessman

Anthony Mensah Dzamefe
- Born: December 12, 1991 (age 34); Volta Region, Ghana
- Occupation: Businessman
- Known for: Founder of the company Caveman Watches

Anthony Dzamefe is a Ghanaian businessman and founder of the company Caveman Watches. The company was launched in Ghana by Dzamefe on 12 December 2018.

Dzamefe began selling watches in Kantamanto Market in Accra in 2015, purchasing his first watch for GH₵50 ($4) and selling it at a profit and learning how to create watch straps from a cobbler.

== Early life ==
Dzamefe originally hails from Lume, but he grew up in Ho in Volta Region of Ghana.

== Recognition ==
Dzamefe has won several awards in Ghana, including Entrepreneur of the Year 2019 and Emerging Brand of the Year by the Young Achievers Summit 2019. Since then, The New York Times, Forbes, and other magazines have profiled him. In 2022 Dzamefe was selected as one of the 2022 Young Achievers and Innovators in Ghana at the Head of States Gold Awards.

=== Recognition of Anthony Dzamefe ===
- 100 most influential young leaders in Africa-(2021)
- Avance media-50 most influential young Ghanaians-(2021)
- Africa Youth Awards- Entrepreneur of the year-(2020)
- Global Icon Youth Entrepreneur- Honoree of the Hall of Excellence (YEA HONOREE) -(2019)
- Technology and Innovation Entrepreneur of the year at the Ghana Forty Under 40 Award- (2019)
- The YCEO Top 50 young CEOs-(2019)
- Young Achievers Summit-Overall Entrepreneur of the year (2019)
- Future of Ghana-Top 30 pioneers for (2019)

=== Recognition of his company Caveman GH ===
- Emy Africa Awards – Brand of the year (2021)
- Ghana Manufacturing Awards – Product of the Year: The Blue Volta Watch (2021)
- Ghana Manufacturing Awards – Watch manufacturing company of the year (2021)
- Young Achievers Summit – Emerging Brand of the year (2019)
- Clique Empire -Youth Event Awards- TIMEPIECEGH-Emerging Youth Innovator (2018)
