= Anthony Morgan Rodman =

American political figure

Anthony (Morgan) Rodman was the executive director of the White House Council on Native American Affairs in the Biden administration, a position he previously held in the Obama administration. He graduated from Harvard University and the James E. Rogers College of Law.

Rodman is a member of both the Cherokee Nation and the Osage Nation.
