= Anthony Brookby =

English Franciscan theologian and Catholic martyr

Anthony Brookby (Brorbey) (executed 19 July 1537) was an English Franciscan theologian. He offended Henry VIII, and became a Catholic martyr.

Brookby was a lecturer in theology at Magdalen College, Oxford. He was versed in Greek and Hebrew, and enjoyed a reputation as an eloquent preacher. In one sermon, Brookby attacked the king's actions and mode of living.

He was arrested, put to the rack, and tortured in order to make him retract what he had said. Disabled as a result of his tortures, Brookby was cared for by a pious woman for a fortnight. By the command of the king, an executioner strangled him to death, with the Franciscan cord which he wore around his waist.

The year of his death has been questioned, with the Victoria County History for Kent placing the event in 1534.

Friar Anthony Brookby was declared venerable by Pope Leo XIII in 1886
