= Anthony Cartwright =

Anthony Cartwright may refer to:

- Anthony Cartwright (cricketer) (1940–2023), New Zealand cricket player
- Anthony Cartwright (writer) (born 1973), British novelist
