= Anthony Gumbiner =

British businessman based in Monte Carlo

Anthony Joseph Gumbiner is a British businessman based in Monte Carlo who is chairman of Hallwood Group.
