= Anthony Foyt =

Anthony Foyt may refer to:

- A. J. Foyt, (born 1935), U.S. racing driver who rarely goes by "Anthony"
- A. J. Foyt IV (born 1984), U.S. race car driver who commonly goes by the name "Anthony" to differentiate himself from his grandfather
