= Anthony J. Antelo Devereux =

American polo player

Anthony J. Antelo Devereux (1878–1940) was polo player and the winner of the National Hunt Cup.
