= Anthony Modeste =

Anthony Modeste may refer to:

- Anthony Modeste (French footballer)
- Anthony Modeste (Grenadian footballer)
