= Anthony Holles =

Anthony Holles may refer to:

- Anthony Holles (figure skater) (born 1939), former British pair skater
- Anthony Holles (actor) (1901–1950), British film actor
