= Anthony Muto =

Anthony Muto may refer to:

- Anthony Muto (fashion designer), American fashion designer
- Anthony Muto (director), American film director
