= Anthony Buller =

Anthony Buller may refer to:

- Anthony Buller (Callington MP) (1613–1679), English soldier and member of parliament
- Sir Anthony Buller (West Looe MP) (1780–1866), English lawyer and member of parliament
