= Anthony Sabatino =

American art director

Anthony Sabatino (October 30, 1944 – April 10, 1993) was an art director who won an Emmy Award for his work on the TV series Fun House.

Sabatino also worked on Soul Train, where his career began in 1971. He died from AIDS complications on April 10, 1993, aged 48.
