= Anthony Solomon =

Anthony Solomon may refer to:

- Anthony M. Solomon (1919–2008), American economist
- Anthony Solomon (basketball) (born 1964), American college basketball coach
