= Anthony Mora =

Anthony Mora may refer to:

- Anthony Mora (public relations) (born 1951), American writer
- Anthony Mora (born 1977), Mexican American boxer, brother of Adrian Mora
