= Anthony Methuen =

Anthony Methuen may refer to:

- Anthony Methuen, 5th Baron Methuen (1891–1975), British soldier, architect and peer
- John Methuen, 6th Baron Methuen (1925–1994), British peer
