= Anthony Lechmere =

Anthony Lechmere may refer to:

- Anthony Lechmere (MP) (1674–1720), MP for Bewdley and for Tewkesbury
- Sir Anthony Lechmere, 1st Baronet (1766–1849), grandson of the MP
