= Anthony Wilkinson (New Zealand cricketer) =

New Zealand cricketer (born 1981)

Personal information
- Full name: Anthony Mark Wilkinson
- Born: 15 August 1981 (age 45); Dunedin, New Zealand
- Batting: Left-handed
- Bowling: Left-arm medium

Domestic team information
- Years: Team
- 1999/00: Dunedin Metropolitan
- 2001/02–2002/03: Otago
- Source: ESPNcricinfo, 28 May 2016

Anthony Mark Wilkinson (born 15 August 1981) is a New Zealand former cricketer. He played one first-class and one List A match for Otago at the beginning of the 21st century.

Wilkinson was born at Dunedin in 1981. He played age-group cricket for Otago from the 1997–98 season onwards and plated twice for Dunedin Metropolitan in the Hawke Cup during the 1999–2000 season.

A left-arm medium pace bowler, Wilkinson made his senior debut for Otago in a List A match against Central Districts in January 2002. He scored 14 runs on debut but did not take a wicket from 10 overs. The following season he played his only first-class match, again failing to take a wicket against Central Districts. He played club cricket for the North East Valley side.
