= Anthony Foster (activist) =

Australian activist (1953–2017)

- Born: 12 January 1953; Oakleigh, Victoria
- Died: 28 May 2017 (aged 64)
- Occupation: Activist
- Parent(s): Ken and Joyce Foster

Anthony Foster (12 January 1953 – 28 May 2017) was an Australian activist who was well known for his activism work on behalf of child sexual abuse victims.

Daniel Andrews, Victorian premier, described him as the "embodiment of grace".

== Life and career ==
Anthony Foster was born on 12 January 1953 in Oakleigh, Victoria to Ken and Joyce Foster, a Methodist family, who were emigrants from the United Kingdom. He married fellow activist Chrissie.

In the 1980s, his two daughters were sexually abused and to get justice he became a life-long activist. His wife wrote a book titled Hell on the Way to Heaven on their experiences.

Foster died in 2017 due to brain haemorrhage. On his death, he was given a state funeral.
