= Anthony Coombs =

Anthony Coombs may refer to:

- Anthony Coombs (politician) (born 1952), British Conservative politician and company director
- Anthony Coombs (Canadian football) (born 1992), Canadian football running back
