= Anthony Ingram =

Anthony Ingram may refer to:

- Anthony Ingram, basketball player for Northern Arizona Lumberjacks 1985–87
- Anthony Lee-Ingram (born 1988), American basketball player
