= Anthony Irby =

Anthony Irby may refer to:

- Anthony Irby (died 1625), English Master of Chancery, Recorder and Member of Parliament for Boston
- Anthony Irby (1577–1610), his son, (English Member of Parliament?)
- Anthony Irby (1605–1682), the latter's son, English Member of Parliament for Boston
