= Anthony Rodriguez =

Anthony Rodriguez may refer to:

- Anthony Rodriguez (judoka) (born 1979), French judoka
- Anthony Rodriguez (politician) (born 1988), member of the Florida House of Representatives
