= The Bengal Club =

Social club in Kolkata, India

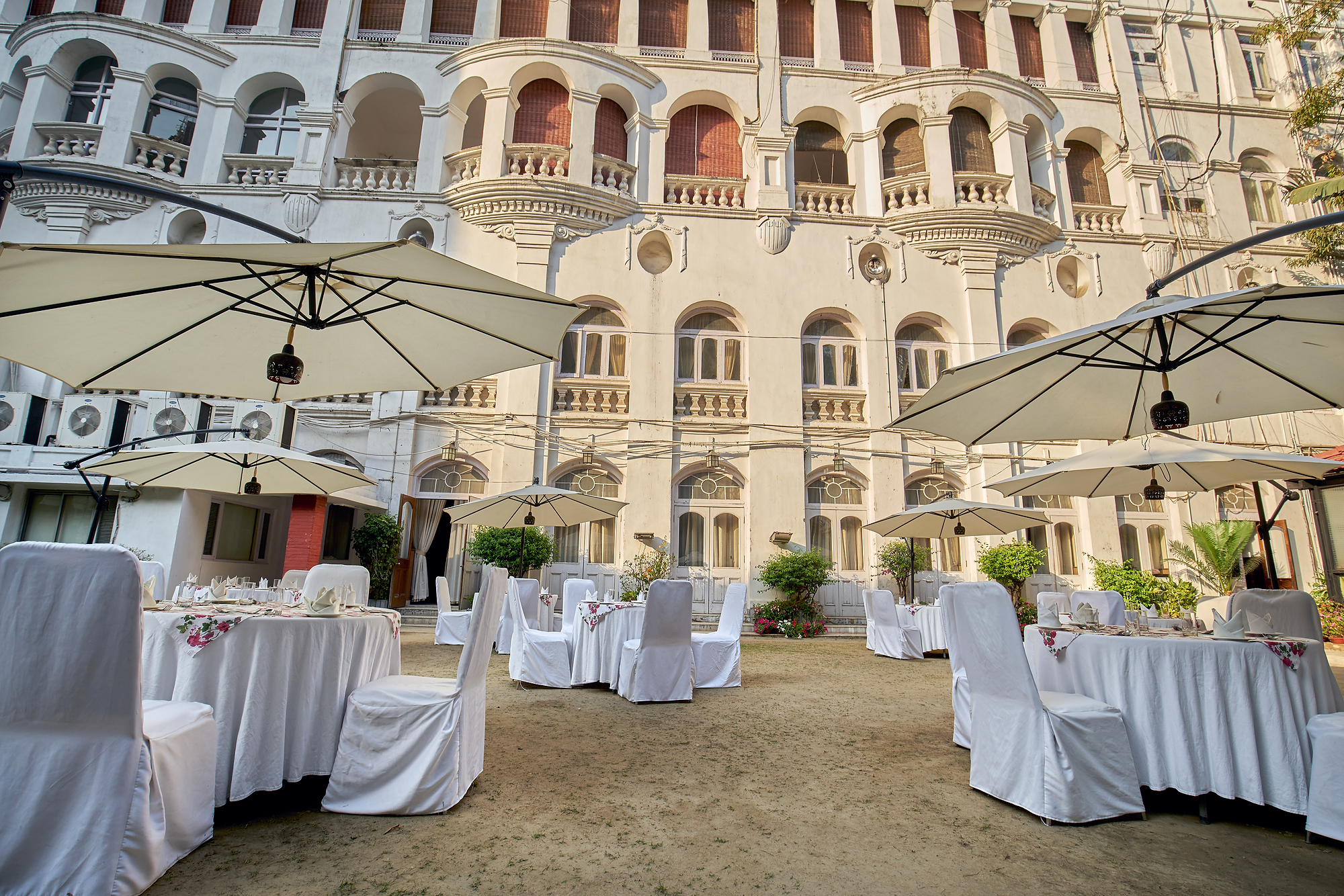
- The Bengal Club
- Formation: 1827; 199 years ago
- Type: Social club
- Location: Kolkata, West Bengal, India
- President: Sumit Ray
- Website: www.thebengalclub.com

The Bengal Club is a social and business club in Kolkata, India. Founded in 1827, the club is the oldest social club in India. When Kolkata was the capital of British India, the club was considered to be the "unofficial headquarters of the Raj". The club is nowadays known for its old-world ambience and patronage among contemporary social and corporate elites, and is among a small number of Indian clubs featured in the elite list of the "Platinum Clubs of the World".

== History ==
Works that provide detailed historical information about the club include A Short History of the Bengal Club 1827–1927, a book by Sir Hugh Rahere Panckridge (Barrister-at-law and later judge of the Calcutta High Court); The Bengal Club 1927–1970, a book by R.I. Macalpine (former officer of the Imperial Forest Service); A History of The Bengal Club (1970–2000), a booklet by Arabinda Ray (former club president and senior corporate executive); and The Bengal Club in History, a book edited by academic Malabika Sarkar.

=== 19th century ===
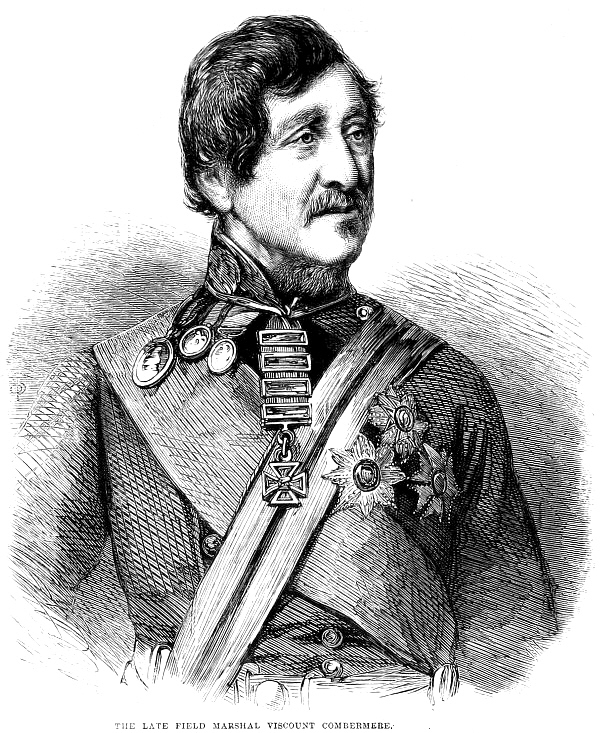
1st Viscount Combermere

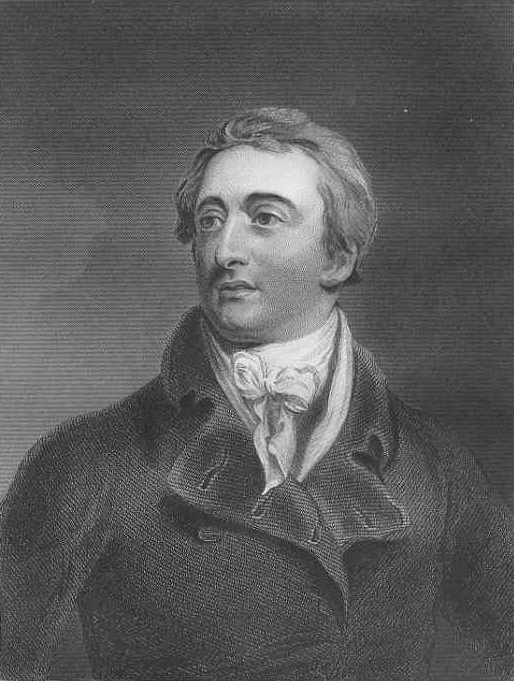
Lord William Bentinck

Panckridge writes that the Bengal Club predates many important social clubs in London, though the model for the club was the Oriental Club in London (founded in 1824). The idea for the Bengal Club was conceived of in a meeting of notable Englishmen at the Town Hall of Calcutta in 1826, led by Lieutenant-Colonel (later Lieutenant-General) John Finch, son of the 4th Earl of Aylesford. Finch explained at the meeting that "nothing like a respectable hotel or coffeehouse has ever existed" in Calcutta, and "those who constitute the society of Calcutta have no place where they can spend an idle half hour agreeably"

The club was formally established on 8 February 1827, with the Viscount Combermere its first patron. In 1830, Lord William Bentinck, the last Governor of Bengal and the first Governor-General of India, became the second patron of the club. The club's original members included influential figures like Charles Metcalfe, Henry Thoby Prinsep and Sir Edward Ryan, along with senior military officials. In 1838, the club passed a resolution to reciprocate with the now-extinct Byculla Club of Mumbai (then Bombay). Later, reciprocal relations were established with the Madras Club, the Hong Kong Club and the now-defunct Shanghai Club.

By the 1870s, the club was being described in travelogues as "the most swell establishment of the kind in the East" (by American Civil War general Robert Ogden Tyler) and "an institution known to all the dwellers of the East" (by scholar and historian Sir George William Forrest). By the close of the century, the Bengal Club became one of a handful of buildings in British India to be supplied with electricity.

Panckridge writes that the Bengal Club was originally intended to be called the Calcutta United Service Club. Ironically, a later (unconnected) institution with a similar name, the Bengal United Service Club (now home to the Geological Survey of India), was established in close proximity to the Bengal Club. Much like the Bengal Club, the club had senior British officials and judges as members.

=== 20th century ===
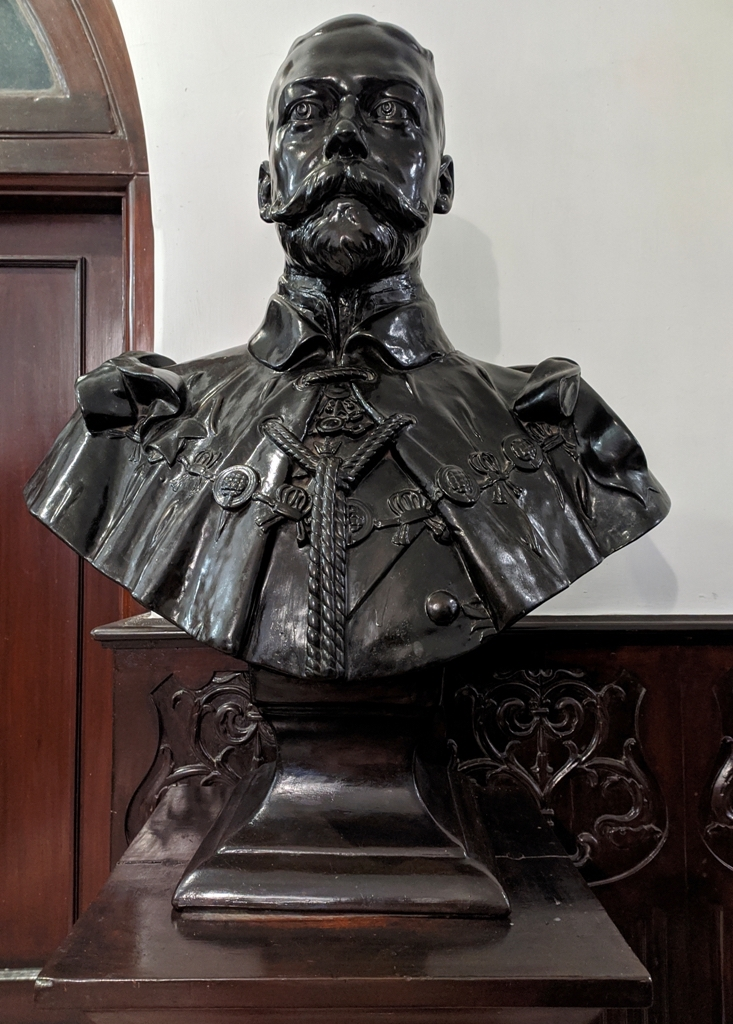
Bust of George V at the Bengal Club.

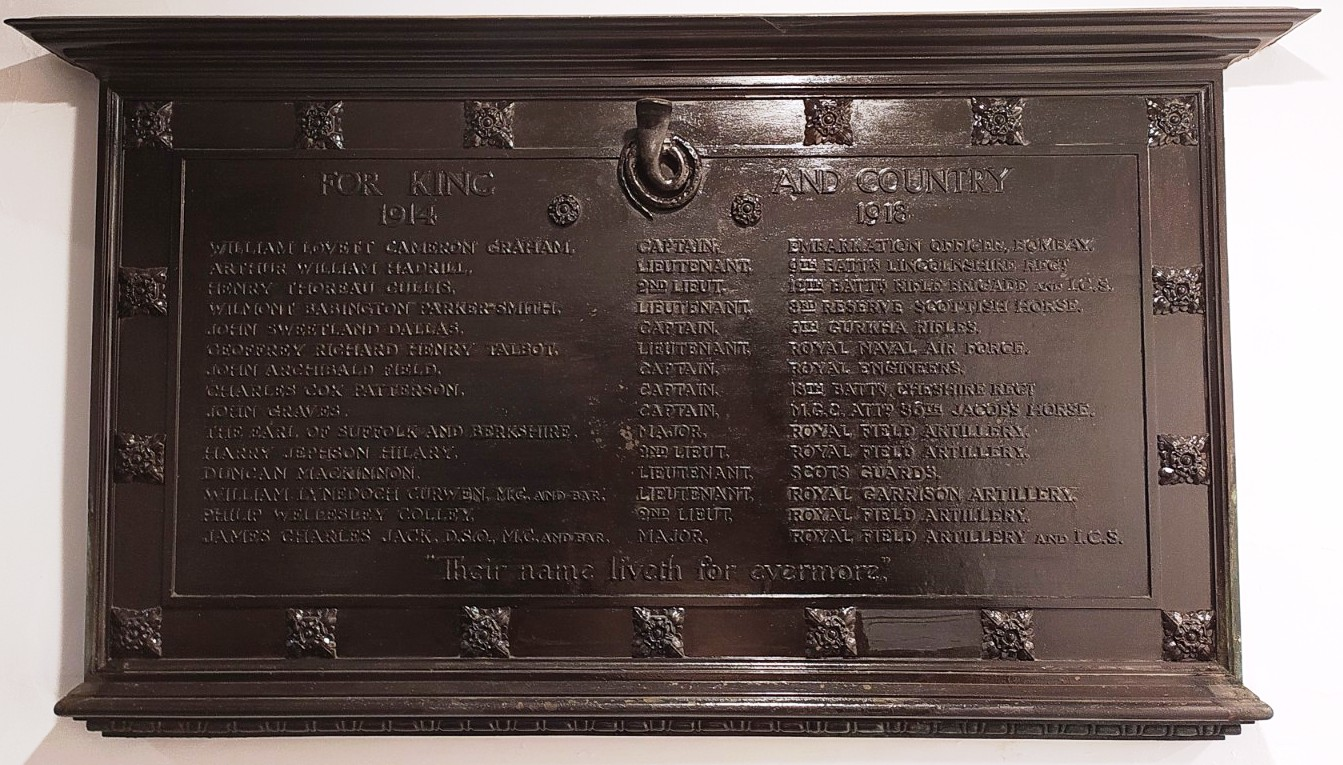
Plaque at the Bengal Club with names of members who died while serving in the First World War.

In 1912, on the visit of George V to Kolkata, the club was among a set of buildings illuminated with electric lights to welcome his cavalcade. The King presented the club with his portrait. Over a hundred members of the club served in the First World War. Two members were awarded the Victoria Cross: army doctor Arthur Martin-Leake (the first person to have received the honour twice) and Sir Reginald Graham. Several members also lost their lives in the War. The Governor of Bengal later unveiled a plaque in their memory. In 1927, the Bengal Club celebrated its centenary by organising a grand banquet, with many important figures from British India in attendance. The following day, for the first time in the club's history, female guests were allowed to enter the club for a one-off tour.

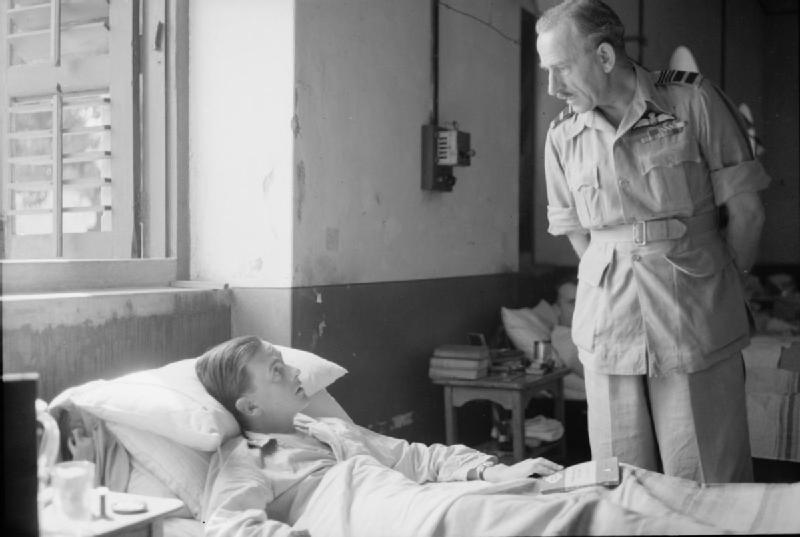
A Royal Air Force hospital in Kolkata, during the Second World War. In the course of the War, over a thousand military officers stationed in the city (above the rank of Lieutenant-colonel) were granted honorary membership of the Bengal Club.

According to Macalpine, the club's other milestones in the 20th century included its designation as a public air raid shelter and medical aid post during the Second World War; the grant of honorary membership to around 1,200 armed forces personnel stationed in Kolkata during different phases of the War (above the rank of Lieutenant-colonel); the admittance of Indian members (in 1959); the allowance of women inside the club's premises (initially in fits and starts, and eventually without restriction in 1967); the receipt of valuable paintings and artefacts (gifted by club members and presidents); and visits by many notable dignitaries and public figures.

However, Macalpine also chronicles the club as suffering from a series of financial setbacks during this period, exacerbated by the fact that the club's membership size was small and highly selective. The 1934 Nepal–India earthquake apparently caused great damage to the club's building and necessitated costly repairs, while a large number of expensive renovations were also undertaken in successive decades. Meanwhile, the Second World War resulted in food and alcohol shortages, and an atmosphere of panic followed the bombing of Kolkata by Japan. Macalpine claims that the club's revenues were further dented by strikes by "menial" staff motivated by "anti-British" sentiment, and various excise, prohibition and labour laws. By the late 1960s, the club's finances were so badly hit that it sold half of its premises.

Ray states that the club celebrated its 150th anniversary in 1977 with a large banquet (with the British High Commissioner to India and the Governor of West Bengal in attendance), allowed women to become members in their own right in 1988, and increased facilities offered to members significantly from the 1990s onwards.

=== 21st century ===
Sarkar and her co-contributors generally describe the Bengal Club as continuing with many British-era traditions in the present century. The international press has provided a similar description of the club, variously referring to its menus, decor, artworks, dress codes and waiters' uniforms. Among events of note, the club has hosted the award ceremony for the 2004 Commonwealth Writers' Prize, where The Curious Incident of the Dog in the Night-Time and A Distant Shore were awarded the top prizes.

== Facilities ==
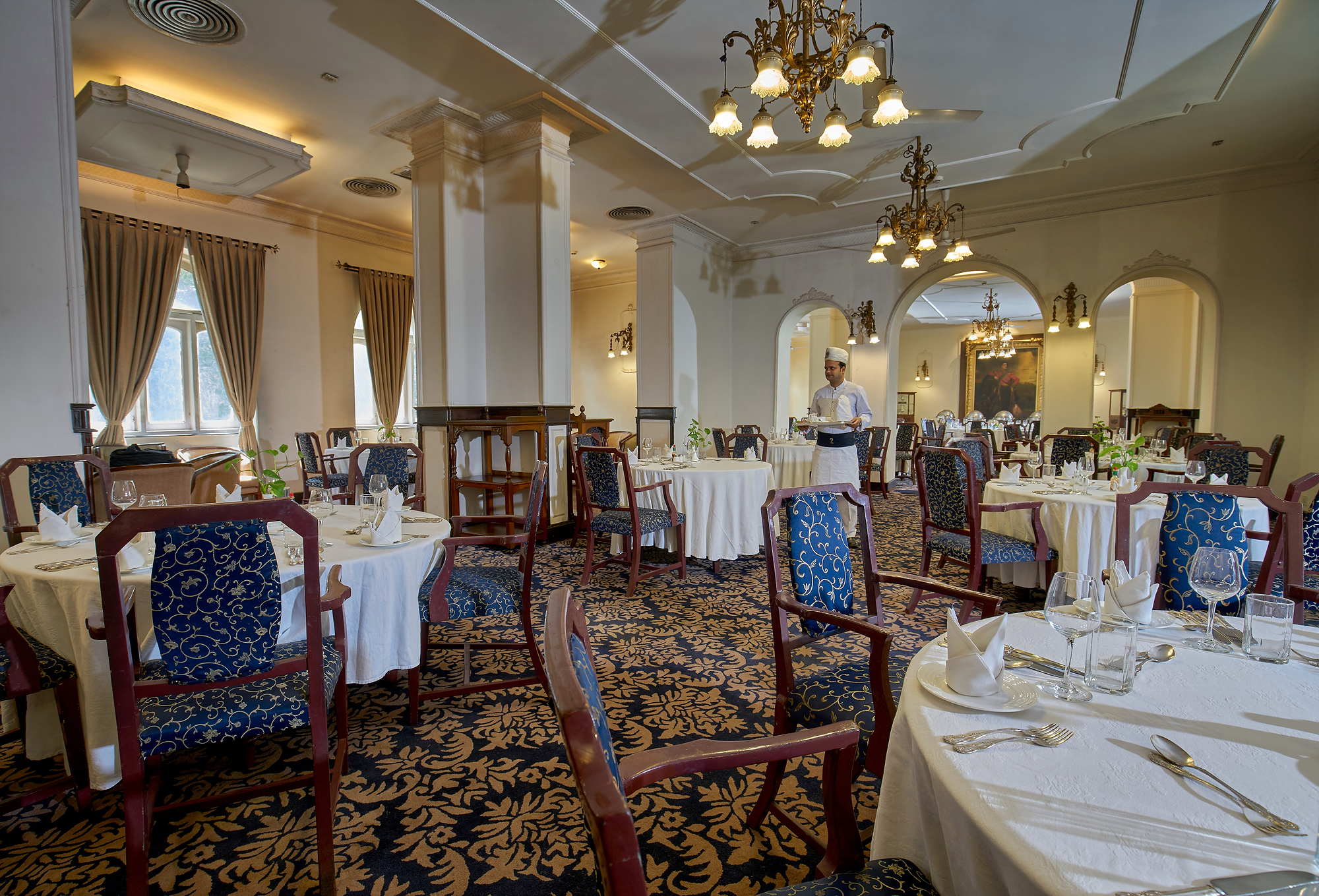
One of the Bengal Club's dining rooms

Travel books from the 19th century suggest that the Bengal Club was then one of Kolkata's principal luxury accommodations, along with the Great Eastern Hotel and the Spence's Hotel (now demolished). One visitor from that period, John Fletcher Hurst, described the club as "a delightful resort" with "spacious and beautiful" bedrooms and a well-stocked library. The club's present facilities include accommodation rooms, banquet halls, bars, lounges, dining rooms, conference rooms, a library and indoor sports facilities. The club's website lists various clubs in India and overseas as among its affiliated clubs.

== Food and culinary history ==
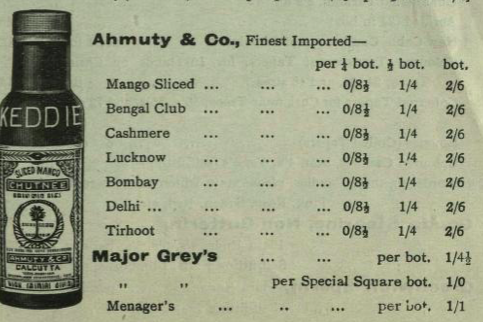
Advertisement for "Bengal Club chutney" in a 1912 Harrods catalogue

In the 19th century, the Bengal Cub's food and drink was spoken of favourably in a number of travelogues and cookbooks. The club's head chef was a French cook, who later became the private cook of the Nawab of Oudh. Food historian Colleen Taylor Sen credits the Bengal Club with pioneering and popularising the masala omelette. At one point, the club supposedly housed "four cooks who made nothing but omelettes all day long and wouldn't soil their hands doing anything else." The club was also known for a type of sweet mango chutney. Internationally, the item became generically known as "Bengal Club chutney" and was marketed by different traders under that name. Harrods and Eaton's also sold versions of the item.

In modern times, various books have discussed the club's culinary history and shared some of its signature recipes. Condé Nast Traveler has listed the Bengal Club's orange soufflé as one of eight recommended recipes from colonial Indian clubs, and mentioned its biryani as one of the best examples of home-made Kolkata biryani.

== Relocations and architectural history ==
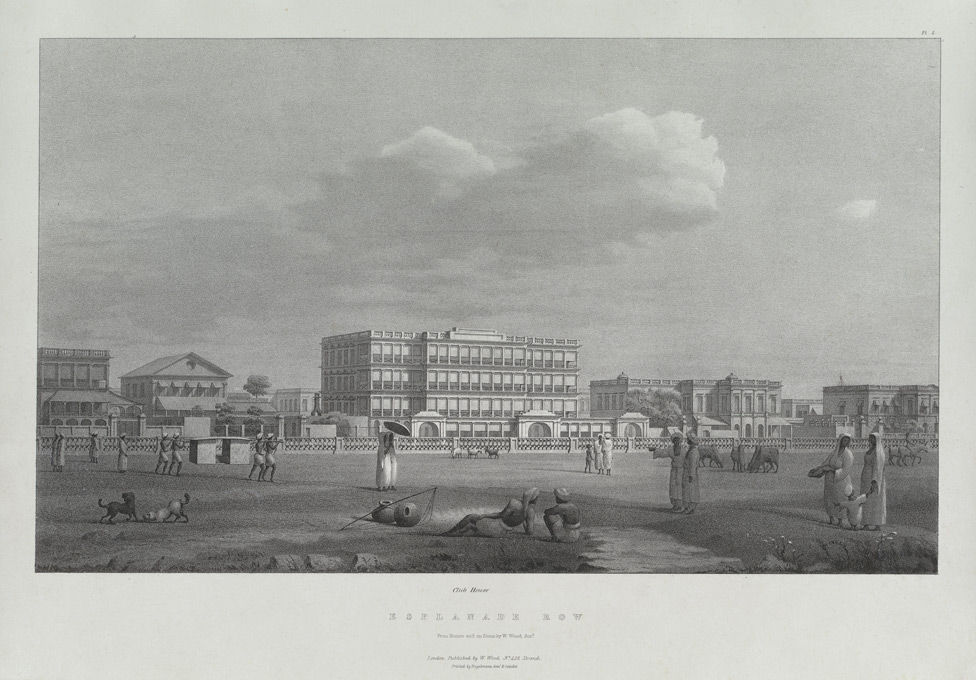
The Bengal Club in 1833 (Gordon's Buildings)

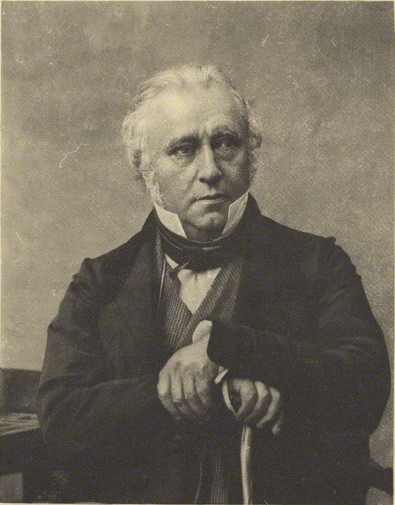
Thomas Macaulay

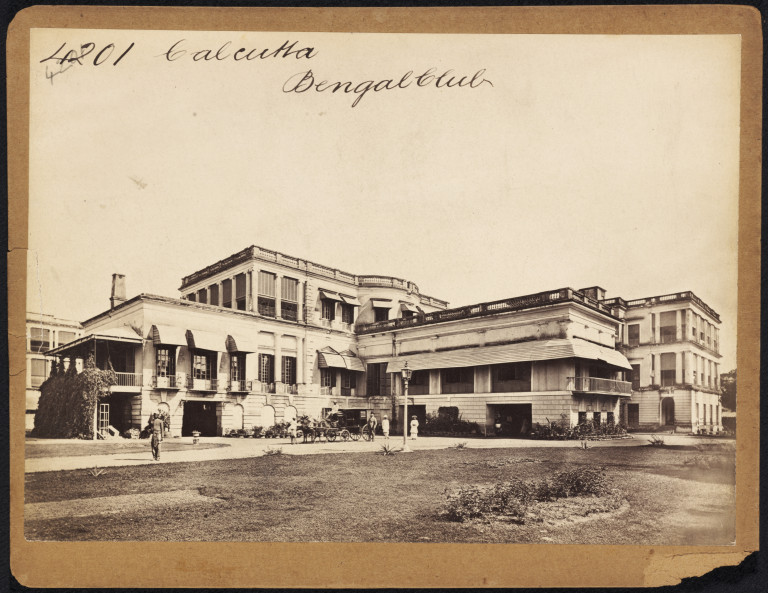
The Bengal Club c. 1850 (Macaulay's former residence)

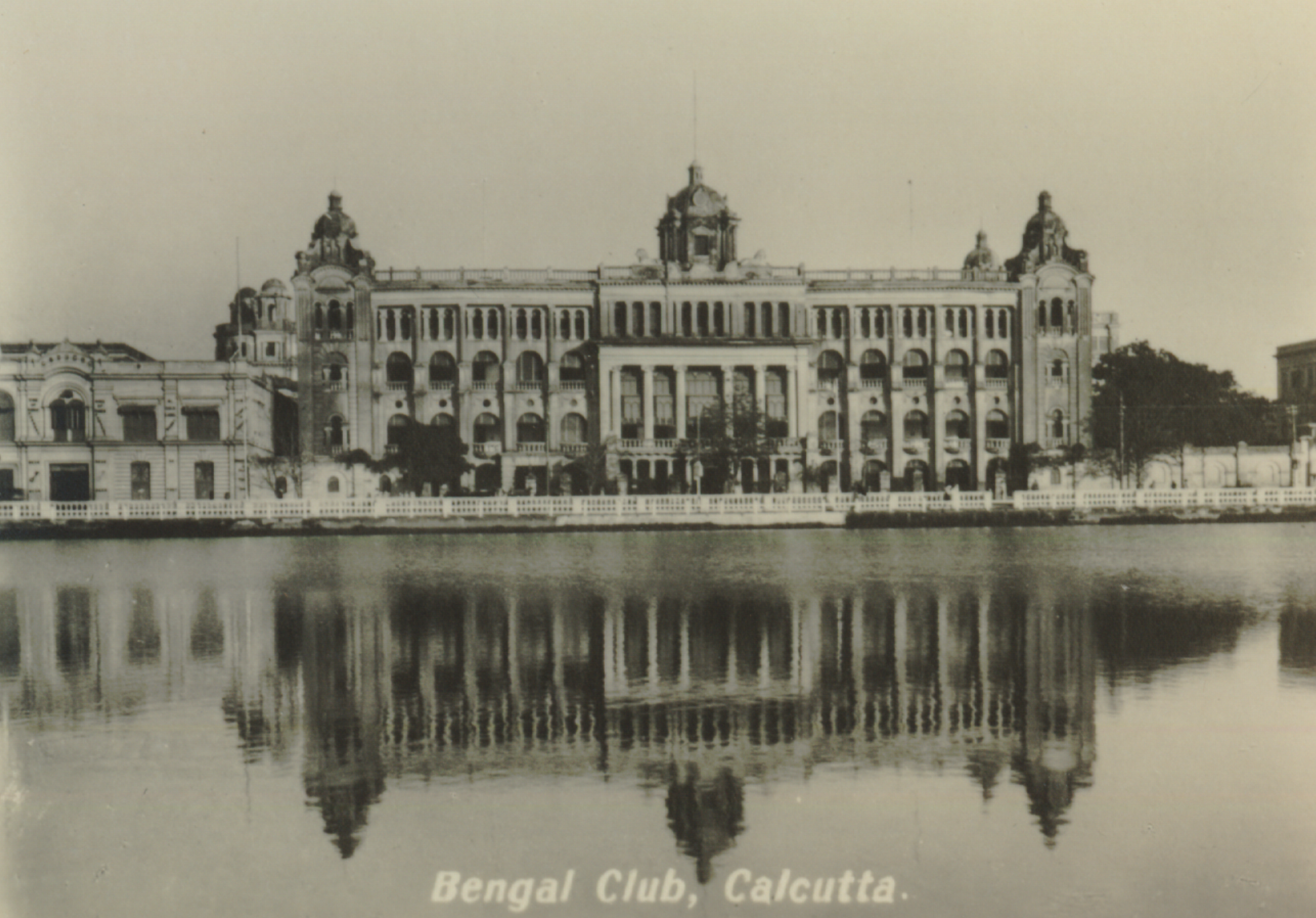
The Bengal Club's Chowringhee building, designed by Vincent Esch

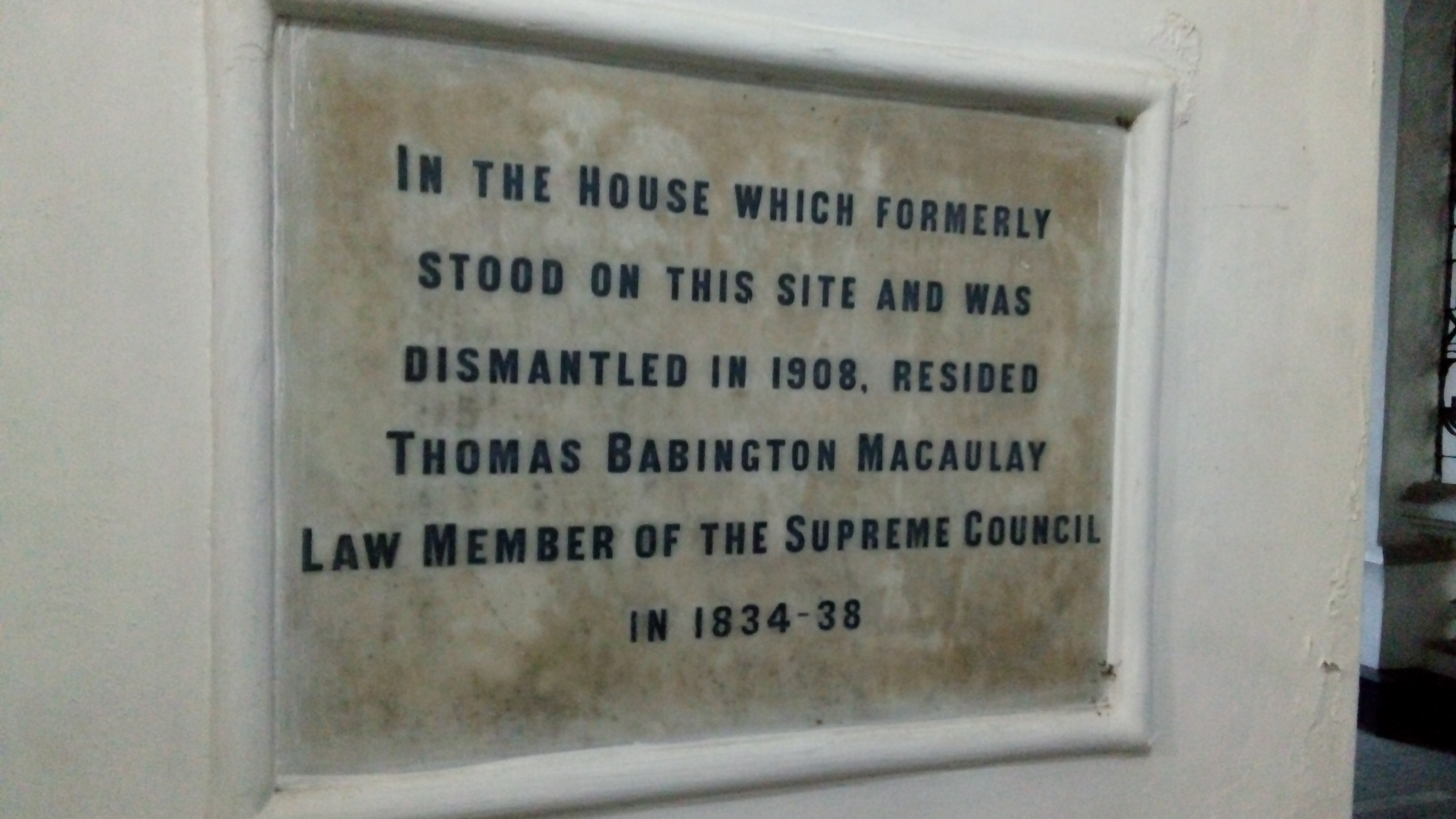
Plaque at the club's entrance

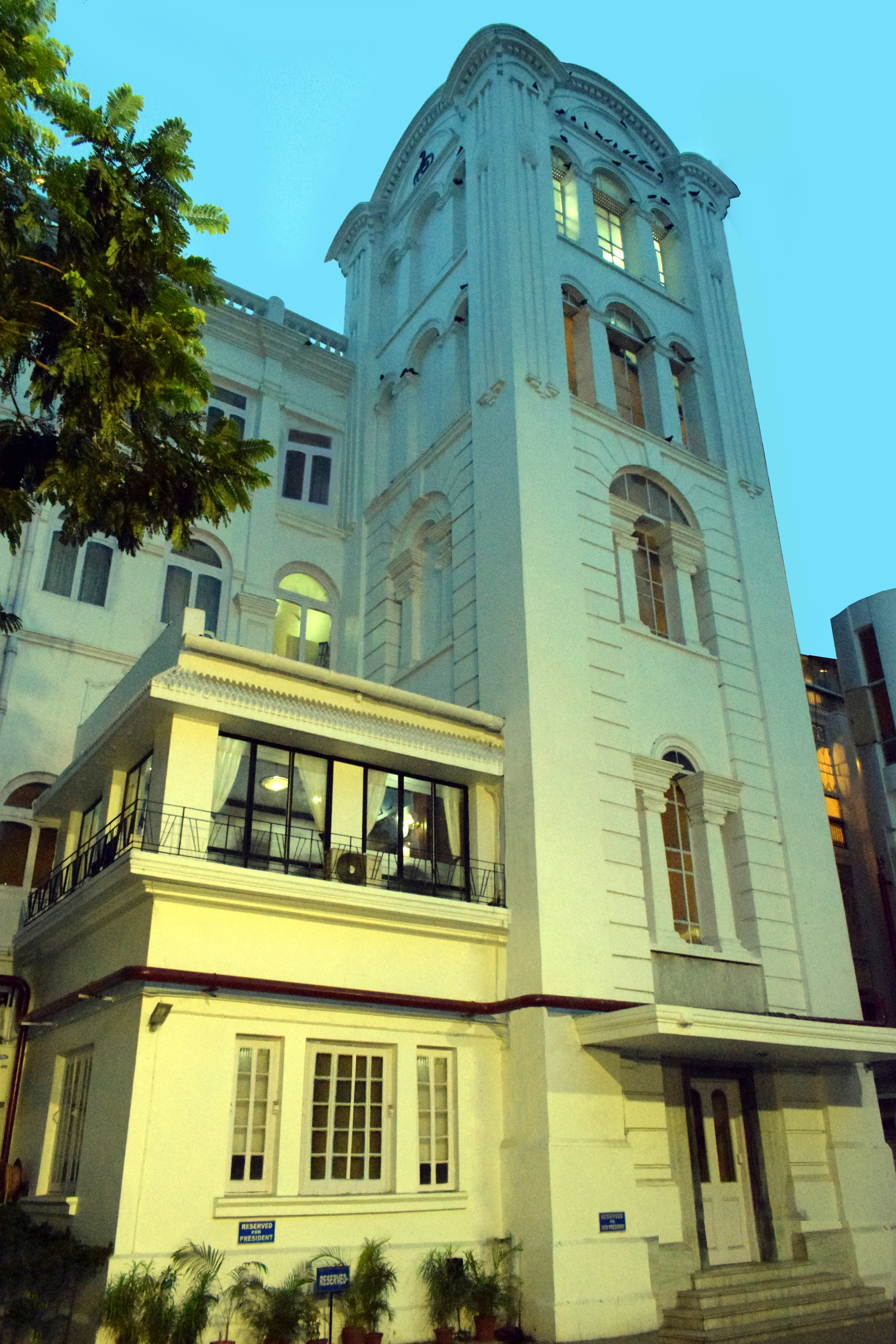
Tower at the club (designed by Esch) with cobra emblem

In 1827, the Bengal Club was housed in a four-storeyed building in Esplanade, known as Gordon's Buildings (now demolished), for a rent of Rupees 800 every month. The "Agency House Crisis" (a major financial crisis of the 1830s, linked to the indigo trade) affected the club severely. Unable to pay rent, the club shifted to a house in Tank Square (later renamed Dalhousie Square). In 1845, with its finances improving, the club shifted to a building in Russell Street, which had served as the residence of Thomas Babington Macaulay. The original owner of the land was Kaliprasanna Singha, a well-known writer and philanthropist. The club later expanded to a new, adjacent building in Chowringhee. The new building was designed by Vincent Esch, superintending architect of the Victoria Memorial, and formally opened in 1911. Esch also dismantled and redesigned the Russell Street building.

In the 1960s, the club ran into heavy debt, as "class and race exclusivity had shrunk the membership". Rather than expanding the club's membership to raise revenues, the club took the decision to maintain its rarefied membership and sell the Chowringhee building to Grindlay's Bank, retaining only the Russell Street premises as before. Macalpine writes that the sale of the Chowringhee building to Grindlay's was "manna from heaven" for the club from a financial standpoint. However, the Indian government unexpectedly refused permission to Grindlay's to use the Chowringhee building. The bank was compelled to sell the building ("reportedly for a song") to Benoy Kumar Chatterjee, a businessman with a controversial reputation.

Chatterjee, in violation of building laws, demolished the Chowringhee building and built a skyscraper in its place, the Chatterjee International Centre. Historian David Gilmour writes that the Chowringhee building could have survived if the club had simply accepted Indians as members after Independence. In Britain, The Times reacted to the demolition by remarking: "The sun has set on the imperial splendour of the Bengal Club." Meanwhile, heritage conservationists have criticised the demolition of the Chowringhee building (described by Ian Jack to be "as grand as the grandest seafront hotel") and called for greater government efforts to preserve architectural heritage.

According to oral legend, a king cobra was spotted by construction workers when the Tank Square premises were being built. The workers, regarding the creature as the sacred guardian of the place, refused to continue their work. A Hindu priest was then brought to the premises to perform rituals and propitiate the snake with milk. The snake eventually left the premises and work resumed. In acknowledgement of the incident, the club adopted the symbol of a king cobra as its emblem in British India. The emblem is visible in a lunette above a tower at the club.

== Notable guests and speakers ==
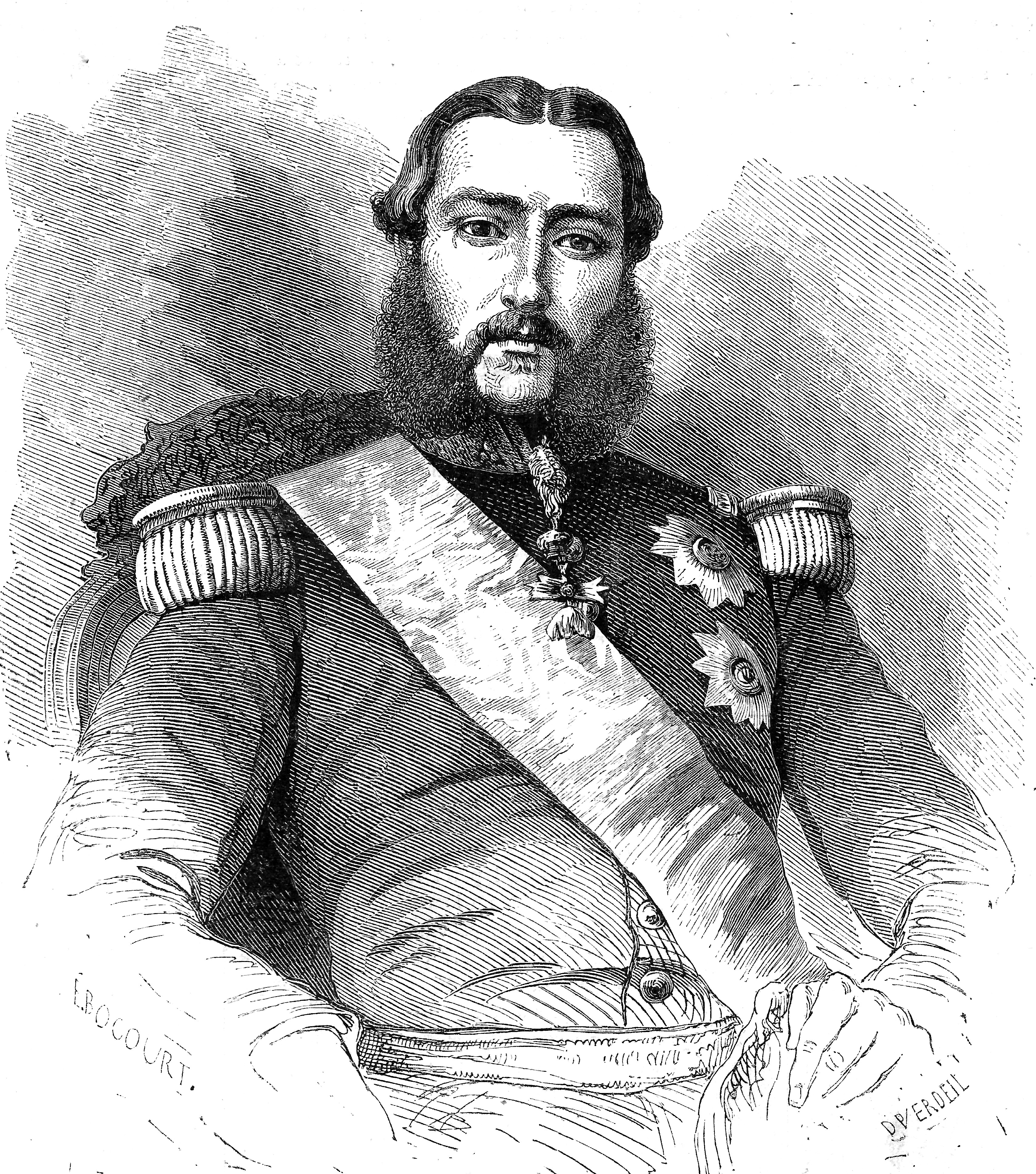
Leopold II

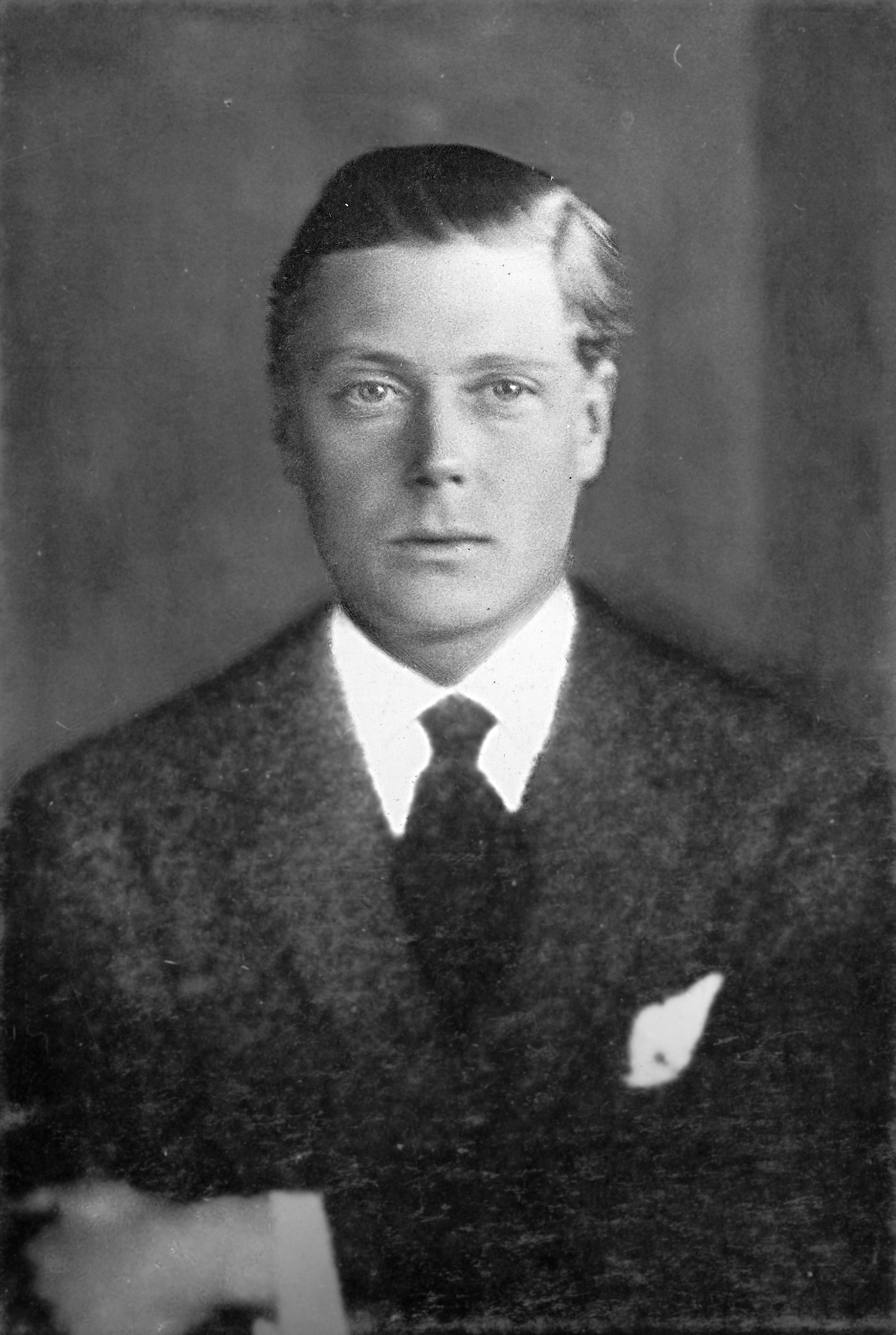
Edward VIII

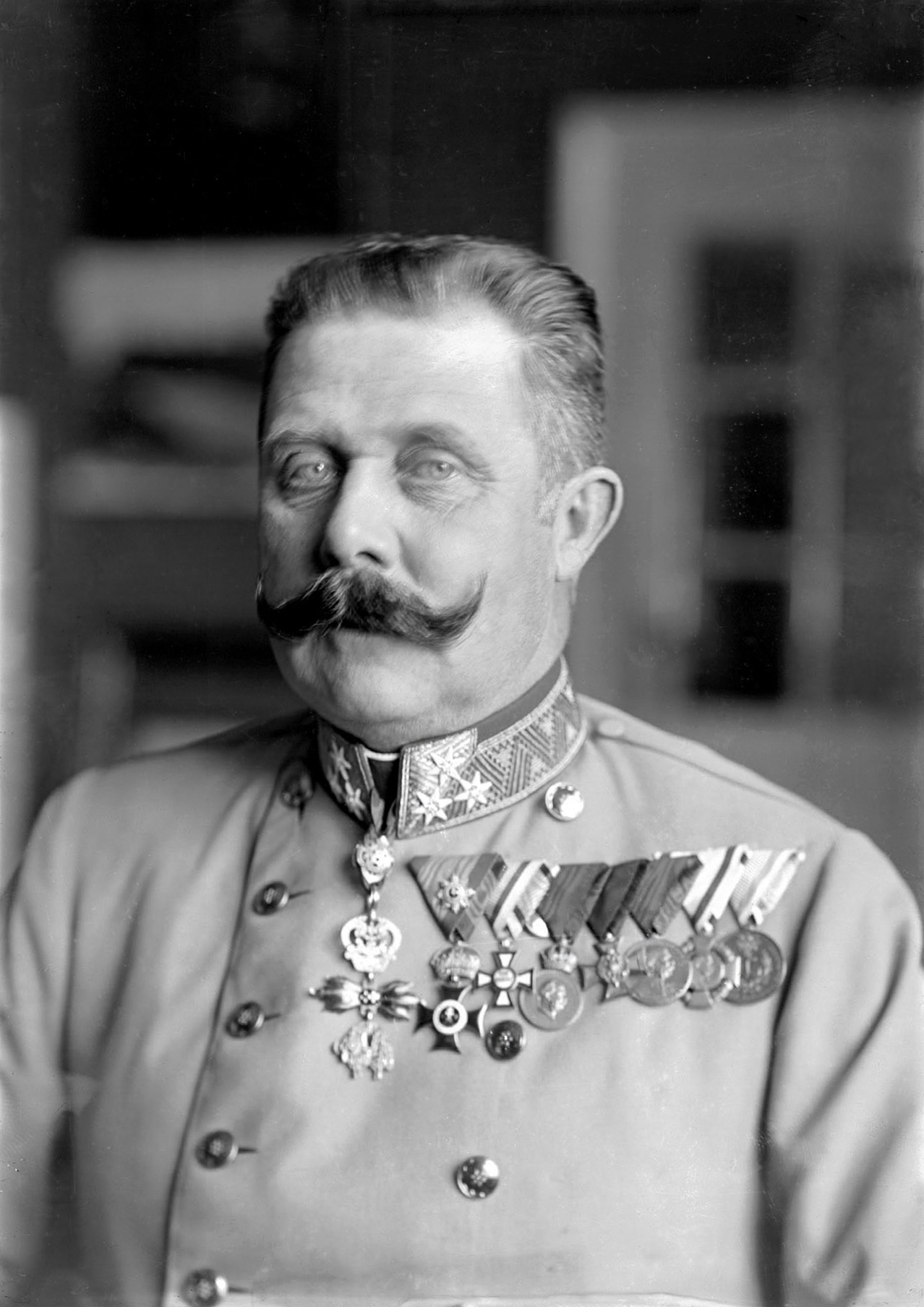
Franz Ferdinand

In British India, many high-ranking royals and politicians had banquets held in their honour at the Bengal Club (customarily hosted by the club's president) and some of them also stayed at the club. Various writings also mention important political meetings taking place at the club. Royal visitors to the club (in both British and independent India) have included Leopold II; Prince Albert Victor; Prince Arthur (twice); Archduke Franz Ferdinand; Grand Duke Boris Vladimirovich; Carol II; Edward VIII; Aga Khan III; Prince Philip (twice); Charles III; Prince Edward; and Prince Andrew.

Political, diplomatic and military visitors have included Steen Andersen Bille; Robert Ogden Tyler; several Governors General of India; Edwin Montagu; Sir Patrick Duncan; Sir John Simon and other members of the Simon Commission, Sir Stanley Jackson; Sir William Slim; C. Rajagopalachari; Jawaharlal Nehru;. V.V. Giri; various British High Commissioners; and a British parliamentary delegation. Other guests have included cricketer Arthur Gilligan (while captaining the Marylebone Cricket Club during a historic tour of India); mountaineers Sir Edmund Hillary, Tenzing Norgay and Sir John Hunt (following the 1953 Mount Everest expedition); and footballer Pelé (who played a match for the New York Cosmos in Kolkata).

In the present century, the Bengal Club has hosted well-known authors and scholars as part of a "Library Talk" series, such as Nobel laureates Amartya Sen, Ben Feringa, Abhijit Banerjee and Esther Duflo; authors Amitav Ghosh and Jeffrey Archer; postcolonial theorist Gayatri Spivak; and economist Kaushik Basu. The club also organises an annual lecture in the memory of Mansoor Ali Khan Pataudi, delivered by a former international cricket captain. Past speakers have included Imran Khan, Brian Lara, David Gower, Greg Chappell, Sir Clive Lloyd, Kapil Dev, Mike Brearley, Courtney Walsh and Sourav Ganguly.

== Members and presidents ==
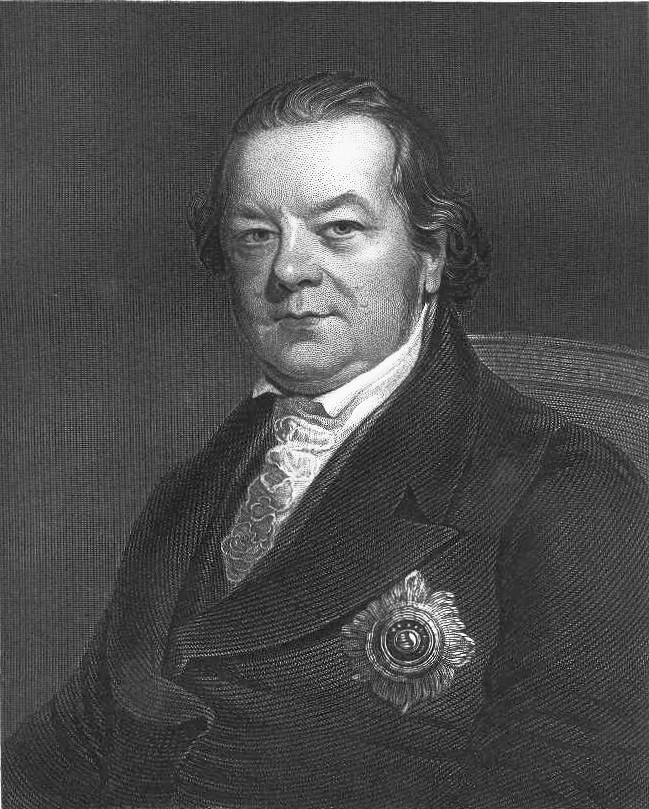
Charles Metcalfe, Bengal Club president from 1827 to 1837

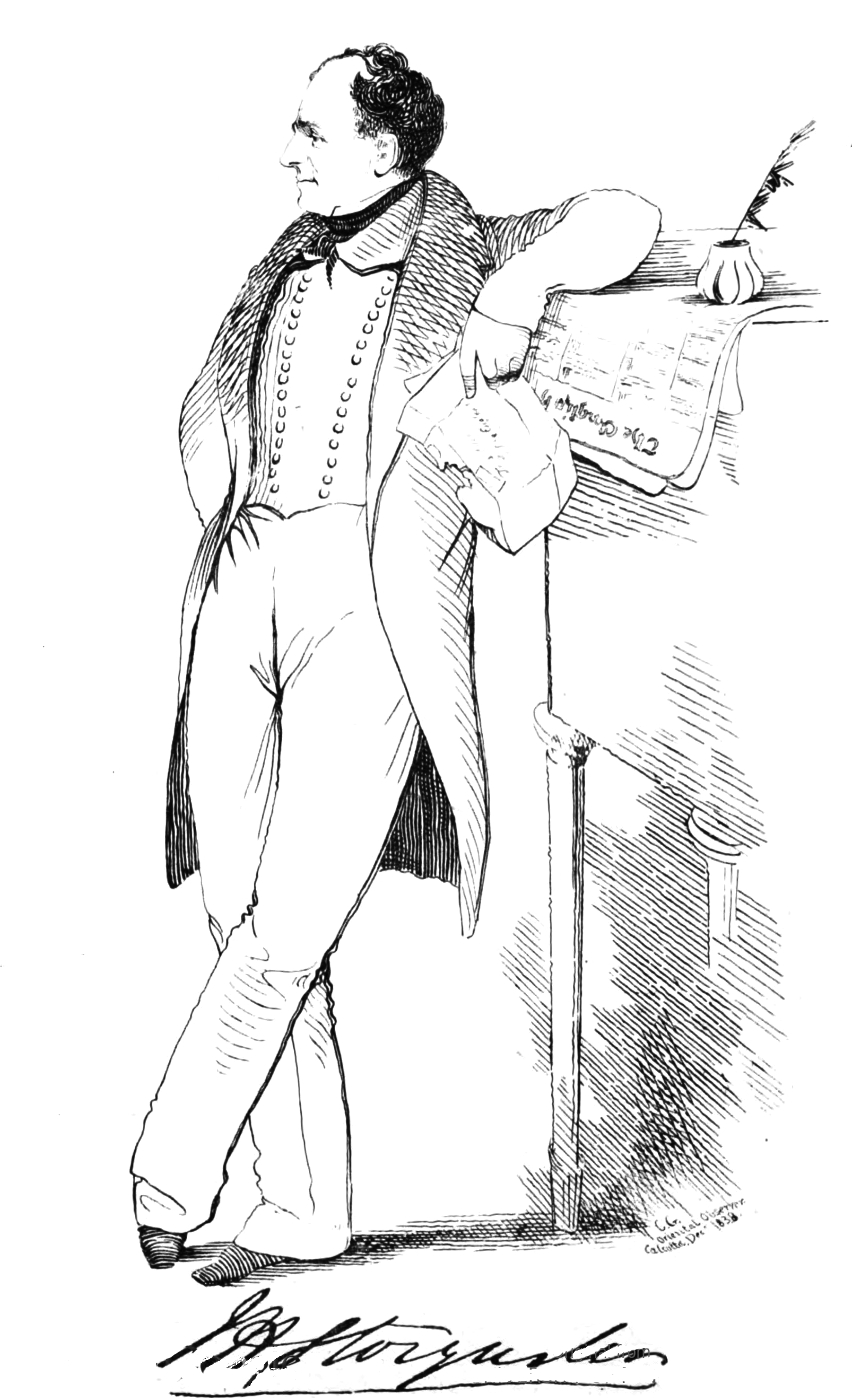
JH Stocqueler was controversially expelled from the club in 1835.

By the 1850s, the Bengal Club's membership remained confined to a few titled noblemen, senior government and military officials, and judges. In the 1880s, the club's membership was, by contrast, described as comprising "chiefly barristers, merchants, and bankers, with a sprinkling of civilian and military men." Notable club presidents in British India included serving or future Governors-General of India and other countries (such as Metcalfe, Lord Ellenborough, Sir John Peter Grant, Sir Henry Bartle Frere and Sir Hugh Lansdown Stephenson); serving or future Chief Justices and Advocates General (such as Sir James William Colville, Sir George Claus Rankin and Sir James Tisdall Woodroffe); senior military officers (such as Sir Willoughby Cotton and Sir James Outram); senior civil servants (such as Sir Clement Hindley); and presidents of the Bengal Chamber of Commerce and Industry (such as Robert Steel, John Johnstone Jardine Keswick and Sir Apcar Alexander Apcar).

During Metcalfe's presidency, the noted editor JH Stocqueler was controversially expelled from the club for writing articles criticising a fellow member (a senior military official). The club subsequently made the following rule: "No editor of a newspaper shall henceforth be eligible for election as a member of this club." During Keswick's presidency, Keswick controversially founded the European and Anglo-Indian Defence Association and campaigned against Lord Ripon's Ilbert Bill at the club. Another member campaigning against the Bill was R.C. Macgregor, who Ripon attacked as "a small Calcutta Barrister...who knows nothing of this country or its affairs except what he picks up in the Bar Library and the Bengal Club."

Dr William Earnest Fetherstonhaugh was the last club president in British India, as well as the first medical doctor to serve as club president. However, many Britons served as club presidents even in postcolonial India, among them Sir Anthony Elkins, Sir Anthony Hayward, Sir Alec Ogilvie and Michael Graham Satow. Bharati Ray writes that the early generation of Indian Bengal Club members "were either educated in the United Kingdom or trained in British corporate ethics." Many were heads of important British corporations of the time. In 1968, Dorab Pestonjee Maneckjee Kanga, a senior corporate executive and member of the Parsi community, became the first Indian president of the club. A number of well-known Parsis subsequently became president, such as CR Irani and Dara Pirojshaw Antia, as did a prominent member of India's Armenian community, Pearson Surita.

In the 1970s, The New York Times described the Bengal Club's membership as including "some of India's most powerful industrialists". In the present century, major Indian business newspapers have similarly described the club's membership as decidedly elite. Like in British India, many modern Bengal Club presidents have served as presidents of the Bengal Chamber of Commerce and Industry, and some have also served as presidents of the Confederation of Indian Industry (CII) and the Associated Chambers of Commerce of India (ASSOCHAM). Outside of the corporate world, a small number of medical practitioners and barristers have served as club president.

== Racial admission policies ==
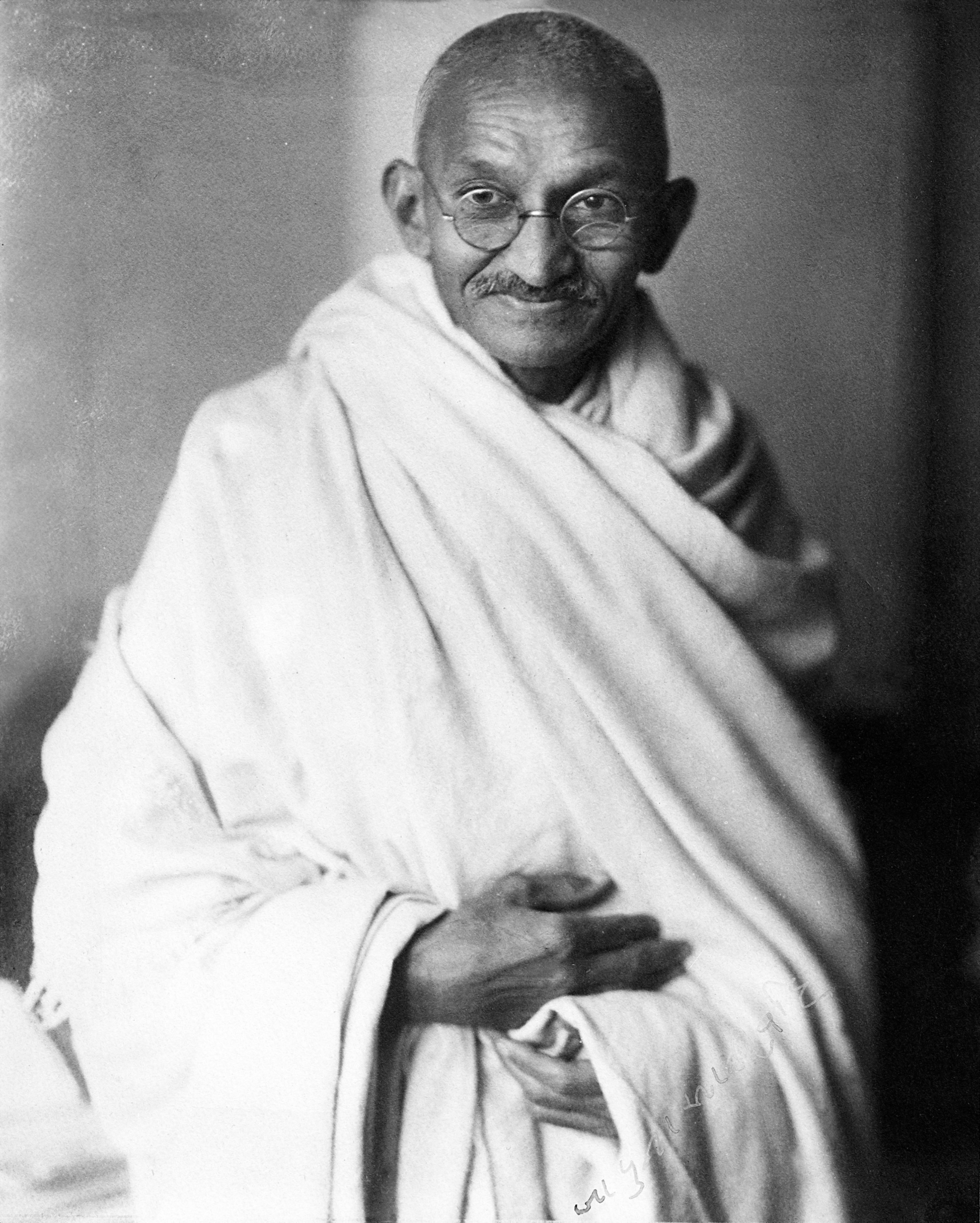
In his autobiography, Gandhi recalled being humiliated at the Bengal Club

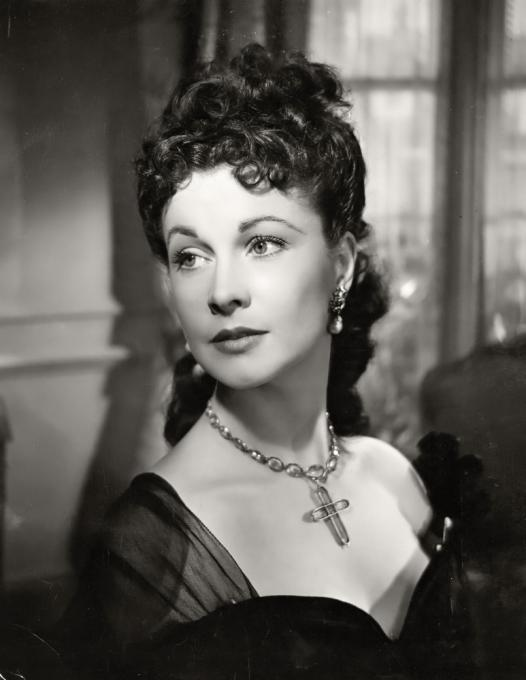
The father of Vivien Leigh allegedly lost his membership of the Bengal Club on racial grounds

In British India, high-ranking Indians had been occasionally entertained at the Bengal Club. In 1910, following the Minto–Morley Reforms, Sir Guy Fleetwood Wilson hosted an important dinner for rulers of princely states appointed to the Imperial Legislative Council. In 1934, Aga Khan III dined at the club as a guest of Sir Edward Benthall, a Member of the Bengal Legislative Assembly and former Governor of the Imperial Bank of India. In the early years of independent India, C. Rajagopalachari and Kailash Nath Katju were hosted for tea by the club, while Jawaharlal Nehru lunched with the club's president and committee members at their invitation. However, several anecdotes suggest that the Bengal Club otherwise practised racial discrimination towards Indians, even in postcolonial India.

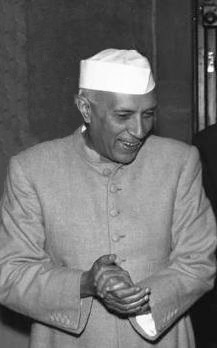
Nehru criticised the Bengal Club's racial bias but later lunched there on invitation

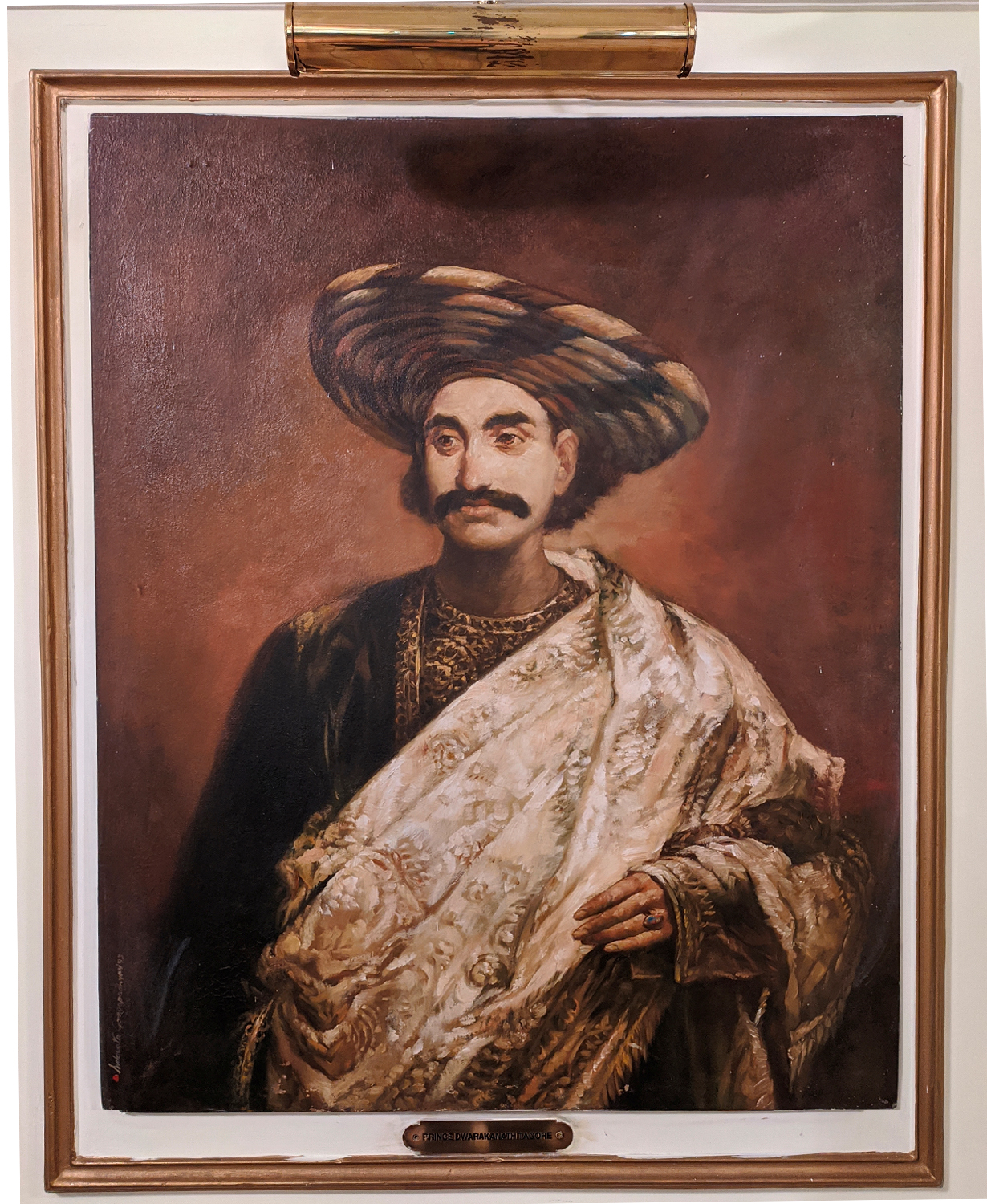
Portrait of Dwarakanath Tagore at the Bengal Club

In the 19th century, highly eminent Indians with ties to the British establishment, such as the industrialist Dwarakanath Tagore, lawyer Prasanna Kumar Tagore and professor of medicine Soorjo Coomar Goodeve Chuckerbutty, were denied membership of the club solely on grounds of their race. In another example, Sir Rajendra Nath Mookerjee had been invited to the club by Lord Minto, but the club erected a tent on the lawn for Mookherjee to dine in, rather than allowing him inside. In 1907, the notable Baghdadi Jew merchant Sir David Ezra was refused membership.

It has also been claimed that Ernest Richard Hartley, a British businessman and father of the actress Vivien Leigh, was effectively expelled from the club after marrying her mother, a woman of Anglo-Indian descent. Another anecdote is one mentioned in the autobiography of Mahatma Gandhi. Gandhi had been invited to the club by John Ellerthorpe, a correspondent of The Daily Telegraph who was staying at the club. On Gandhi's arrival, Ellerthorpe was informed that Indians were not allowed inside the club's drawing-room. He thus took Gandhi to his bedroom at the club instead. Gandhi wrote that Ellerthorpe "expressed his sorrow regarding this prejudice of the local Englishmen" and apologised to him.

Closer to Indian independence, Nehru criticised the Bengal Club, in his book The Discovery of India, for discriminating against Indians while still using the term "Bengal" in its name. Echoing Nehru, the then Governor-General of India, Lord Mountbatten, conveyed that either the club ought to permit Indians or rename itself to the "United Kingdom Club". Yet, the club did not admit Indians as members until 1959.

Macalpine writes that an extraordinary general meeting of the club was held in 1959, where "an overwhelming majority of members voted conclusively" to amend the policy, amidst "pressure from outside". According to The Times, the then government of West Bengal had allegedly threatened to revoke the club's alcohol licence if it did not do so. The report also identified a few other colonial clubs in the city practising racial discrimination. In August 1959, the Home Minister of India, Govind Ballabh Pant, informed Parliament that the Bengal Club had "recently admitted some Indians as members."

== Literary references to the Bengal Club ==
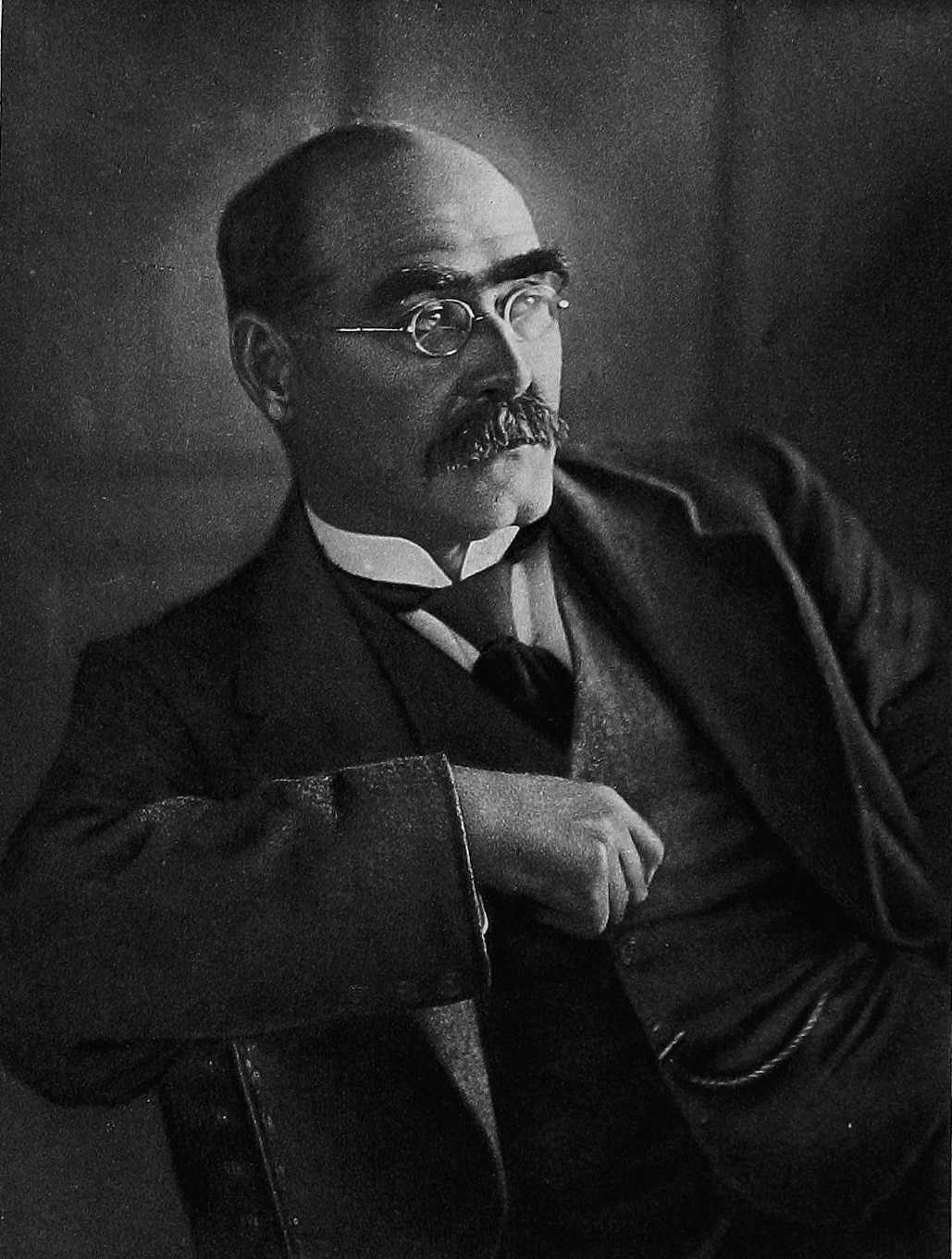
Rudyard Kipling

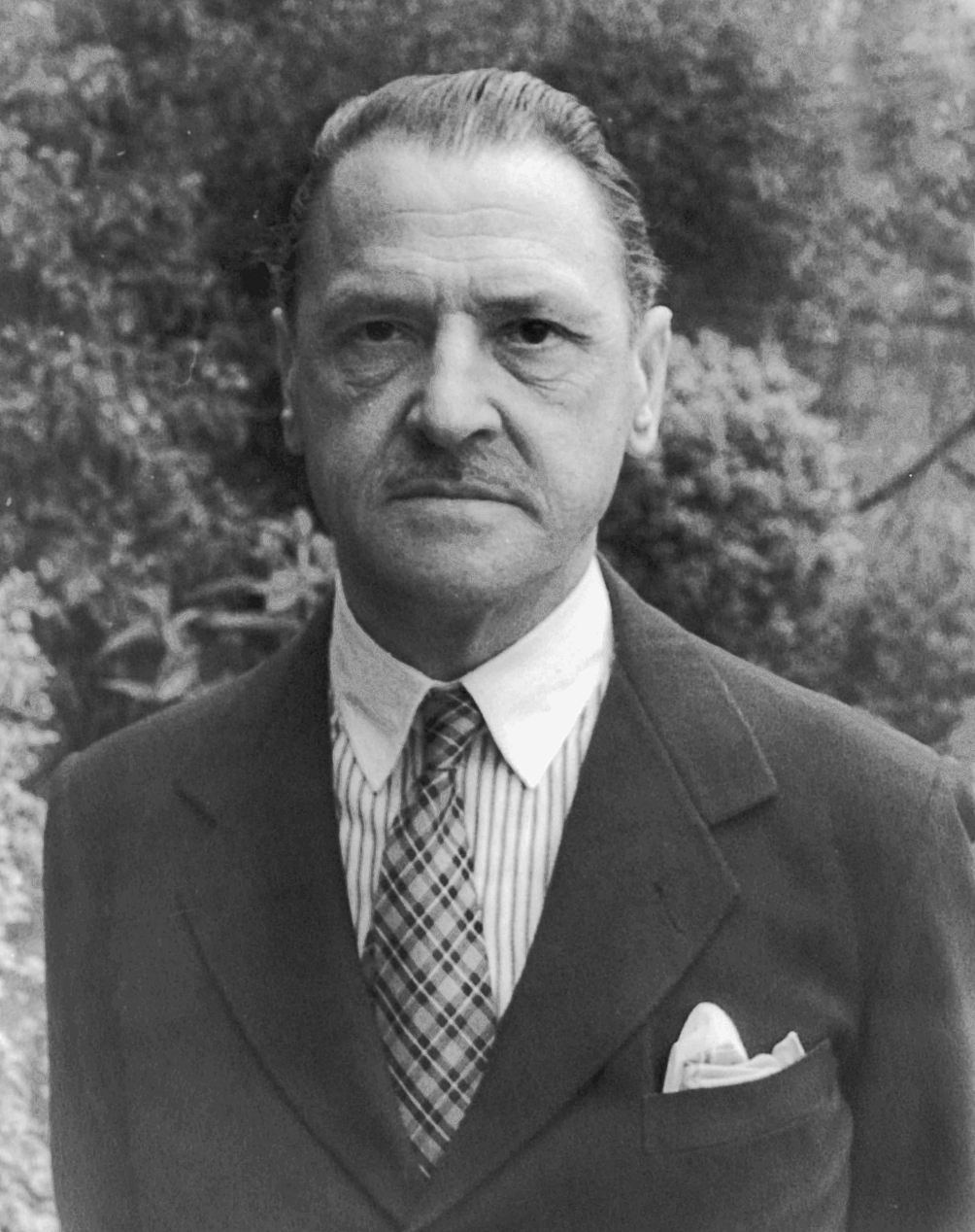
W. Somerset Maugham

The Bengal Club has been mentioned in the works of many well-known authors. Among favourable mentions, Lowell Thomas referred to the club as "one of the best in the world" in a travelogue, while Rumer Godden described the club as serving "the best food east of Suez" in one of her novels. In contrast, W. Somerset Maugham claimed in a memoir that Prince Azam Jah had said to him: "In the Bengal Club at Calcutta they don't allow dogs or Indians". Anita Desai also alluded to the club's racially exclusionary membership, in her novel Voices in the City.

In several novels and short stories, the club has been mentioned in a humorous or ironic way, as a meeting place for eccentric aristocratic gentlemen. Such examples include the Booker-prize winning novel The Siege of Krishnapur by J.G. Farrell, A Division of the Spoils by Paul Scott, A Suitable Boy by Vikram Seth, Sea of Poppies by Amitav Ghosh, and Bribery, Corruption Also by H.R.F. Keating. Similarly, among non-fiction works, Rudyard Kipling caricatured the Bengal Club's patrons in his travelogues. Books like No Full Stops in India by Sir Mark Tully and Calcutta: Two Years in the City by Amit Chaudhuri provide both a more modern and personal description of the club.

In Bengali literature, Satyajit Ray referred to the club in three short stories, The Acharya Murder Case, Ashamanja Babu's Dog and Gagan Chowdhury's Studio.

== Art and antiques collection ==
The Bengal Club has gifted several paintings and artefacts to the Victoria Memorial museum. These include various portraits of Maharajas painted by Valentine Cameron Prinsep (gifted to the museum in 1936). Paintings that remain with the club include several portraits of officials in British India (some painted by George Duncan Beechey). The club also holds a sizeable collection of silverware (including rare sporting trophies from British India) and antique clocks.

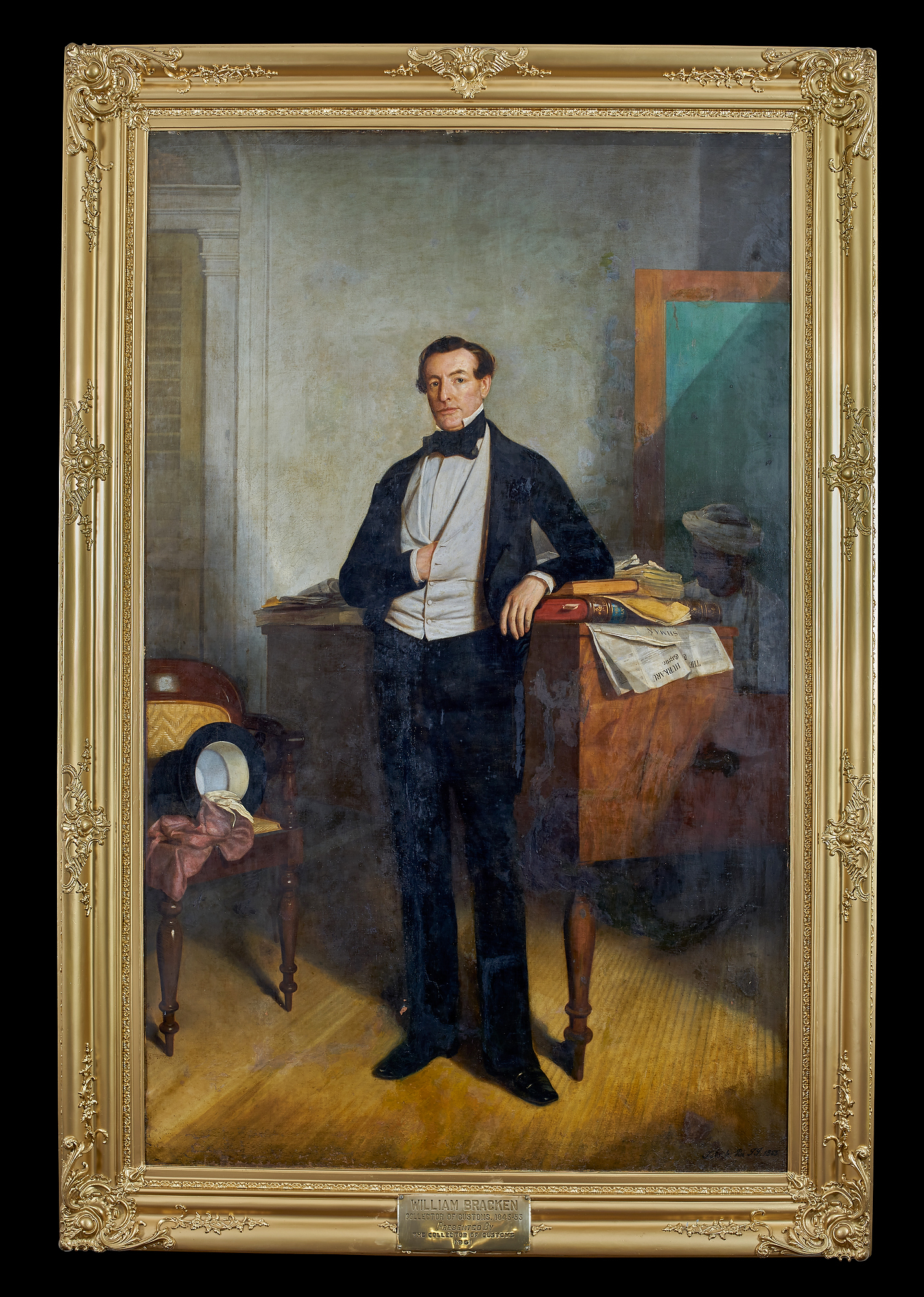
Portrait of William Bracken, Collector of Customs, at the Bengal Club

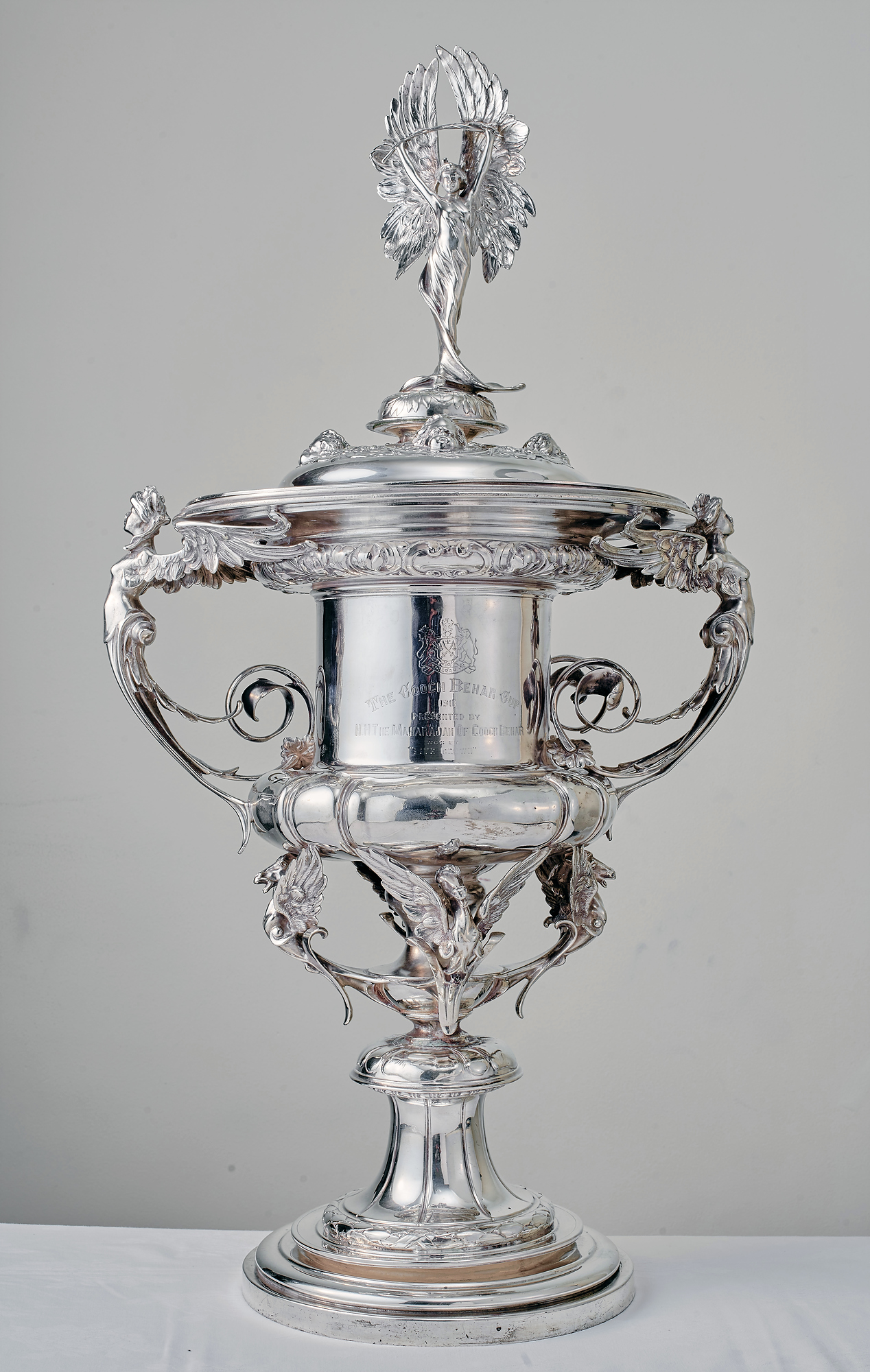
The trophy of Cooch Behar Cup at the Bengal Club, which was one of the oldest football tournaments in Asia.

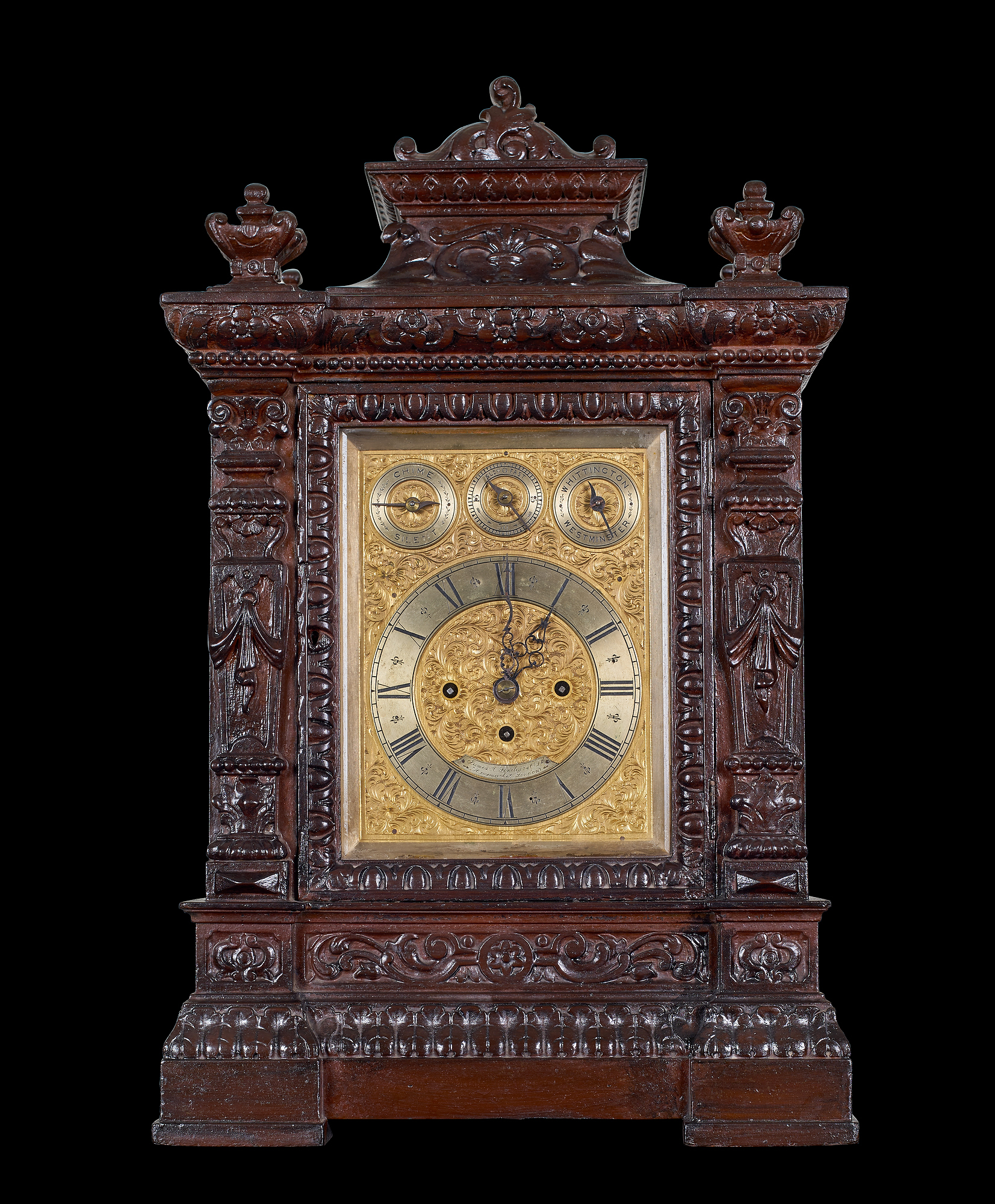
Antique clock at the Bengal Club
