= Anthony Hayward (disambiguation) =

Anthony Hayward (born 1959) is a British journalist and author.

Anthony Hayward may also refer to:

- Anthony W. B. Hayward, British corporate executive and founder of the Haywards 5000 beer brand
- Tony Hayward (born 1957), British businessman
