= Pearson Surita =

Indian cricket commentator (1913–1995)

Personal information
- Full name: Pearson Surita
- Born: May 23, 1912; Calcutta, Bengal Presidency, British India
- Died: March 20, 1995 (aged 82); Kolkata, West Bengal, India
- Batting: Right-handed
- Role: Batsman

Domestic team information
- Years: Team
- 1930s: Bengal

Career statistics
Competition	First-class
Matches	8
Runs scored	320
Batting average	21.33
100s/50s	0/2
Top score	67
Balls bowled
Wickets
Bowling average
5 wickets in innings
10 wickets in match
Best bowling
Catches/stumpings

Pearson Harvey St Regis Surita (1913–1995) was an Indian corporate executive and cricket commentator for All India Radio. Surita hailed from Calcutta (now Kolkata) and was of Armenian descent ("one of the few left in Calcutta after independence"). Several articles mention Surita as one of India's most famous and respected radio cricket commentators, often in nostalgic tones. Henry Blofeld twice called Surita India's "greatest cricket commentator ever". Surita's "big moment" as a cricket commentator is said to have come in 1959, when he was invited as a commentator by the BBC, along with the Maharaja of Vizianagram, during India's tour of England the same year. Surita was also an occasional left-arm spin bowler, having played for Calcutta University and a team representing the Maharaja of Cooch Behar in the 1930s, in a one-off match against a visiting Australian team led by Jack Ryder.

Surita has been especially noted for his accent and diction, variously described as "plummy" (by Simon Winchester), "posh" (by Brian Johnston), and "curiously old-fashioned" with "more than a hint of the British Raj" (by Blofeld). However, his accent was also said to be "the stuff of many a sarcastic jibe". Christopher Martin Jenkins has claimed that Surita "sounded like a Maharajah", while Mukul Kesavan has termed Surita's accent "so posh that you wanted to cry". Even when selected by the BBC in 1959, a senior figure within the organisation expressed reservations over Surita, on the ground that he sounded like "a retired Indian colonel". Mark Tully claims that Surita was eventually barred by All India Radio "because his English was too pukka." However, when Surita was dropped as a commentator during India's tour of England in 1974, the matter was raised in Parliament by Indrajit Gupta, an influential politician from Calcutta who later served as Home Minister of India.

In his corporate career, Surita worked for tea companies McLeod Russell and later Macneill & Magor (both companies now a part of the Williamson Magor group). Surita also served as president of the Calcutta Cricket and Football Club in 1973 and the Bengal Club in 1984. He further served as a steward of the Royal Calcutta Turf Club, which awards the Pearson Surita Memorial Cup in his memory. Surita was educated at St Xavier's Collegiate School and the St Xavier's College in Calcutta. He died a bachelor in Calcutta, at the age of 82.
