= Anthony Elkins =

British corporate executive (1904–1978)

Sir Anthony Joseph Elkins CBE (1904–1978) was a British corporate executive. Educated at Haileybury College, Elkins arrived in India in 1924, at the age of 20. He rose to become chairman of Gillanders Arbuthnot and Co and its successor, the Darjeeling–Himalayan Railway Co, chairman of the Indian Copper Corporation (later nationalised and merged into Hindustan Copper), director of the Imperial Bank of India, president of the Bengal Chamber of Commerce and Industry, president of the Associated Chambers of Commerce (ASSOCHAM), and president of the Bengal Club. In 1950, Prime Minister Jawaharlal Nehru. invited Elkins to serve as the only British advisor to the First Five Year-Plan. Elkins later returned to Britain, serving as vice chairman of the Army & Navy Stores and chairman of Bryant and May and the British Match Co. Elkins received a CBE for his services during the Second World War, where was appointed as Controller of Supplies in Bengal, and was knighted in 1952. He retired to Perth, Australia, in the 1970s.
