= Dara P. Antia =

Dara Pirojshaw Antia (1914-1999), was a metallurgical engineer, researcher and business executive, who founded the Indian Institute of Metals. Antia was born into a Parsi family in Bulsar and was the seventh child in a family of nine children. Antia obtained a bachelor's degree in science from the Banaras Hindu University and a doctorate from the Massachusetts Institute of Technology, and was also an alumnus of the Advanced Management Programme at Harvard Business School. He was named by the Government of India as Director of Metals from 1946-50, during which period he founded the Indian Institute of Metals. Antia also co-founded the Journal of Alloy Phase Diagrams and Journal of Phase Equilibria, and was a recipient of the Henry Marion Howe Medal, awarded by the American Society for Metals, in 1945. Antia later served as deputy managing director of Union Carbide and played an important role in its expansion across India. Antia was also a Ranji Trophy cricketer and a member of the All India Council for Technical Education.

The Indian Institute of Metals has instituted an annual lecture in Antia's memory. President A.P.J. Abdul Kalam, delivering the first lecture in 2006, described Antia as having made an "outstanding contribution to the development of metallurgy in India" and for having "promoted the design, development of many new strategically important alloys".
