= Ilbert Bill =

1883 legislation in British India

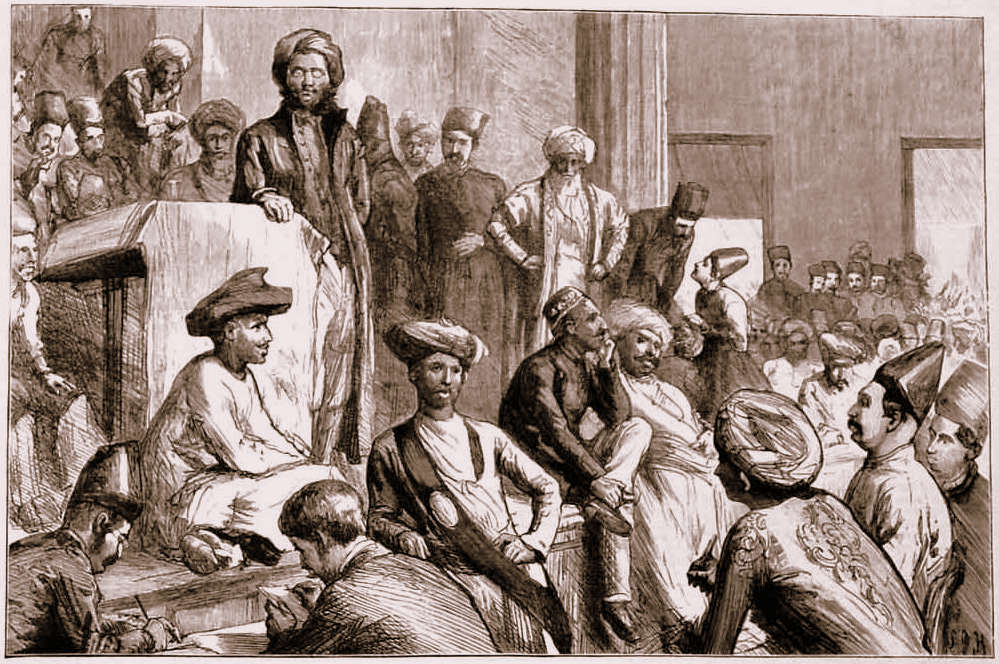
An illustration published in The Graphic on 25 January 1884 depicting a meeting in the Bombay Town Hall in support of the bill

The Ilbert Bill was a bill introduced to the Imperial Legislative Council (ILC) of British India on 9 February 1883 which stipulated that non-white judges could oversee cases that had white plaintiffs or defendants. It was drafted by and named after British civil servant Sir Courtenay Ilbert, then serving as the legal advisor to Council of India, which was head by Governor-General of India Lord Ripon.

Ilbert had originally proposed the bill as part of a revision of the Criminal Procedure Code, which forbade non-white magistrates in British India from trying cases involving white people. The bill, introduced to the ILC by Lord Ripon, was intended to reduce restrictions placed on Indian civil servants by previous British administrations in India. Indian judges who had reached a senior rank within the Imperial Civil Service could try cases involving white plaintiffs or defendants. Lord Ripon's support for the bill was influenced by British Prime Minister William Ewart Gladstone, who instructed him to eliminate some of the more restrictive British legislation aimed at Indian judges.

After it was introduced, the bill sparked a massive controversy, with the European community, including the majority of European women, largely denouncing it and Indian nationalists supporting the bill; the legislation also led to a divided reaction in the United Kingdom. The bill was ultimately enacted in 1884, but in a severely compromised state. Among Indian nationalists, British opposition to the bill led to increased support for the independence movement, with the Indian National Congress being established one year later.

== Background ==
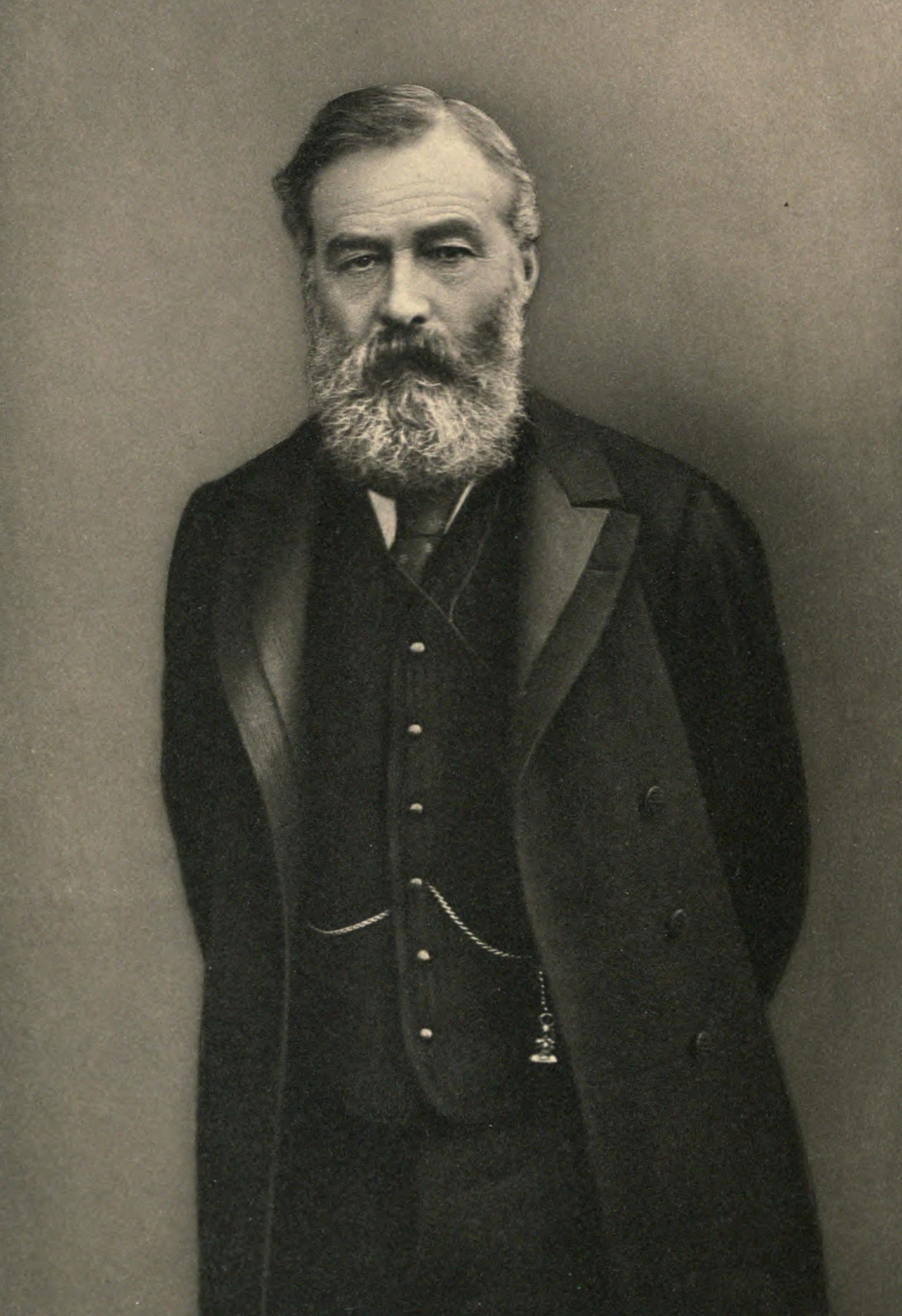
Sir Courtenay Ilbert

British civil servant Sir Courtenay Ilbert, then serving as the legal advisor to Council of India, drafted the "Bill to amend the Code of Criminal Procedure, 1882, so far as it relates to the exercise of jurisdiction over European British subjects", which subsequently became known as the Ilbert Bill. On 2 February 1883 he moved for leave to introduce the bill and it was formally introduced on 9 February 1883. Following the release of this new motion, a massive controversy erupted over divided reactions to the bill in British India.

== Controversy ==
The most vocal opponents of the bill was the European community in India, then called Anglo-Indians, including many tea and indigo plantation owners in the Bengal Presidency. The European and Anglo-Indian Defence Association (which drew much of its membership from Anglo-Indian plantation owners) was formed as a lobbying group to campaign against the bill. Sir Henry Bartle Frere, another vocal opponent, stated that the Ilbert Bill would "raise dangerous race hatred by inculcating the idea that justice which is good enough for natives is good enough for Europeans". The heat of the general protests was at its strongest on 28 February 1883 during a town hall meeting put on by the Bengal Chamber of Calcutta in which several emotional speeches were given. Other demonstrations continued to occur drawing in anywhere from 75,000 to 250,000 protesters. Racial prejudice became much more prevalent through propaganda opposing the bill that declared that Indian judges were unfit and untrustworthy regarding cases involving white people.

Protests, rallies, and discourse on the subject included several racist tropes, such as cartoons of Indian magistrates with animal-like features, and using animal terms such as 'wily snakes' and 'unchangeable, spotted leopards.' Opponents of the bill also feared that as the number of Indian seeking an education was increasing due to British colonial policies, more magistrates would soon become eligible to preside over trials with white plaintiffs or defendants. On the other hand, the majority of Indians strongly supported the bill, and white opposition to it frustrated and infuriated them. The British government in India introduced European systems of education in place in order to create a well-educated Indian upper-class and the bill would have given more authority to Indian judges who were the product of these systems. Yet despite these frustrations, reports show that the Indian supporters of the bill were neither as vocal nor as well organized as the bill’s opponents.

News outlets played a big role in fomenting the dispute around the bill, sparking outrage in Britain and in India, as the political press "actively endeavoured to influence government legislation for India" for the first time. Just three days after the bill was first passed, The Times released an article attacking the changes, which was telegraphed to India and distributed to papers such as The Statesman and The Pioneer. The Gazette, The Times, and other newspapers continued to release statements condemning the bill and criticizing Lord Ripon’s desire to "please the native community at any cost". The widespread news reports invoked more opposition from commentators in Britain.

Another flashpoint was introduced when rumours began circulating that an Anglo-Indian woman had been raped by an Indian man in Calcutta. In reference to the Indian Rebellion of 1857, when it was alleged that white women and girls were raped by Indian rebels, many Anglo-Indians expressed great concern over the perceived humiliation that Anglo-Indian women would have to face when appearing before Indian judges in the case of rape trials. Anglo-Indian newspapers spread wild rumours, including claiming that Indian judges would abuse their power granted to them by the bill to establish harems which they would then fill with white women. The allegations that Indian judges could not be trusted in dealing with cases involving white women aroused considerable Anglo-Indian opposition against the bill. Civil servant John Beames stated that "[it] is intensely distasteful and humiliating to all Europeans... it will tend seriously to impair the prestige of British rule in India... it conceals the elements of revolution which may ere long prove the ruin of the country".

Many Anglo-Indian women who opposed the bill further argued that Bengali women, whom they characterized as "ignorant", were abused by Bengali men, who should therefore not be given the right to judge cases involving white women. Bengali women who supported the bill responded by claiming that they were more educated than female Anglo-Indian opponents of the bill, and pointed out that more Indian women had academic degrees than women in Britain did at the time, due to the fact that the University of Calcutta was one of the first universities to admit female graduates to its degree programmes in 1878, before any British universities had done so. Thousands of Bengali women from organizations in Poona and Bombay also signed petitions in favour of the bill, which they "wholeheartedly supported on humanitarian grounds". Opposition and controversy continued throughout 1883, which forced Lord Ripon to reevaluate and offer a compromise version of the bill.

== Implementation and aftermath ==
At first, as a result of popular disapproval of the Ilbert Bill by a majority of Anglo-Indian women, Lord Ripon (who had introduced the bill) passed an amendment, whereby a jury that had at least half its members be Europeans was required if an Indian judge was to face a European on the dock. Finally, a solution was adopted by way of compromise: jurisdiction to try Europeans would be conferred on European and Indian District Magistrates and Sessions Judges alike. However, a defendant would in all cases have the right to claim trial by a jury of which at least half the members must be European. The bill was then passed on 25 January 1884 as the Criminal Procedure Code Amendment Act 1884, coming into force on 1 May of that year. The controversy and amendment to the Ilbert Bill helped to promote Indian national awareness and a demand for greater Indian autonomy, and the Indian National Congress (INC) was formed a year later.

== See also ==
- Brajendranath De
- Behari Lal Gupta
- Courtenay Ilbert
- Stereotypes of South Asians
