= European and Anglo-Indian Defence Association =

The European and Anglo-Indian Defence Association was a pressure group formed in British India. The group's founder and president was the industrialist John Johnstone Jardine Keswick. The Association has been described as "primarily, the political party of India’s non-official British". The Association was particularly well-known for opposing the Ilbert Bill, and was criticised as a "Defiance" Association. Several tea and Indigo planters were members of the Association.

The Ilbert Bill was formally introduced on 2 February 1883 in the Imperial Legislative Council, during the Viceroyship of the Marquess of Ripon. The Bill was drafted by Sir Courtenay Peregine Ilbert, a member of the Council of the Governor-General of India. The Bill allowed Indian Magistrates or Sessions Judges to try European subjects in British India. In response, the European and Anglo-Indian Defence Association held its first meeting on 29 March 1883, at the Town Hall of Calcutta. The Association claimed to "watch over and protect the interests and promote the welfare of the following classes of persons in India": i) Europeans, ii) Anglo-Indians, iii) European British subjects, iv) Americans, v) Armenians, vi) Eurasians, and vii) "other associated with Europeans by a community of sympathies and interests." The Association divided its goals into political, benevolent and economic goals, thus going beyond thee ambit of the Ilbert Bill. Nevertheless, the Association claimed that its formation was necessitated "by the introduction into the Supreme Legislative Council, without reference to them, of a Bill to deprive them of one of their most cherished rights". At the meeting, Keswick articulated his opposition to the Bill as follows: "when natives have so far advancedthat the wives and sisters, daughters and mothers of those of the ranks from which our native civilians are drawn can come openly into Court and give evidence, and can mix with us and with our wives in society, then there will be so much of each other's innate nature known, that Government may seriously consider about giving natives the power they now ask." In the end, the Association's efforts succeeded in winning British and European subjects the right to trial by a jury of their own countrymen. Sir Hugh Rahere Panckridge, barrister-at-law and later judge of the Calcutta High Court observed some decades later: "No unofficial European has ever enjoyed the unquestioning confidence of his community to the same degree as "King" Keswick."

The Association continued to exist in the early 20th century, after Keswick's death. In 1908, British planters in India solicited the support of the Association to defend their interests. According to Sir Henry Cotton, the Association was campaigning to defend British planters accused of physically assaulting Indian workers, leading to ill-feeling between races. In 1909, the Association objected to the movement of Indian nationalists to boycott British goods. In 1912, the Association renamed itself to the European Association and went on to have prominent Englishmen among its members. However, even after dropping the term "Anglo-Indian" from its name, the Association campaigned in favour of a fixed percentage of Anglo-Indian employees in the railways in India. In 1931, the president of the Association addressed Chatham House and described the Association as "the only official body representing the political opinions of the non-official Europeans in India", and possessing "the official right of access to the Government of India and the Viceroy".
