= Anthony W. B. Hayward =

British corporate executive (1927–2011)

Sir Anthony William Byrd Hayward (1927–2011), also known as Tony Hayward, was a British corporate executive. Hayward is perhaps best remembered for launching the popular Haywards 5000 brand of beer in India.

After serving in the Royal Navy, Hayward arrived in Calcutta (now Kolkata), India, in 1948. He joined the well-known alcohol company Shaw Wallace and rose to become its chairman. Hayward was also appointed president of the Bengal Chamber of Commerce and Industry in 1973, and president of the Associated Chambers of Commerce (ASSOCHAM) in 1977. Hayward is said to have guided Shaw Wallace through "very difficult political, economic and bureaucratic hurdles in the 1970s". The Daily Telegraph in London said of Hayward: "A deep and evident empathy for his host nation made him an outstanding ambassador for British commercial interests at an uneasy time, and his gift with words lightened many a prickly encounter." Hayward left Calcutta

in 1978, moving on to assignments in Singapore and Hong Kong. He was knighted the same year for his services to British business interests in India. Hayward kept making frequent visits to Calcutta and celebrated his fiftieth wedding anniversary there.

In 2016, there was renewed interest in Hayward's life and legacy in the Indian press, after his grandson, Ben Hayward, visited India and produced a four-part documentary series, "2 Men and a Beer", tracing the legacy of the Haywards 5000 brand.
