= Cross (surname) =

Cross is an English topographic surname for someone who lived on a road near a stone cross.

Notable persons with the surname Cross include:

== By given name ==
=== A–C ===
- A.F. Cross (1863–1940), English poet, playwright, journalist and author
- Alan Cross, Canadian radio broadcaster and author
- Alex Cross (footballer) (1919–1998), Scottish footballer
- Alexander Cross (1903–1973), Welsh actor
- Amanda Cross, pen name of Carolyn Gold Heilbrun (1926–2003), American academic and author
- Amos Cross (1860–1888), American baseball player
- Andrew Cross (footballer) (born 1961), Australian rules footballer
- Anne Haney Cross (born 1956), American neurologist and neuroimmunologist
- Anthony Glenn Cross (born 1936), English slavist
- Anthony John Cross (born 1945), English cricketer
- Art Cross (1918–2005), American race car driver
- Arthur Henry Cross (1884–1965), English recipient of the Victoria Cross
- Ben Cross (1947–2020), English actor
- Ben Cross (rugby league) (born 1978), Australian rugby league footballer
- Benny Cross (1898–1986), English footballer
- Bernice Cross (1912–1996), American artist
- Billy Cross (born 1946), American musician
- Billy Cross (American football) (1929–2013), American football player
- Burton M. Cross (1902–1998), American politician
- Charles Cross (disambiguation), multiple people
- Chris Cross (1952–2024), English musician
- Christopher Cross (born 1951), American musician
- Cory Cross (born 1971), Canadian ice hockey player

=== D–F ===
- Daniel Cross (filmmaker), Canadian documentary filmmaker and producer
- Daniel Cross (footballer) (born 1983), Australian rules footballer
- David Cross (born 1964), American actor and comedian
- David Cross (artist), British artist
- David Cross (footballer born 1950), English footballer
- David Cross (footballer born 1982), English footballer
- David Cross (musician) (born 1949), English musician
- Dennis Cross (1924–1991), American film and television actor
- Dolores Cross (born 1938), American educator and university administrator
- Donna Cross, Australian academic and psychology researcher
- Donna Woolfolk Cross (born 1947), American writer
- Dorothy Cross (born 1956), British artist
- Douglas Cross (1892–1970), Australian politician
- Edith Cross (1907–1983), American tennis player
- Edward Cross (politician) (1798–1887), American politician
- Edward E. Cross (1832–1863), American Army General
- Eliska Cross (born 1986), French actress
- Emily Cross (born 1986), American fencer
- Frank Cross (baseball) (1873–1932), American baseball player
- Frank Leslie Cross (1900–1968), English theologian
- Frank Moore Cross (1921–2012), American scholar

=== G–I ===
- Garvin Cross (born 1970), stuntman and actor
- George Lynn Cross (1905–1998), American educator
- Gillian Cross (born 1945), English author
- Graham Cross (born 1943), English-born footballer
- H. Morrey Cross (1921–2008), served as the International Commissioner of Scouts Canada
- Hardy Cross (1885–1959), American engineer
- Harriet Cross, British politician
- Harriet Cross (diplomat), British diplomat
- Helen Cross (author) (born 1967), English author
- Helen Cross (politician) (died 2022), Australian politician
- Henri-Edmond Cross (1856–1910), French pointillist painter
- Howard Cross (born 1967), American football player
- Howard Cross III (born 2001), American football player
- Hugh Cross (1925–1989), British actor
- Hugh W. Cross (1896–1972), American politician
- Ian Cross (rugby league) (born 1989), Irish rugby footballer
- Irv Cross (1939–2021), American football player and commentator

=== J–N ===
- James Cross (1921–2021), British former diplomat in Canada who was kidnapped by militants in 1970
- James Albert Cross (1876–1952), lawyer and political figure in Saskatchewan, Canada
- James B. Cross (1819–1876), American lawyer and politician
- James U. Cross (1925–2015), retired United States Air Force brigadier general and author
- Jane T. H. Cross (1817–1870), American author
- Ja'Quez Cross (born 2002), American football player
- Jason Cross (born 1979), American professional wrestler
- Jeff Cross (basketball) (born 1961), American basketball player
- Joan Cross (1900–1993), English singer
- John Keir Cross (1914–1967), Scottish writer
- John Kynaston Cross (1832–1887), British cotton spinner and Liberal Party Member of Parliament for Bolton
- Jonathan Cross (footballer) (born 1975), English footballer
- Joseph Cross (actor) (born 1986), American actor
- Karen Cross (born 1974), English tennis player
- Kate Cross (born 1991), English cricketer
- Kendall Cross (wrestler) (born 1968), American wrestler
- Kenna Cross, American politician from New Hampshire
- Kenneth Cross (1911–2003), Royal Air Force commander
- Kyra Cooney-Cross (born 2002), Australian footballer
- Lave Cross (1866–1927), American baseball player
- Lloyd Cross, American physicist and holographer
- Malcolm Cross (1856–1919), Scottish rugby footballer
- Manfred Cross (1929–2024), Australian politician
- Marcia Cross (born 1962), American actress
- Mark Cross (disambiguation)
- Martin Cross (born 1957), British oarsman
- Merv Cross (1941–2023), Australian doctor and former rugby league footballer
- Mike Cross (disambiguation)
- Milton Cross (1897–1975), American radio announcer, opera expert
- Monte Cross (1869–1934), American baseball player
- Neil Cross (born 1969), British novelist and scriptwriter
- Niki Cross (born 1985), American footballer
- Nick Cross (disambiguation), multiple people
- Nicky Cross (born 1961), English footballer

=== O–R ===
- Paul Cross (disambiguation)
- Peter Cross (disambiguation)
- Philip Cross (1826–1888), Irish murderer
- R. A. Cross, 1st Viscount Cross (1823–1914), British statesman and Conservative politician
- Randy Cross (born 1954), American football analyst and former NFL lineman
- Richard Cross (disambiguation)
- Rob Cross (basketball), basketball coach
- Rob Cross (born 1990), English darts player
- Robert Thomas Cross (1850–1923), English astrologer
- Roger Cross (born 1969), Canadian actor
- Sir Ronald Cross, 1st Baronet (1896–1968), English politician and diplomat
- Ronald Anthony Cross (1937–2006), American author
- Roy Cross (footballer) (born 1947), English footballer
- Rupert Cross (1912–1980), English jurist
- Ryan Cross (born 1979), Australian rugby footballer

=== S–Z ===
- Shirley Gale Cross (1915–2008), American botanist, botanical illustrator, and conservationist
- Stan Cross (1888–1977), Australian strip and political cartoonist
- Steve Cross (footballer) (born 1959), English footballer
- Tara Cross-Battle (born 1968), American volleyball player
- Terry M. Cross (born 1947), American Coast Guard Admiral 2004–2006
- Tim Cross (born 1951), retired British Army officer
- Tom Cross (politician) (born 1958), American politician
- Tom Cross (rugby) (1876–1930), New Zealand rugby footballer
- Tom Peete Cross (1897–1951), American Celticist and folklorist
- Tracy L. Cross (born 1958), American psychologist and academic
- Travis Cross (born 1980), Canadian wrestler
- Ulric Cross (1917–2013), Trinidadian lawyer, diplomat and RAF navigator
- Veronica Ann Cross (born 1950), English beauty queen
- Wilbur Cross (1918–2019), American author
- Wilbur Lucius Cross (1862–1948), American educator and politician
- William Cross (disambiguation)
- Zora Cross (1890–1964), Australian poet

== Characters ==
- Aaron Cross, the main protagonist of the 2012 film The Bourne Legacy
- Alex Cross, a fictional character and the protagonist in the James Patterson Alex Cross series of novels
- Angela Cross, a fictional character from 2003 video game Ratchet & Clank: Going Commando
- Augustine Cross, a fictional character in Marvel Comics
- Carland Cross, a fictional character and the protagonist of the Carland Cross TV series and novels
- Cora Cross, a fictional character in the BBC soap opera EastEnders
- Darren Cross, a Marvel Comics supervillain
- Edna Cross, a fictional character from the Channel 4 soap opera Brookside
- Gina Cross, a fictional character in the Half-Life video game series
- Harry Cross, a fictional character from the Channel 4 soap opera Brookside
- Jack Cross, a fictional character from the comic book series of the same name
- James Cross, a fictional character in the TV series Callan
- Joe Cross, a fictional character in the 2025 film Eddington
- Kaleb Cross, the real name of the playable character Revenant in Apex Legends
- Noah Cross, a fictional character and villain in the 1974 film Chinatown
- Professor Cross, a fictional character and villain in the 2019 comic series Chrononauts: Futureshock
- Rainie Cross, a fictional character in the BBC soap opera EastEnders
- Robert Cross, a fictional character and villain in the 2009 video game Prototype
- Sergeant Cross, a fictional character featured in the Need for Speed: Most Wanted and Need for Speed: Carbon video games

== Related surnames ==
- Crouch
- Croucher

== See also ==
- Crosse – alternate spelling
