= Crouch (surname) =

Crouch is a family name. It is an Anglo-Saxon name and derives from someone who lived by a cross.

== People with the family name Crouch ==
- Amelia Crouch (born 2004), British actress
- Andraé Crouch (1942–2015), American gospel musician
- Anna Maria Crouch (1763–1805), English actress and mistress of George, Prince of Wales
- Bertha Crouch Chase (1874–1957), American athlete
- Bill Crouch (1910s pitcher)
- Bill Crouch (1940s pitcher)
- Blake Crouch (born 1978), American author
- Colin Crouch, British professor of sociology
- David Crouch (disambiguation), multiple people
- Dennis Crouch (born 1975), American legal academic best known as author of patent law blog Patently-O
- Dennis Crouch (bassist) (born 1967), American upright bassist
- Eliza Emma Crouch (1836–1886), birth name of English courtesan Cora Pearl
- Eric Crouch, American football player
- Frederick Crouch, English composer and cellist
- Gabriel Crouch, English baritone and former member of King's Singers
- Hubert B. Crouch (1906–1980), American zoologist
- Jack Crouch (disambiguation), multiple people
- Jan Crouch, wife of Paul Crouch, and co-founder of Trinity Broadcasting Network
- Jared Crouch, Australian rules football player
- John Crouch (disambiguation), multiple people
- Joseph Crouch (1934–1989), American politician from Virginia
- Joyce Crouch (1935–2018), American politician from Virginia
- Leonard C. Crouch (1866–1953), New York judge
- Lionel Crouch (1886–1916), British solicitor
- Matt Crouch, American Christian broadcaster
- Nigel Crouch (born 1958), English footballer
- Paul Crouch, (1934–2013) founder of the largest Christian Television Network, Trinity Broadcasting Network
- Paul Crouch Jr. (born 1959), American Christian broadcaster
- Peter Crouch (born 1981), English footballer
- Robert Crouch (1904–1957) British Member of Parliament
- Roger K. Crouch, US payload specialist, with considerable space flight experience
- Sandra Crouch (1942–2024), American gospel music performer, drummer and songwriter
- Stanley Crouch (1945–2020), American music critic
- Suzanne Crouch, representative in the Indiana House of Representatives
- Tracey Crouch, British Conservative Member of Parliament

=== Fictional ===
- Barty Crouch Senior, fictional character in the Harry Potter series by J. K. Rowling
- Barty Crouch Jr., fictional character in the Harry Potter series by J. K. Rowling

== See also ==
- Cross (surname)
- Croucher
