= Anthony Cross =

Anthony Cross may refer to:

- Anthony Cross (cricketer) (born 1945), English cricketer
- Anthony Cross (literary scholar) (born 1936), British historian of Russia

== See also ==
- Anthony Crosse, Irish hurler
