= Crouch =

Crouch may refer to:

== Places ==
- Crouch Island, Antarctica
- Crouch, Swale, a hamlet within Boughton under Blean, Kent, England
- Crouch, Tonbridge and Malling, near Sevenoaks, Kent, England
- River Crouch, Essex, England
- Crouch, Idaho, United States
- Crouch, Virginia, United States

== Other uses ==
- Crouch (surname)
- Crouch Cars, former British car maker

== See also ==
- Al-Jathiya
- Burnham-on-Crouch, Essex, England
- Crouch End, North London, England
- Crouch Hill, North London, England
- Krouch (disambiguation)
- Squatting position
