= Allegory of Marriage =

c. 1530–1535 painting by Titian

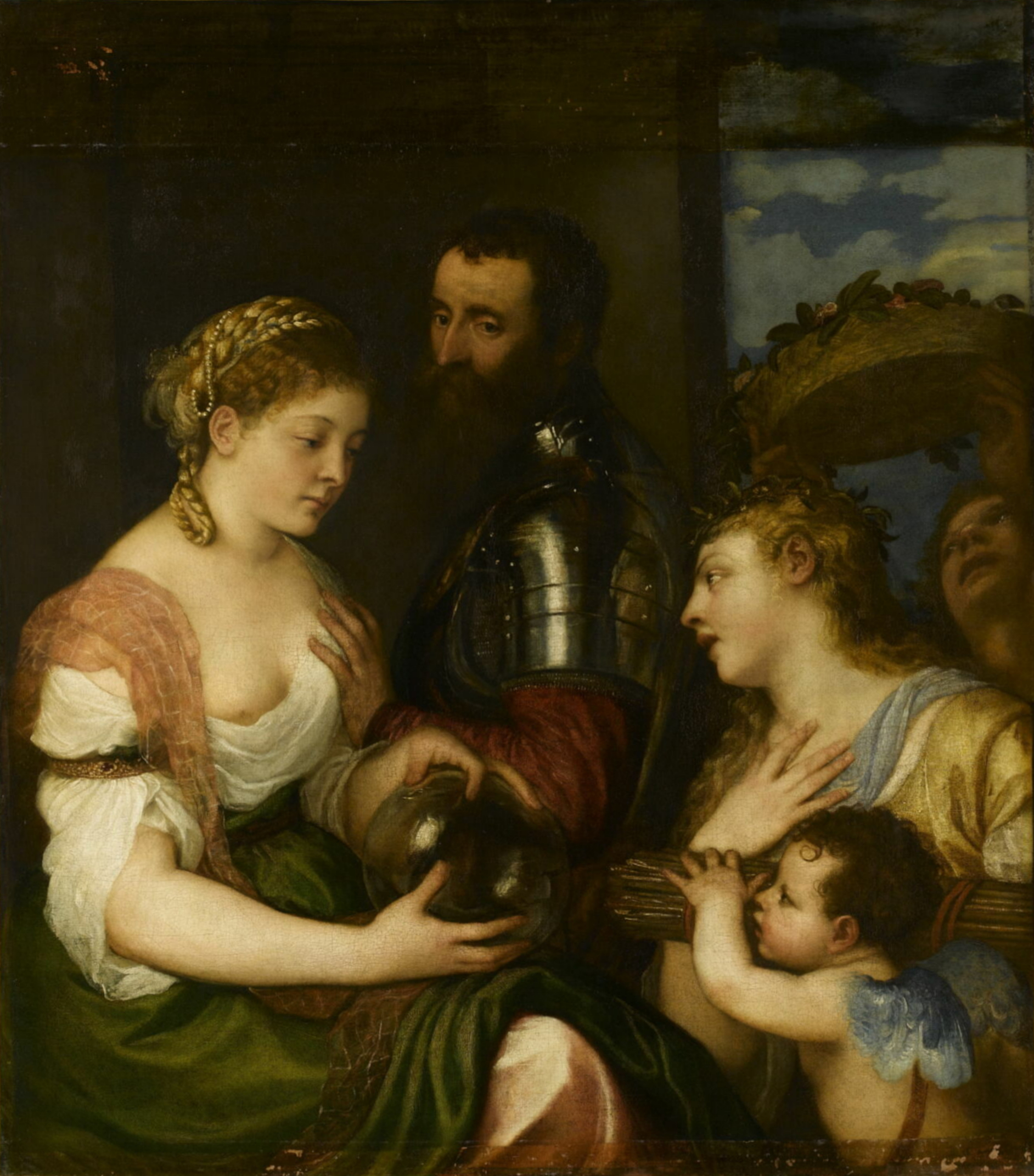
- Artist: Titian
- Year: c. 1530–1535
- Medium: Oil on canvas
- Dimensions: 123 cm × 107 cm (48 in × 42 in)
- Location: Louvre; Paris
- Accession: INV 754; MR 506

The Allegory of Marriage (French: Allégorie Conjugale), also titled the Allegory of Separation (Allégorie de la séparation), and formerly known as the Allegory of Alfonso d'Avalos (Allégorie d'Alphonse d'Avalos), is an oil painting by Titian, made about 1530 to 1535, in the collection of the Louvre. There are several fairly early copies, done after Titian, including two in the Royal Collection.

== Description ==
A well-dressed lady and a gentleman in armor appear on the left of the painting. They, especially the lady, are attended by a young woman and some children. The light colours of the lady's dress, a combination of red, green and yellow, enclose her shapely form; beside this mass of strong light the figure of the gentleman in his polished metal breastplate and spaulder stands out dark; turning to the lady, but gazing out of the picture, he lays his hand on her breast.

With them are associated some allegorical figures—a child who represents the God of Love carrying his bow and arrows; a woman with a wreath round her hair, who lays a hand on her breast with a deprecating gesture; and farther to the back, seen strongly foreshortened, the head of a youth, who is holding up a basket laden with flowers. While brightness pervades the foreground, calls out broad lights on the crystal ball and the spaulder, this last figure remains in a rich half-shadow, the head broadly set against a deep blue sky.

== Analysis ==
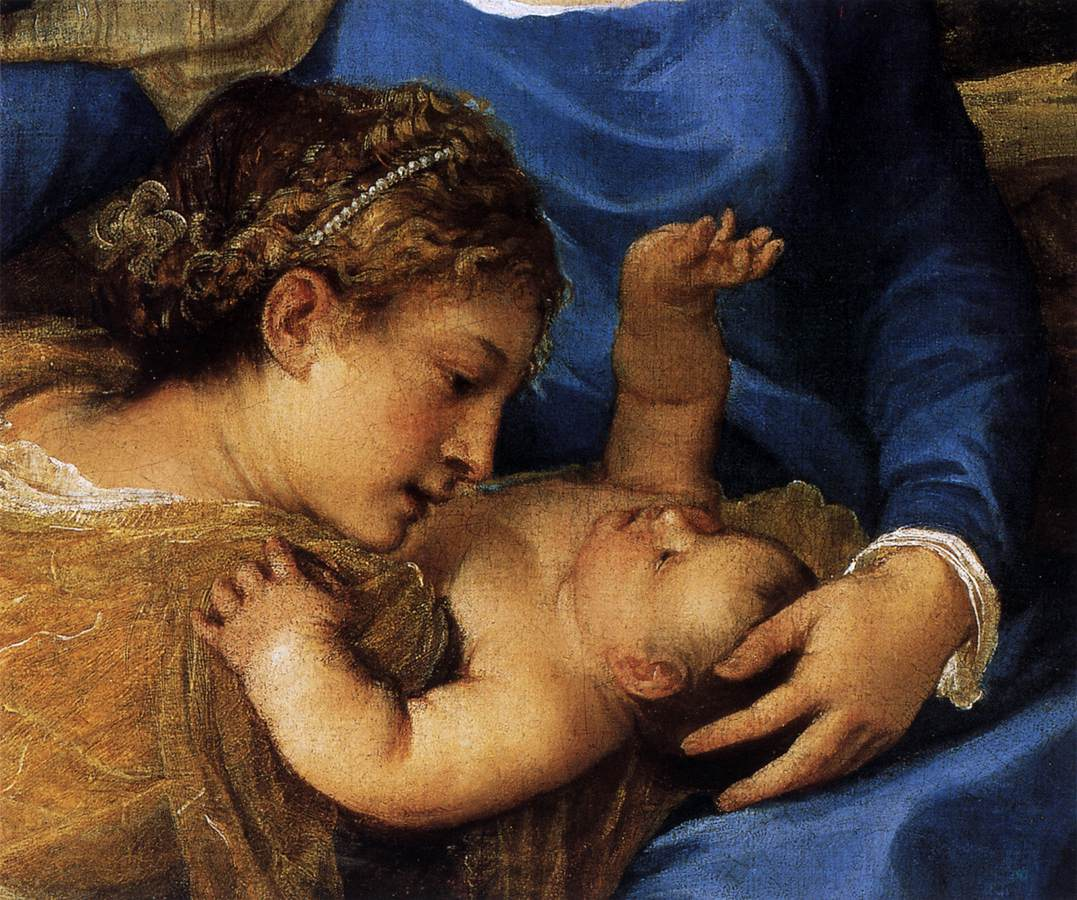
Gronau thinks St. Catherine in this Madonna may be the same model.

Georg Gronau fancies the Saint Catherine of the London Madonna is the same female figure which is the central object of this picture. He notes the same "roundness of form", the same profile, and the same "golden hair with its rich plaits entwined with strings of pearls". He also mentions the Girl in a Fur as a point of comparison.

The group was once supposed to represent the parting of Alfonso d'Avalos, Marquis of Vasto, from his young wife, Mary of Aragon, when he was about to set out for war against the Turks. Amor himself, the Goddess of Victory, and Hymen console the grieving lady, who gazes meditatively into a crystal ball she holds in her hand, the symbol of the transient nature of all things human. Relations between this nephew and heir of the Marquis of Pescara and Titian are known to have existed. On 2 November 1531, he wrote to Aretino: "We want to have Titian here, in Correggio; and if you can do anything to further his coming, I shall be very glad." But whether this letter is connected with the picture is rather doubtful, in Gronau's view, as the features of the man in armour of the Allegory are not those of the Marquis del Vasto.

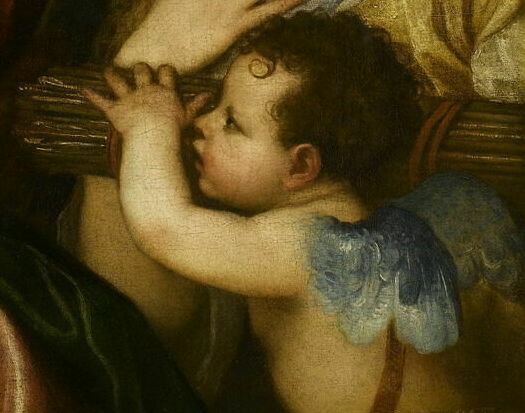
Ricketts sees "some exquisite painting" in the Cupid.

Charles Ricketts imagines that the woman who holds a crystal may represent Wisdom or Prudence, and the attendant figures with flowers and wreaths and darts may be the pleasures upon which the armoured warrior turns his back. "Some trite allegory", he writes, "is more likely to be at the root of this 'poesie' than the theory advanced by Crowe and Cavalcaselle that the crystal-gazer is a pensive wife."

== Date ==
About the traditional name there is certainly some mistake, but the subject remains obscure. It was probably painted about 1530 to 1535, at the same period as the Madonna of the Rabbit, the Madonna with Saint Catherine (Aldobrandini Madonna) in London, and the Presentation of the Virgin.

== Provenance ==
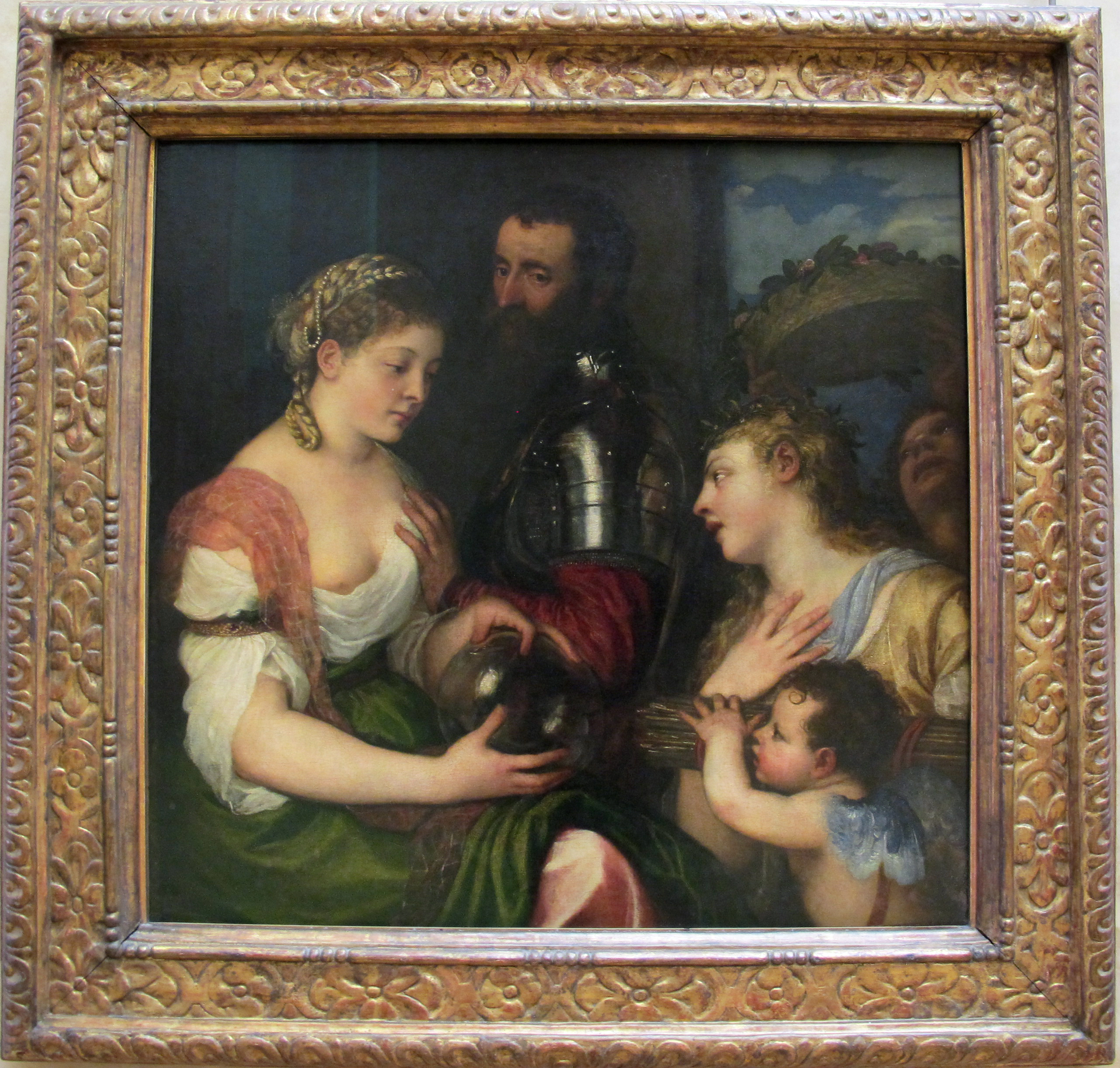
The painting on display in the Louvre in its current frame.

The picture was in the collection of Charles I of England at Whitehall, having been acquired at a public sale in Spain, and was copied by Peter Oliver in 1629 and listed in an inventory of 1639. It was sold in London in 1650, without attribution, as The family of ye Marquess of Guasto. It was owned by Colonel J. Hutchinson of London and Everhard Jabach of Paris, engraved around 1660, and cited in 1661. It was acquired from Jabach by Louis XIV of France in 1662, and is mentioned in an inventory of 1683 (no. 54). The various replicas in existence, differing as to detail, show that this composition must have been famous. Two early copies in the British Royal Collection may have been painted for Charles I directly from the Titian by Michael Cross (Miguel de la Cruz), a copyist employed by the King in Spain.

== Influence ==
It has been suggested that the general composition of The Beloved, a painting of 1865–66 by the English Pre-Raphaelite painter Dante Gabriel Rossetti (1828–1882), now in Tate Britain, was influenced by the Titian. The Rossetti shows a group of six figures in a similar circular arrangement.

== Conservation ==
According to Ricketts, the Allegory in the Louvre was by 1910 in a "shocking state of partial damage by abrading and retouching, and by centuries of dirt". The two ladies, as is often the case with popular pictures, have in his view been "terribly retouched", and some damage has happened to the exposed bosom of the woman who holds the crystal, some abrasure of the pigment, due possibly to the removal of an added drapery which at one time may have covered it.

== Gallery ==
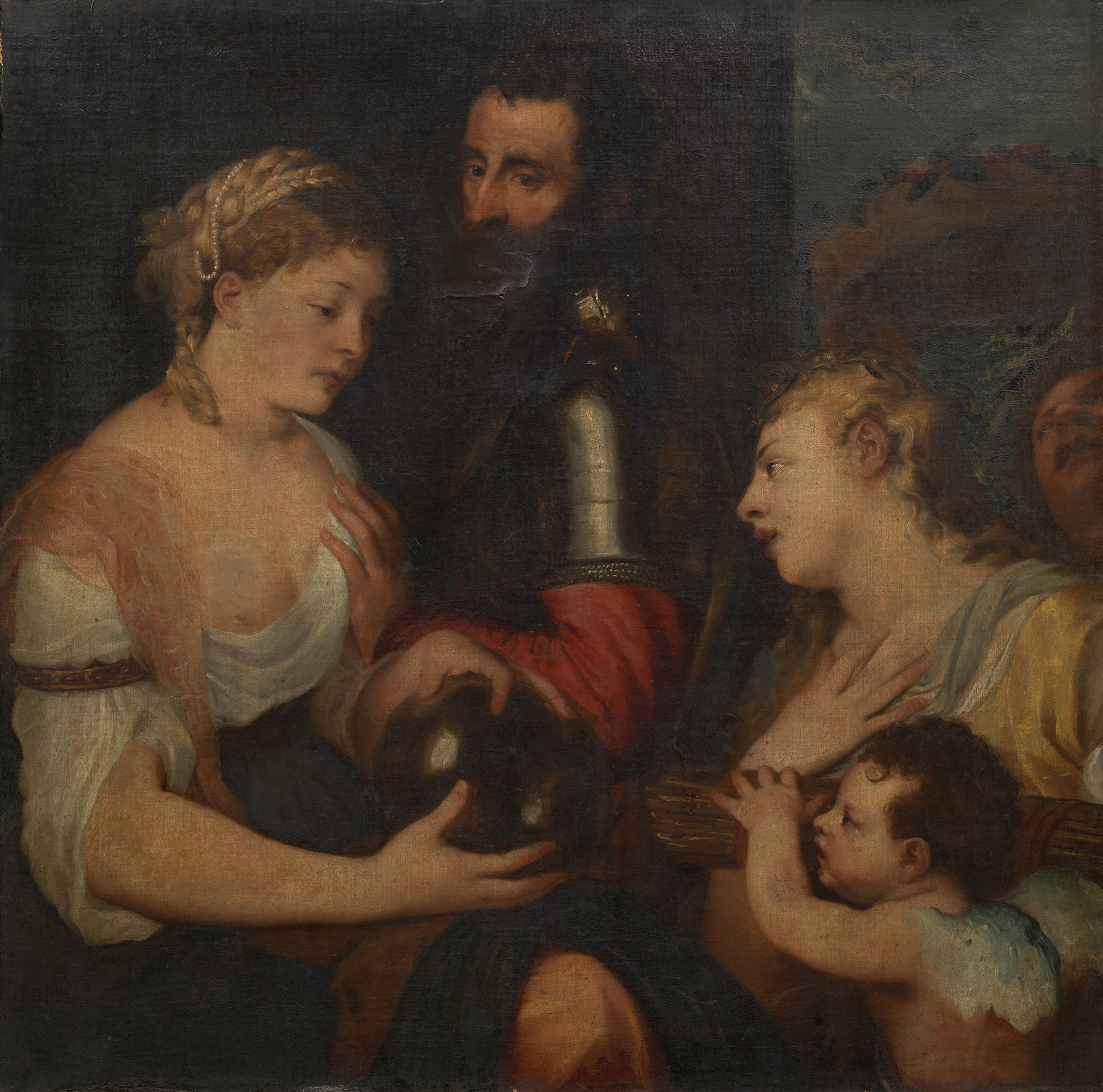
After Titian: Allegory of Alfonso d'Avalos, c. 1625–1649

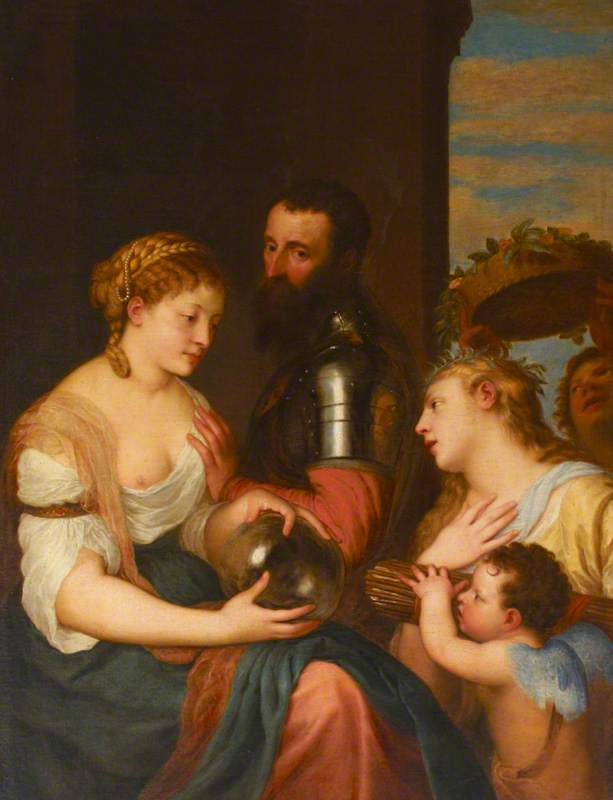
After Titian: An Allegory of Marriage, 17th century

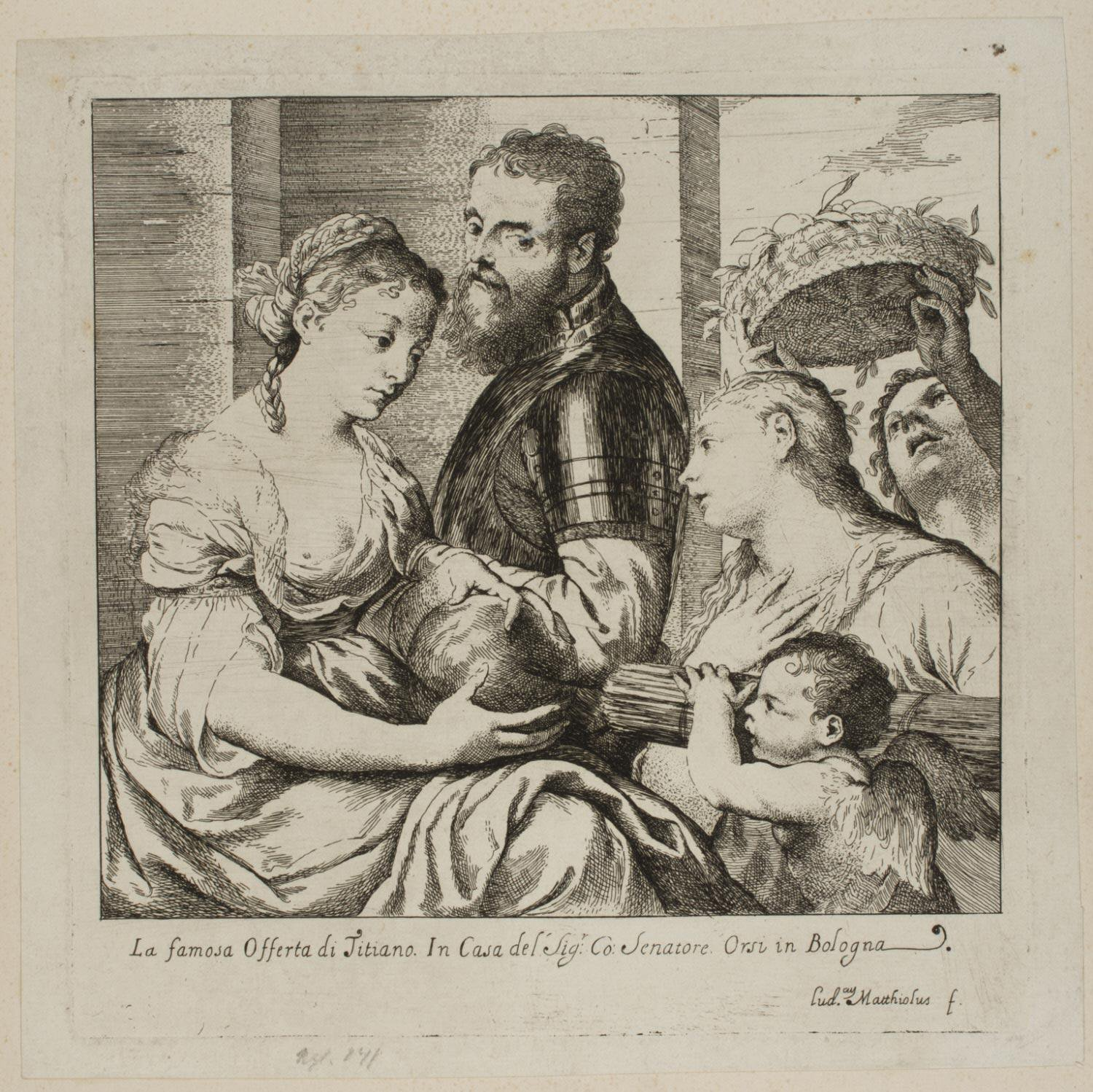
L. Mattioli, after Titian: Allegory of Alfonso d'Avalos, c. 1700

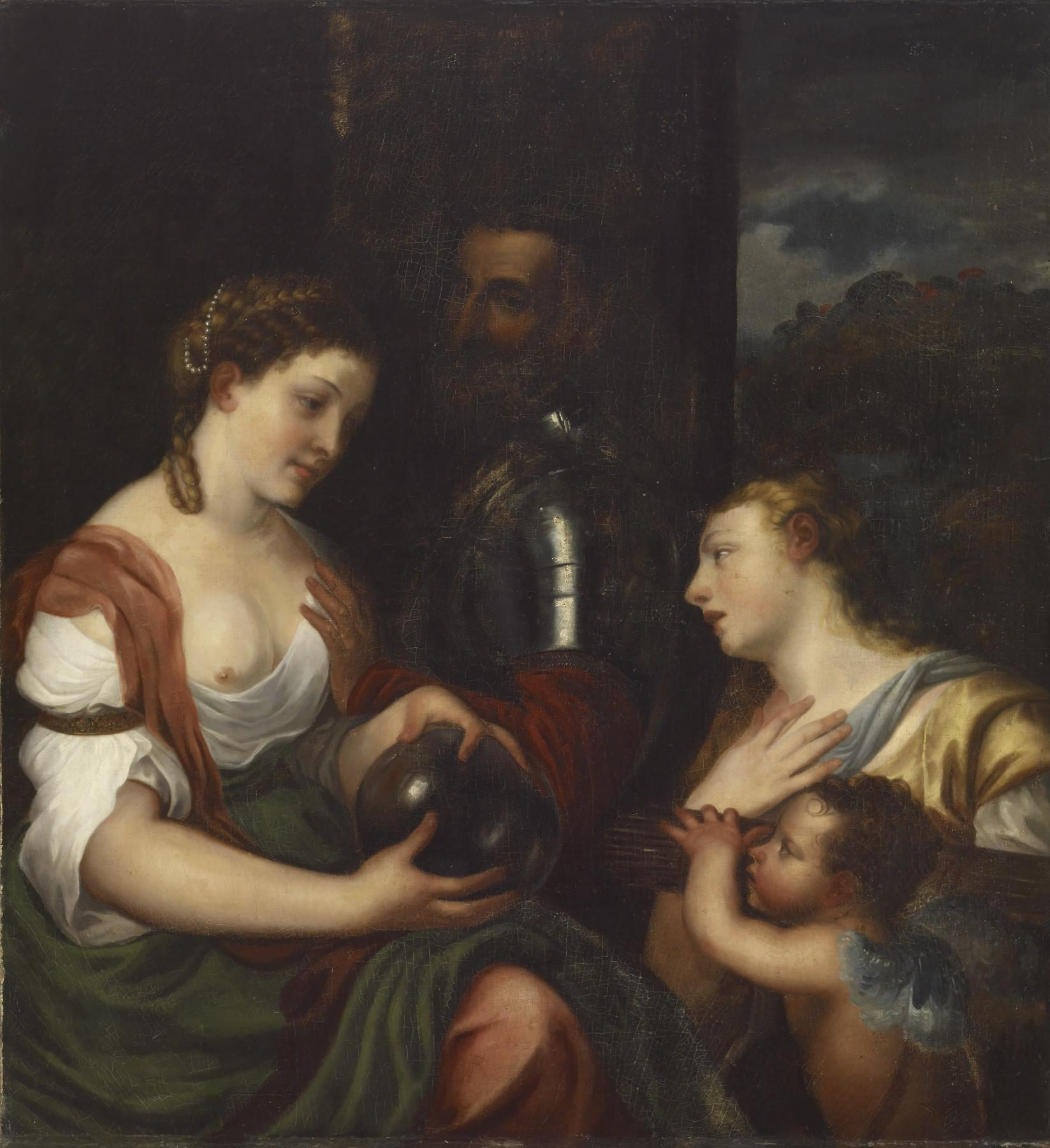
A. J. Miller, after Titian: Allegory of Alfonso d'Avalos, c. 1833

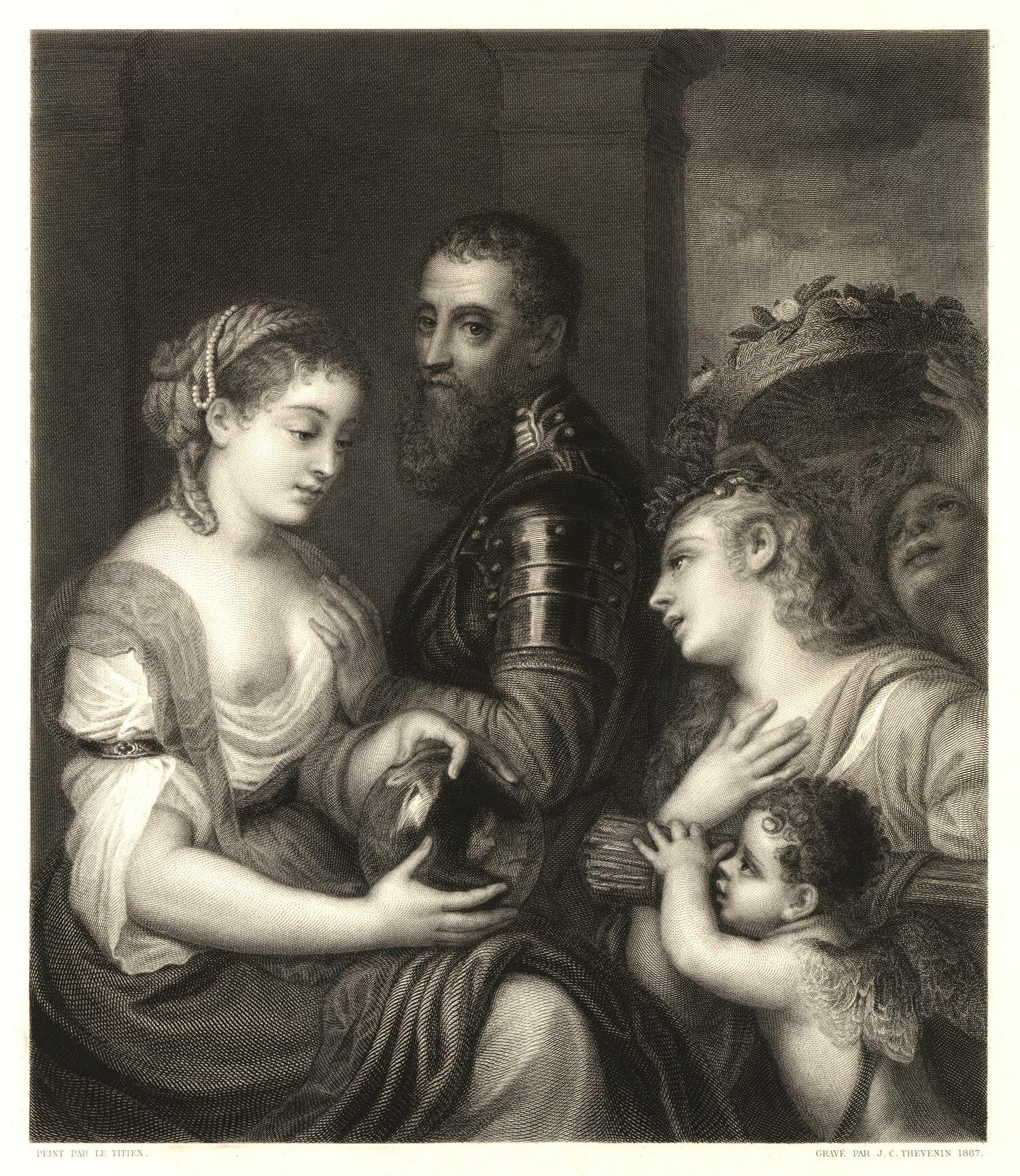
After Titian: Alphonse d'Avalos, Marquis de Guast, 1867

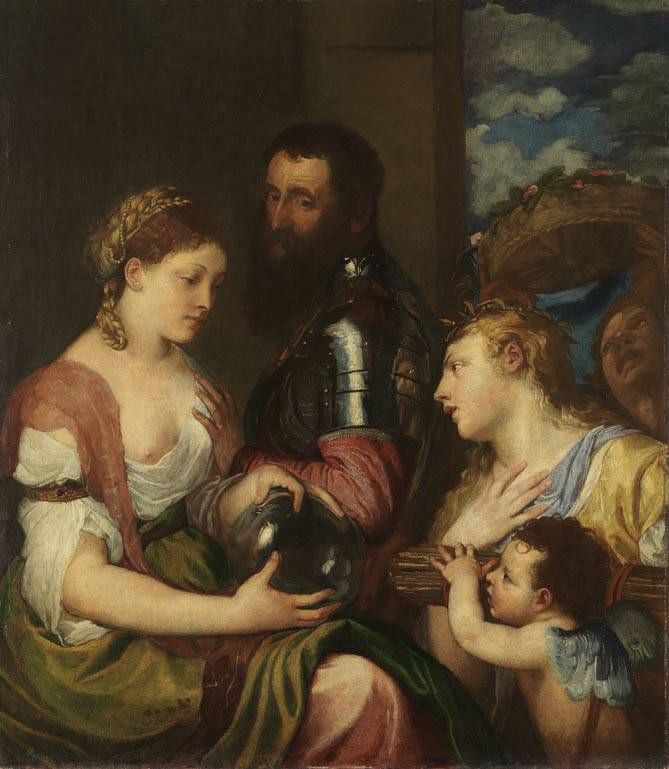
E. F. von Liphart, after Titian: Allegory of Alfonso d'Avalos, c. 1877

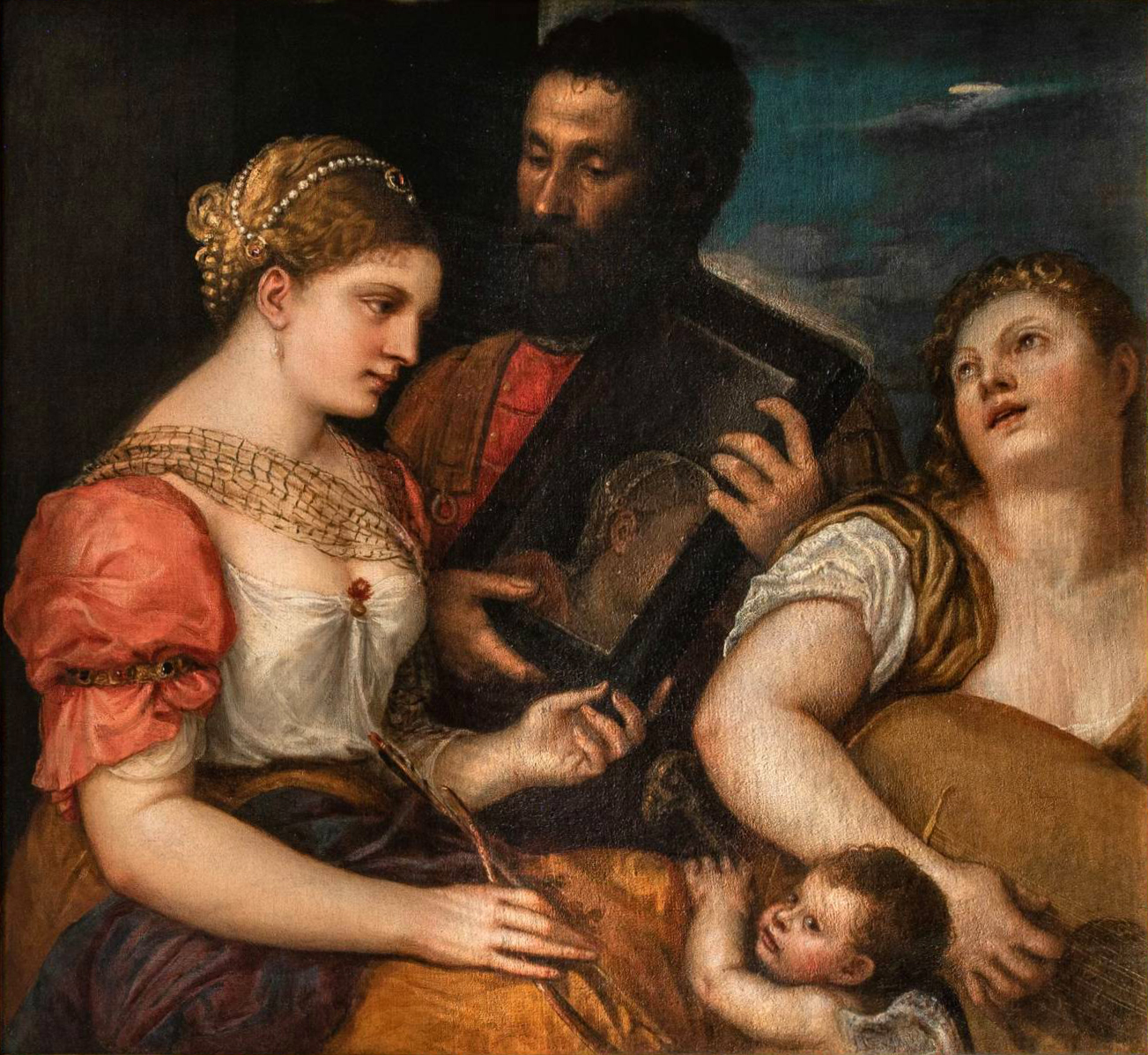
Titian's workshop: Allegory of Love, 1530–40 (Wawel Castle)

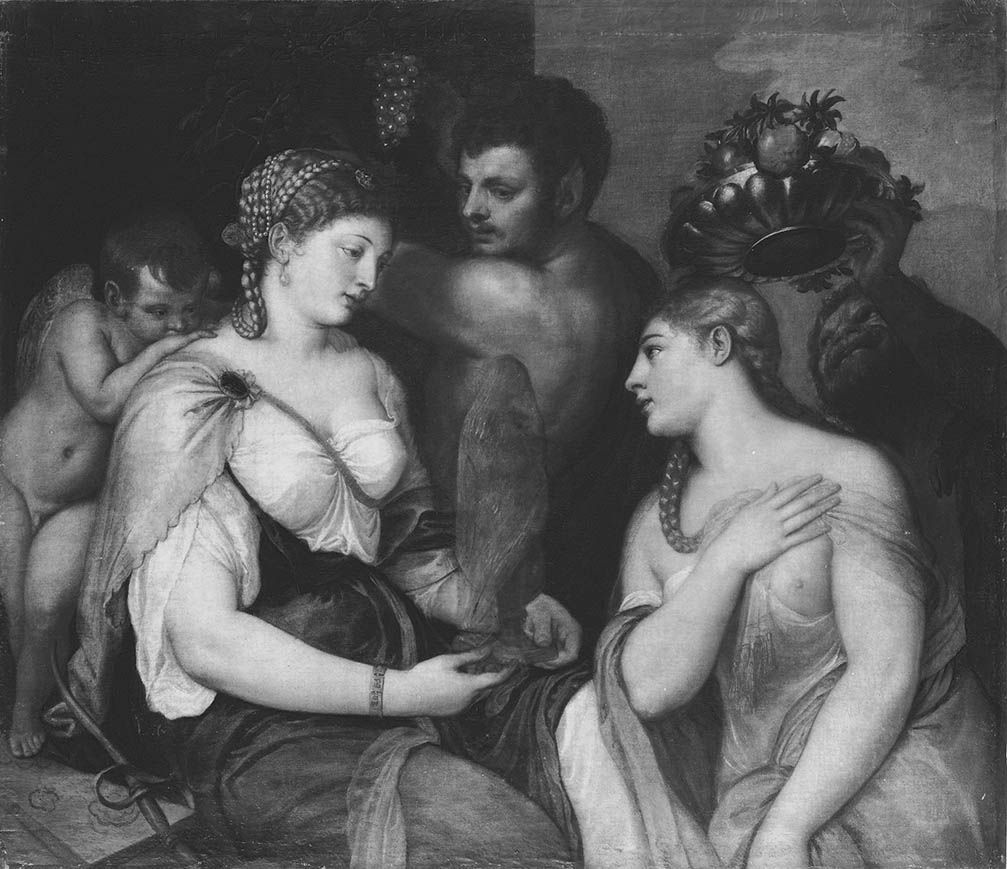
Titian's workshop: Initiation into the Bacchic Mysteries, 16th century

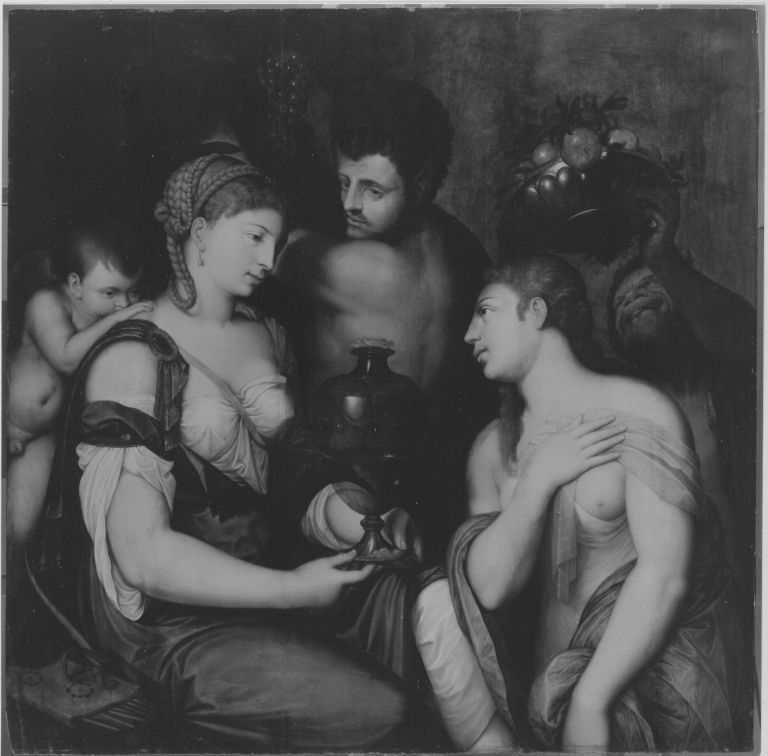
After Titian: Venus, Bacchus and Ceres (Alte Pinakothek)

== Sources ==
- Gronau, Georg (1904). Titian. London: Duckworth and Co; New York: Charles Scribner's Sons. pp. 87–88, 277–278, 284.
- Phillips, Claude (1896). The Picture Gallery of Charles I. London: Seeley and Co. Limited; New York: Macmillan and Co. pp. 94, 98.
- Ricketts, Charles (1910). Titian. London: Methuen & Co. Ltd. pp. 87–88, 179, plate lxvi.
- "Allégorie conjugale (Allégorie de la séparation?), dit à tort Allégorie d'Alphonse d'Avalos". Louvre. Retrieved 27 October 2022.
- "The Allegory of Alfonso D'Avalos c. 1610-90". Royal Collection Trust. Retrieved 27 October 2022.
- "The Allegory of Alfonso D'Avalos c. 1625-49". Royal Collection Trust. Retrieved 27 October 2022.
