= David Cross (disambiguation) =

David Cross (born 1964) is an American comedian and actor.

David Cross may also refer to:

- David Cross, British artist from the pair Cornford & Cross
- David Cross (footballer, born 1950), English footballer
- David Cross (footballer, born 1982), English footballer for Notts County
- David Cross (musician) (born 1949), English rock violinist

== See also ==
- David Kross (born 1990), German actor
- Saint David's Cross, a flag representing the patron saint of Wales
