= Croucher =

Croucher is a surname. Notable people with the surname include:

- Brian Croucher (born 1942), English actor and director
- Charles Croucher, Australian journalist
- Leah Croucher, teenager who disappeared in Milton Keynes, England, in 2019
- Lex Croucher, English author and YouTuber
- Mel Croucher, British entrepreneur and video game pioneer
- Norman Croucher, British mountain climber
- Terence Croucher, British composer and performer

== See also ==
- Cross (surname)
- Crouch (surname)
