= Q45 =

Q45 may refer to:

- Q45 (host), host of the American television series Rap City
- Q45 (New York City bus)
- Al-Jathiya, the 45th surah of the Quran
- Infiniti Q45, an automobile
- Samsung Q45, a laptop
- Intel Q45, an Intel chipsets
