= Daniel Cross =

Daniel Cross may refer to:

- Daniel Cross (filmmaker), Canadian documentary filmmaker and producer
- Daniel Cross (footballer) (born 1983), Australian rules footballer
- Dan Cross (born 1973), American basketball player
- Daniel Cross (Assassin's Creed), a fictional character from Assassin's Creed
- Daniel Cross (Coronation Street), a fictional character from Coronation Street

== See also ==
- Cross (surname)
