= Crouching =

Crouching can mean:

- A human posture usually considered to be synonymous with squatting
- Al-Jathiya, a sura in the Qur'an
