= Michael Cross =

Michael or Mike Cross may refer to:

- Michael Cross (RAF officer) (1942–2022), British Royal Air Force officer
- Michael Cross (painter) (fl. 1633–1660), Anglo-Spanish painter and copyist
- Mike Cross (musician) (born 1946), American singer-songwriter and musician
- Mike Cross (politician) (1944–2013), American businessman and politician in Louisiana
- Mike Cross, American guitarist with Sponge
