= Lionel Crouch =

British solicitor

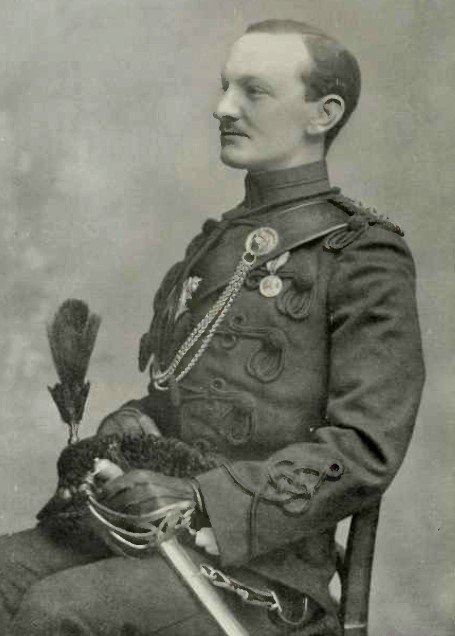
Lionel William Crouch in 1912.

Lionel William Crouch (20 August 1886 – 21 July 1916) was a British solicitor who was killed during the First World War in the Battle of the Somme.

== Early life ==
Lionel William Crouch was born on 20 August 1886 to William Crouch, a Clerk of the Peace to Buckinghamshire County Council, and Helen Marian Crouch née Sissons. He had a younger brother, Guy R. Crouch, who became a captain in the 1st Bucks Battalion of the British Army and was awarded the Military Cross; and a sister Doris. The family home was Friarscroft in Aylesbury, Buckinghamshire.

Crouch was educated at Marlborough College from 1900 to 1904 and went on to qualify as a solicitor in 1909. He worked for Horwood and James in Aylesbury. He was also a deputy Clerk of the Peace for Buckinghamshire. His brother was also a solicitor, with Parrott and Coales.

A keen philatelist, Crouch was vice-president of the Junior Philatelic Society.

== Military career ==
Crouch was an officer in the Oxfordshire and Buckinghamshire Light Infantry, part of the Territorial Force, before the start of the First World War. On the outbreak of the war, in July 1914, the Territorials were mobilised and Crouch left Aylesbury on 4 August while his brother Guy and the bulk of the men left the town by rail the following day. They arrived in Cosham for training with not a man missing which was a source of pride to Crouch.

His battalion left Chelmsford for the front on 30 March 1915.

== Death and legacy ==
Crouch died on 21 July 1916 during the Battle of the Somme. He is buried at Pozières British Cemetery, Ovillers-la Boisselle, Somme, France, and remembered on the war memorial, in Market Square, and on a plaque at St Mary the Virgin church, Aylesbury. In 1917, his father William privately published Lionel's letters from the front to him as Duty and Service with the proceeds donated to war charities.
