= Krouch =

Krouch may refer to:

== People ==
- Vanita Krouch (born 1980), American flag football player
- Zaid Krouch (born 1991), Moroccan footballer

== Places ==
- Krouch Chhmar District, a district in Tboung Khmum province, Cambodia
- Krouch, a khum (commune) of Prey Chhor district, Kampong Cham province, Cambodia

== See also ==
- Crouch (disambiguation)
