= Paul Cross =

Paul Cross may refer to:

- Paul Cross (footballer) (born 1965), footballer for Barnsley
- Paul Cross (rugby league) (born 1945), Australian rugby league footballer
- Paul Cross (swimmer) (born 1979), Australian Paralympic swimmer

== See also ==
- St Paul's Cross
- Paul of the Cross (1694–1775), Italian mystic, and founder of the Passionists
- Cross (surname)
