= Charles Cross =

Charles Cross may refer to:

- Charles Cross (American football) (born 2000), American football player
- Charles Cross (Australian politician) (1891–1955), Australian politician
- Charles Cross (diver) (1887–1963), British Olympic diver
- Charles Cross (footballer) (1900–?), for Crystal Palace and Coventry City
- Charles Frederick Cross (1855–1935), British chemist
- Charles R. Cross, American journalist
- Charles R. Cross (physicist), American physicist
- Charles T. Cross (1922–2008), American diplomat and ambassador
- Charles Whitman Cross (1854–1949), American geologist
- Charles Wilson Cross (1872–1928), Canadian politician
- Charles W. Cross (California politician) (1848–1924), American schoolteacher, attorney and politician in California
- Charles Allen Lechmere (1849–1920), Jack the Ripper suspect, also known as Charles Allen Cross
