= Terence Croucher =

British composer (born 1944)

Terence Croucher (born 1944 in Jutogh, India) is a British composer and performer based in north Cumbria, England.

He has a BA Hons, a Certificate of Education and Licentiate of the Guildhall School of Music (LGSM). His varied musical output includes orchestral and ensemble music, solo instrumental music and numerous teaching materials.

Terry Croucher has been a concert guitarist, playing classical music, rock music, blues music and jazz. For a number of years he wrote monthly columns in guitar magazines.

Over his long musical career he has played in many bands including:

- The Rod Davies Blues Band
- Blind Dogs for the Guides
- Shud B Banned
- The Solway Band

During his time with The Rob Davies Blues Band he played with many famous names including Muddy Waters. He also played with Georgie Fame at the West End Club.

During the 1970s, he co-founded the Leicester Guitar Society and the Leicester Guitar Studio with Julian Wright.

== Recordings ==
- "Jonathan Richards Plays Latin-American Gems" (2006) - Published by: Sain. Performed by Jonathan Richards. Audio CD.
- "Elegy 20th Century Guitar Music" (2006) - Published by: Divine Art. Performed by Jonathan Richards. Audio CD.
- "Forever 30 Romantic Guitar Miniatures" (2006) - Published by: Divine Art. Performed by Jonathan Richards. Audio CD.

== Sheet music ==
- "Elegy" - Published by: Novello. Guitar solos.
- "20 South American Melodies" - Published by: Boosey & Hawkes. Guitar solos.
- "Three Variations on a Japanese Theme" - Published by: Clarendon Music. For four guitars.
- "Divertimento for Guitar" - Published by: Clarendon Music. For guitar.
- "In the Forest ... Drawings by Marlene Croucher" - Published by: Clarendon Music. For guitar.
- "At the Zoo... Drawings by Marlene Croucher" - Published by: Clarendon Music. For guitar.
- "By the Sea... Drawings by Marlene Croucher" - Published by: Clarendon Music. For guitar.
- "Playford's Fancy" - Published by: Clarendon Music. For guitar and various other instruments. (Approx. 40 pieces in 7 books).
