= Ludovico Mattioli =

Italian painter and engraver

Ludovico Mattioli (1662-1747) was an Italian painter and engraver.

== Biography ==
He was born in Crevalcore, but mainly active in Bologna both within the Papal States. He was known for his depictions of landscapes, both in engravings and frescoes. He also painted a few oil canvases. He was a friend of Giuseppe Maria Crespi, and engraved some of Crespi's works. Mattioli was a member of Accademia Clementina.
