= Alex Cross (footballer) =

Scottish footballer

Personal information
- Full name: Alexander Cross
- Date of birth: 16 June 1919
- Place of birth: Rutherglen, Scotland
- Date of death: 4 March 1998 (aged 78)
- Place of death: Milnathort, Scotland
- Positions: Left half; forward

Senior career*
Years	Team	Apps	(Gls)
1938–1946	Queen's Park	21	(2)

International career
1939	Scotland Amateurs	1	(1)
- * Club domestic league appearances and goals

Alexander Cross (16 June 1919 – 4 March 1998) was a Scottish amateur footballer who played in the Scottish League for Queen's Park as a left half. He was capped by Scotland at amateur level.

== Personal life ==
Cross attended Rutherglen Academy.

== Career statistics ==
Appearances and goals by club, season and competition
Club	Season	League			Scottish Cup		League Cup		Other		Total	
Club	Season	Division	Apps	Goals	Apps	Goals	Apps	Goals	Apps	Goals	Apps	Goals
Queen's Park	1938–39	Scottish First Division	20	2	1	0	—		3 (Note: 2 appearances in Glasgow Merchants Charity Cup, 1 appearance in Glasgow Cup)	0	24	2
Queen's Park	1946–47	Scottish First Division	1	0	0	0	3	0	0	0	4	0
Career total			21	2	1	0	3	0	3	0	28	2
