= Peter Cross =

Peter Cross may refer to:

- Peter Cross (painter) (c. 1645/50–1724), English miniature painter
- Peter Cross (engraver) (1815–1862), American engraver
- Pierre Cressoy (1924–1980), French actor sometimes credited as Peter Cross
- Peter Cross (illustrator) (born 1951), British illustrator
- Peter Hulme-Cross, British politician
- Peter Cross (rugby union), English rugby mascot
- Peter Cross (rugby league), Australian rugby league player
- Pete Cross (1948–1977), American basketball player

== See also ==
- Cross of St. Peter
