= Philip Cross =

Irish murderer (1825-1888)

- Born: 1825
- Died: 10 January 1888 (aged 62–63); Cork Jail, Convent Avenue, Sunday's Well, Cork
- Cause of death: Hanging
- Criminal charge: Murder
- Spouse(s): Laura (died 2 June 1887); Effie Skinner (June 1887–10 January 1888, his death)
- Children: 6

Philip Cross (c. 1825 – 10 January 1888) from Shandy Hall, Dripsey, County Cork, Ireland, was a physician convicted and hanged for the murder of his wife after an affair with his children's governess. The case was known in the late 19th century as "the Coachford Poisoning Case" as the house was on the road between the adjacent villages of Dripsey and Coachford.

== Background ==
Cross was a retired British Army surgeon with the rank of major. He resided at Shandy Hall, with his wife Laura and six children. Aside from hunting and fishing, he rarely socialised, although his wife was quite popular. In 1886, Laura hired a 20-year-old governess named Effie Skinner, who had worked at a friend's home, to look after their children.

Cross had a disparaging view of most women, and Laura did not think of anything being stirred up by Ms Skinner. Eventually, however, he seized Effie and kissed her. Effie was upset by this but remained in the household because she liked the children. Since she did not speak to Laura about the incident, Cross believed she accepted his feelings for her. Laura noticed his attentions to Effie and confronted her husband. Laura insisted Effie leave the household and Cross agreed. Cross convinced Effie that Laura had an unreasonable view of her and she should leave the household. Effie believed Cross and moved to Dublin. A correspondence began between the two using assumed names. Gradually, Effie actually did fall in love with Cross. He visited her in Dublin, where they lived there as husband and wife. According to Leonard Parry, Cross wanted to end his marriage but did not want to damage his social position with a divorce.

== Murder ==
Within a short time of this incident, Laura became ill with stomach cramps after suffering vomiting and diarrhoea and thirst. Cross diagnosed typhoid (though Laura said to one friend, "Phil tells me that I have a disease of the heart.") and gave her medication for it. Cross acted as though he was deeply concerned about Laura's health. However, he did not call in any other doctor until the end, when he called in a cousin, Dr Godfrey of Broomhill, Dripsey. Her condition had deteriorated, and she died on 2 June 1887. Cross signed her death certificate (something of a rarity in Victorian murder cases involving physicians). This was followed by a speedy funeral. All this speed did not sit well with the local residents, even though Cross explained that, as typhoid was the supposed cause of death, speed was to prevent any contagion.

Fifteen days after the funeral, Cross married Effie at St. James's Church on Piccadilly in London. He tried to keep this secret, but it was already known when he returned to Shandy Hall. The police acted because of the trail of suspicious circumstances from the time Effie entered the household. Laura's body was exhumed and found to contain high levels of arsenic and strychnine, but no trace of typhoid.

== Trial and conviction ==
As a result, Cross was arrested and tried for his wife's murder at the Munster Assizes before justice Murphy. Cross was defended by Craigie Atkinson, who came up with a defence that since the defendant had served in the Far East, and was acquainted with many barely known subtler poisons, that it was unlikely he would have used arsenic, which is the first poison the police would think of. The prosecution demolished this theory by suggesting that while he was a brilliant man normally, as a criminal Cross behaved like a fool. Motive was shown as was that the doctor had purchased arsenic recently (and had his sister destroy the bottles he used when treating Laura). Cross was quickly found guilty by the jury. Justice Murphy, in pronouncing the sentence of death, said that the crime was one of the most cruel and bloodthirsty of the century. When the murder was uncovered, Effie refused to have anything further to do with the doctor.

Cross was sentenced to be hanged in Cork Prison on 10 January 1888. By the time the day of his execution arrived, his hair had turned white. The executioner was James Berry. The execution was not one of Berry's more successful jobs because of a problem regarding the criminal involved. Cross was a well-born gentleman, and his friends in the area of Cork were from the aristocracy and upper classes. In fact, the governor of the prison did not attend the execution because of his feelings about Cross (he sent a deputy to represent him). Berry found that these friends were at the execution to give Cross some emotional support in his last moments. Cross, grateful for their attendance, wanted to stand at attention with respect to them, facing them as he died. Berry, however, traditionally faced his subjects at executions towards the wall. But each time Berry turned Cross to the wall, the doctor would turn around and face his friends again. When Berry protested, Cross did not reply, but just continued doing what he wanted. Finally, an official ordered Berry to stop this silliness and allow Cross to die facing his friends, reminding the executioner that Cross was a respected soldier, and that turning back and forth might twist the rope and cause an accident (Berry had had several bad executions where the criminals were badly injured before they died or strangled to death). Berry did as he was told, and Cross died. Berry would later say that Cross was the bravest man he ever executed.

Berry was not happy when he officiated at hangings in Ireland because of the dangerous hostility of the Irish to an English executioner. He had been threatened at least once. After being paid, he returned to his home in Bradford, England. Subsequently, he received word to return to Cork because he was needed at an inquest hearing before a coroner's jury on the execution. Berry did not return, but the inquest was eventually completed.

== Theatre ==
The story formed the basis of a musical, Murder at Shandy Hall starring Patrick Bergin at the Briery Gap Theatre in Macroom and in the Cork Opera House in 2017.

== Bibliography ==
- Evans, Stewart P. Executioner: The Chronicles of James Berry, Victorian Hangman. Phoenix Mill, Gloucestershire: Sutton Publishing, 2004, pp. 168–173
- Parry, Leonard A. (1928). Some famous medical trials. New York: C. Scribner's Sons. pp. 31–35. hdl:2027/uc1.$b19558. OCLC 612414908.
- Sheridan, Michael. Murder at Shandy Hall – The Coachford Poisoning Case, Poolbeg Press, 2010.
- Wilson, Colin and Pitman, Pat. Encyclopedia of Murder New York: G. L. Putnam's Sons, 1961, 1962, pp. 169–170.
