= Jack Crouch =

Jack Crouch may refer to:

- Jack Dyer Crouch, II (born 1958), American federal-government official and academic
- Jack Crouch (baseball) (1903–1972), Major League Baseball catcher
- Jack D. Crouch (1915–1989), American entrepreneur and conglomerate organizer

== See also ==
- John Crouch (disambiguation)
