= William Cross =

William Cross may refer to:

- Bill Cross (1917–2015), British soldier
- Billy Cross (American football) (1929–2013), American football player
- Billy Cross (born 1946), American guitarist, singer and producer
- William Cross (politician) (1856–1892), British Member of Parliament for Liverpool West Derby, 1888–1893
- William Cross (rower) (1908–1993), Australian Olympic rower
- William Cross (rugby union) (1851–1890), Scottish rugby union player and referee
- William E. Cross Jr. (born 1940), professor at the CUNY Graduate Center
- Will Cross, American mountain climber
- Willie Cross (1883–1949), Scottish footballer
- The pseudonym of John Williams (convict), transported to Van Diemen's Land
