= Aylesbury War Memorial =

War memorial in Aylesbury, Buckinghamshire, England

Coordinates: 51.8165°N 0.81287°W

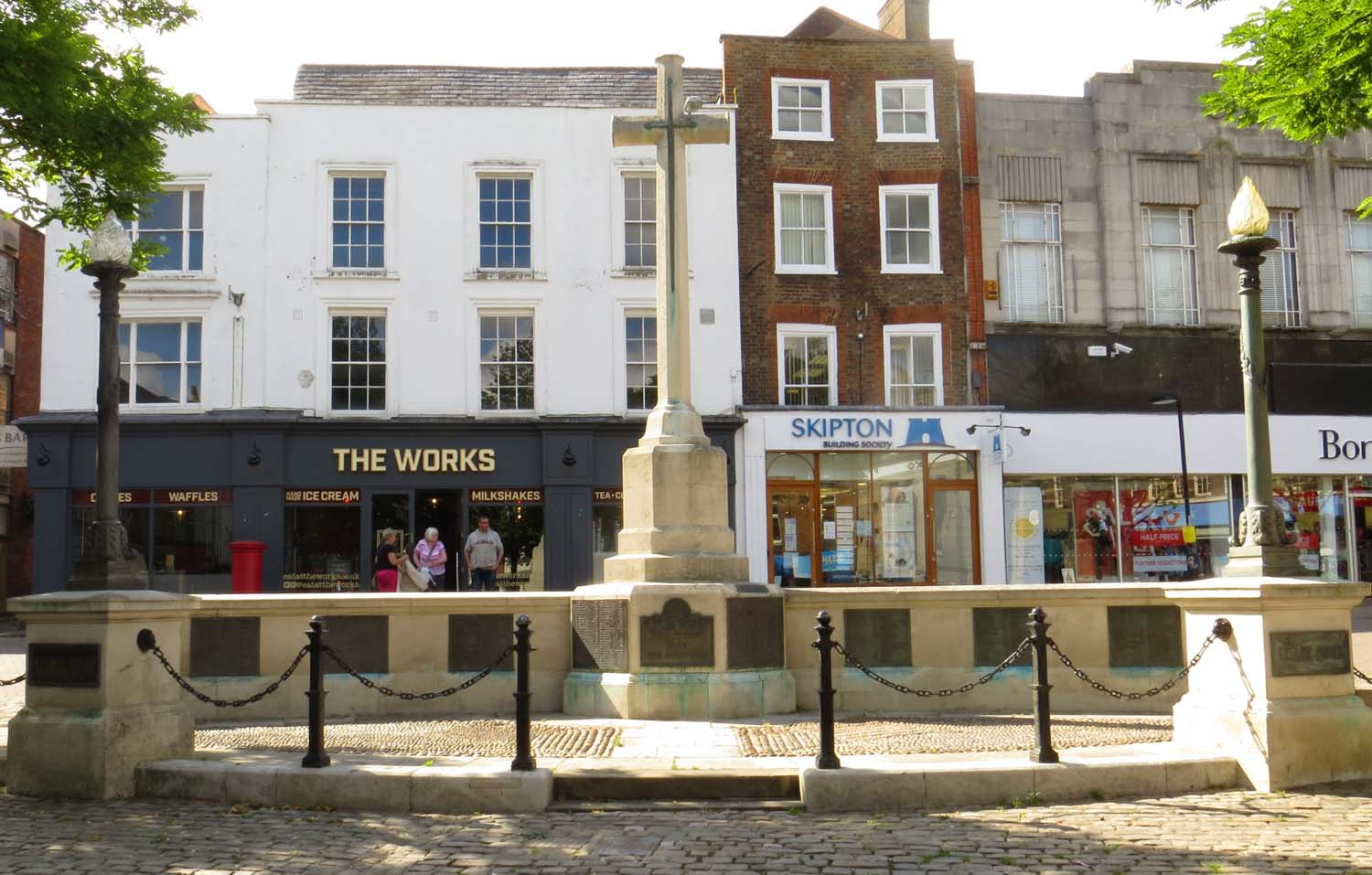
Aylesbury War Memorial in the Market Square

Aylesbury War Memorial is located in Market Square, Aylesbury, Buckinghamshire, England. It is a grade II listed building with Historic England.
