= Charles Cross (footballer) =

English footballer (1900–??)

Personal information
- Date of birth: 15 May 1900
- Place of birth: Coventry, England
- Height: 5 ft 8 in (1.73 m)
- Position: Defender

Senior career*
Years	Team	Apps	(Gls)
?–1922	Coventry City		
1922–1928	Crystal Palace	221	(0)
1928–?	Wolverhampton Wanderers		
- * Club domestic league appearances and goals

Charles A. Cross (born 15 May 1900) was an English professional footballer who played in the Football League for Coventry City, Crystal Palace and Wolverhampton Wanderers, as a defender.

== Playing career ==
Cross began his career at Coventry City and in 1922, signed for Crystal Palace then playing in the Football League Second Division. Between then and 1928, he made 221 League appearances without scoring. Cross then moved on to Wolverhampton Wanderers. He had made 237 senior appearances in all competitions for Palace without scoring.
