= Eliska Cross =

French pornographic actress

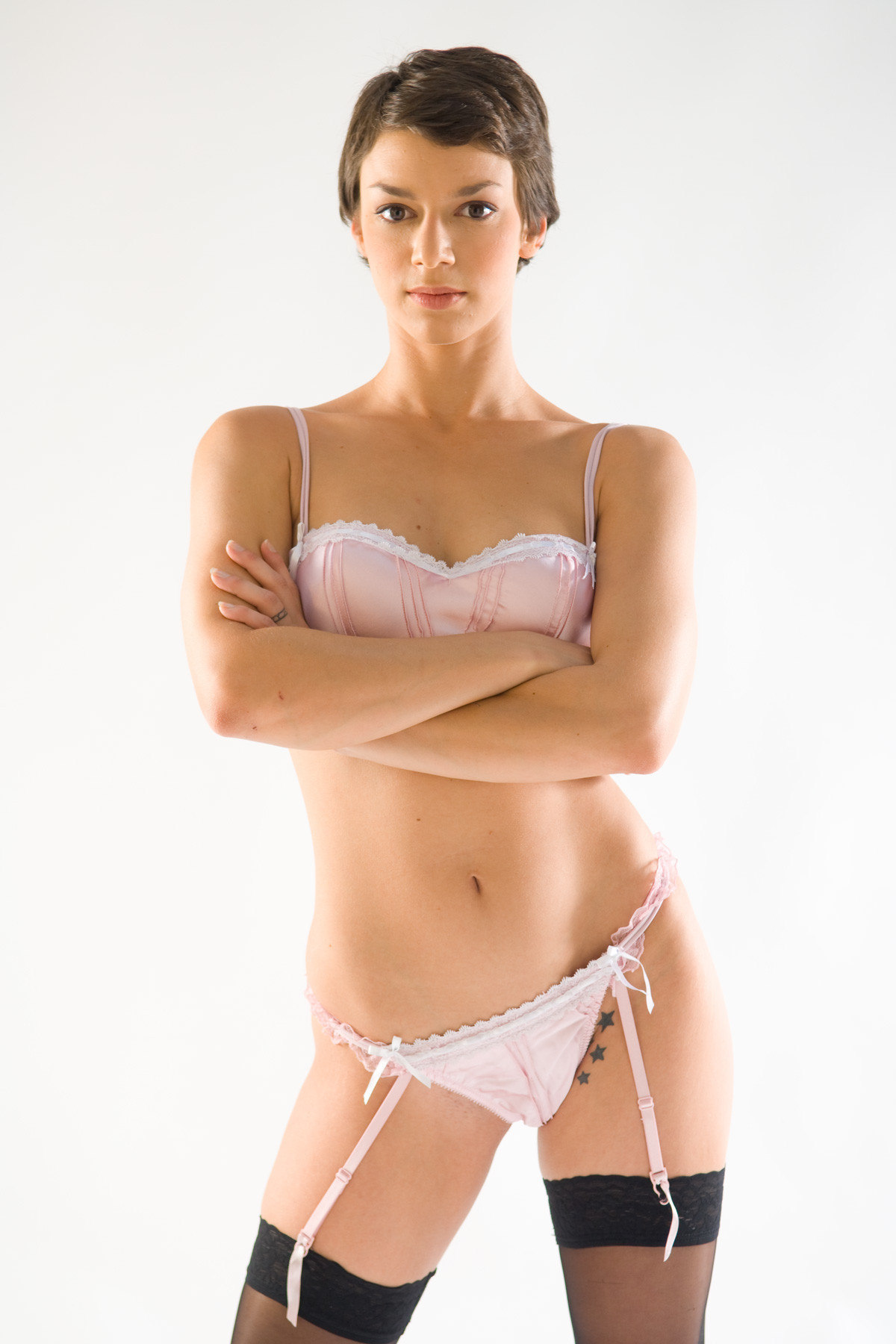
- Born: January 6, 1986 (age 40); Metz, France
- Citizenship: France
- Occupations: pornographic actress, erotic model
- Years active: 2006–2015
- Notable work: Rose, c'est Paris, Black Venus, Lea, Echap

Eliska Cross (born January 6, 1986) is a French actress and former pornographic actress. She began her career in the adult film industry in 2006, working with major studios across Europe and the United States. After retiring from adult films, she transitioned to mainstream cinema and modeling, appearing in films such as Rose, c'est Paris, Black Venus, Lea, and Echap. Cross is also known for her work in light painting photography and has been active as a coach specializing in femininity and personal development since 2009.

== Background ==
Cross started her career as stripper, then she entered the adult film industry in 2006. In 2009, she received two nominations at Hot d'Or for Best French Starlet and Best Actress Blog.

In 2010, Cross focused her career on photo modeling, stripteasing and mainstream cinema. Cross had a leading role in the 2010 low-budget horror film Echap. Her works also include the Serge Bramly's TV movie Rose, c'est Paris, alongside Monica Bellucci, and Abdellatif Kechiche's award-winning drama film Black Venus. Cross also appeared in the France 2 documentary Rhabillage, directed by Ovidie and produced by Jean-Jacques Beineix.
