= Aldobrandini Madonna (Titian) =

Painting by Titian

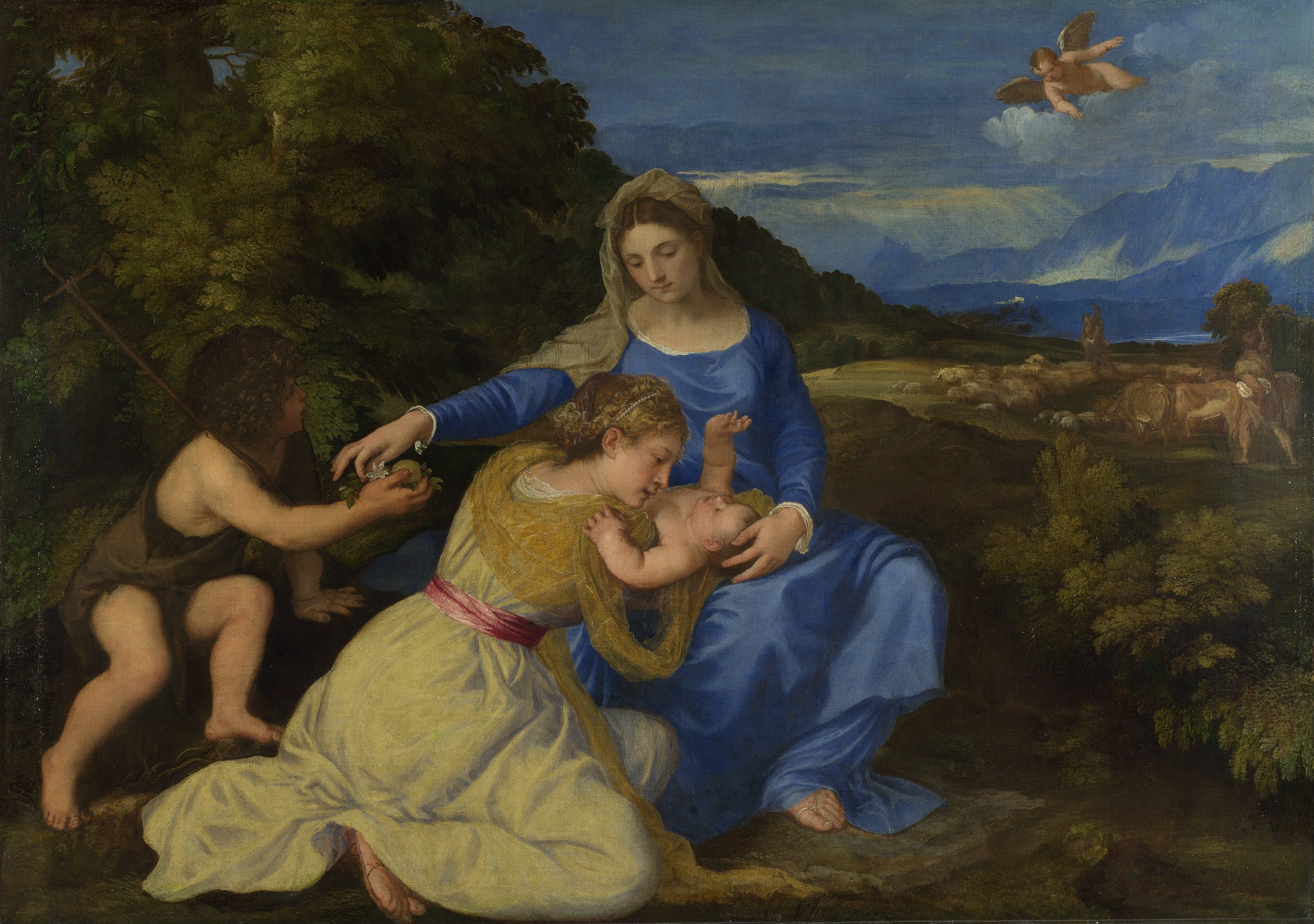
- Artist: Titian
- Year: c. 1532
- Type: Oil on canvas
- Dimensions: 102.4 cm × 143.7 cm (40.3 in × 56.6 in)
- Location: National Gallery, London

The Aldobrandini Madonna (also known as The Virgin and Child with the Infant Saint John and a Female Saint or Donor or The Virgin and Child with the Infant Saint John and Saint Catherine) is an oil painting on canvas by Titian, dating to c. 1530. It is held in the National Gallery, in London. There are studio copies in the Galleria Palatina, in Florence, and in the Kunsthistorisches Museum, in Vienna.

== History ==
Frizzoni proposed identifying this Madonna with the one mentioned in 1532 by Marcantonio Michiel in the Venetian house of Andrea Odoni (subject of a portrait by Lotto), while Tietze thought it was one of three paintings commissioned from Titian by Federico Gonzaga in 1530. It was in the sacristy of the Escorial Monastery before coming to Paris in the 19th century. It then passed through the Beaucousin and Coesvelt collections before being purchased by its present owner in 1860.

== Description ==
In an idyllic meadow, the Virgin Mary is sitting with the Christ Child on her lap. He is offered to the kiss of Saint Catherine of Alexandria (identified by comparison with other works such as the Madonna of the Rabbit, not by the presence of attributes). Saint Catherine is lifting the Child, watched over by the Virgin, and will probably put him down a moment later. Further to the left is Saint John the Baptist offering flowers and fruit to the Virgin. An angel appears in the sky, noticed by some shepherds in the background.

In the works of the 1530s, Titian gradually abandoned magniloquent gestures in favour of other elements. In this case, the interweaving of movements gives the altarpiece a strong compositional unity and the coloristic concert is remarkable, although tarnished by too drastic a cleaning.

Noteworthy is the charm of the chosen colours and the sensitivity towards the landscape, with the brushstrokes becoming more cursive and "modern" away from the foreground.

== See also ==
- List of works by Titian

== Bibliography ==
- Francesco Valcanover, L'opera completa di Tiziano, Rizzoli, Milano 1969.
- Marion Kaminski, Tiziano, Könemann, Colonia 2000. ISBN 3-8290-4553-0
