= John Crouch =

John Crouch may refer to:

- John Crouch (cricketer) (1793–1858), English cricketer
- John Crouch (jockey) (1915–1939), British jockey
- John Crouch (racing driver) (1918–2024), Australian Grand Prix driver
- John Crouch (MP) for Cricklade, England

== See also ==
- Jack Crouch (disambiguation)
