= David Crouch =

David Crouch may refer to:

- David Crouch (historian) (born 1953), British historian
- David Crouch (politician) (1919–1998), British politician
- David N. Crouch (1853–1944), American politician
