= Nick Cross =

Nick Cross or variants may refer to:

- Nick Cross (animator) (born c. 1971), Canadian independent animator
- Nick Cross (American football) (born 2001), professional American football safety
- Nic Cross (born 1999), professional Canadian football linebacker
- Nicky Cross (born 1961), English footballer
