= Mark Cross =

Mark Cross may refer to:

- Mark Cross (artist) (born 1955), a New Zealand artist
- Mark Cross (footballer) (1956–2018), Australian rules footballer
- Mark Cross (musician) (born 1965), British hard rock and heavy metal drummer
- Mark Cross, pen name of author Archibald Thomas Pechey (1876–1961)
- Mark Cross (brand), an American leather goods brand
- Mark Cross, Rotherfield, a hamlet within the parish of Rotherfield, East Sussex
