= Anthony Crosse =

Irish hurler

Personal information
- Born: Ireland

Sport
- Sport: Hurling
- Position: Full Forward
Club
- Years: Club
- 1990 - 1998: Éire Óg Anacarty
Inter-county
Years	County	Apps (scores)
1993-1995	Tipperary	6 (1-10)
Inter-county titles
- Munster titles: 1
- NHL: 1

Anthony Crosse is a former Irish hurling player. He played hurling with his local club Éire Óg Anacarty and with the Tipperary senior inter-county team from 1993 to 1995.

He made his championship debut in 1993 against Kerry in a 4-21 to 2-9 win at Semple Stadium, scoring three points. He went on to score a goal and four points in the 1993 Munster Final win against Clare at the Gaelic Grounds. He played at full forward when Tipperary won the National Hurling League in 1994.
