= Anthony Cross (literary scholar) =

British academic and scholar

Anthony Glenn Cross, FBA (born 1936) is a retired British academic and scholar of modern Russian history. He was Professor of Slavonic Studies at the University of Cambridge between 1985 and 2004.

== Early life and education ==
Cross was born in 1936 and educated at Trinity Hall, Cambridge, graduating in 1960. He then spent a year at Harvard University, where he completed the AM degree, before returning to Trinity Hall to carry out doctoral studies. His PhD was awarded in 1966.

== Academic career ==
Cross became a Lecturer in Russian at the University of East Anglia (UEA) in 1964, promoted to Senior Lecturer in 1969 and Reader in 1972. In 1981 he was appointed Roberts Professor of Russian at the University of Leeds. Four years later he moved back to Cambridge as Professor of Slavonic Studies and a Fellow of Fitzwilliam College. He retired in 2004.

Cross was instrumental in continuing the Russian summer vacation courses that had begun in Cambridge in the 1950s as an offshoot of the Joint Services Schools for Linguists Russian courses. From 1964 onwards he organized a similar course at UEA (the Intensive Russian Vacation Course - IRVC) for three weeks in July-August each year which enjoyed great success, attracting large numbers of students from all over the world. Over the years, however, demand for Russian declined. The course continued after his retirement under Larissa Wymer until 2011, when it was discontinued.

== Honours and awards ==
In 1989, Cross was elected a Fellow of the British Academy, the United Kingdom's national academy for the humanities and social sciences.

Cross was awarded the degree of Litt D by the University of East Anglia in 1981 and a doctorate by the University of Cambridge in 1997.

== Selected publications ==
Cross has published 25 books, including:

- N. M. Karamzin: A Study of His Literary Career 1783–1801 (Southern Illinois University Press, 1971).
- Russia Under Western Eyes: 1517-1825 (HarperCollins, 1971).
- Russian Literature in the Age of Catherine the Great. A collection of essays. (Willem A. Meeuws, 1976)
- By the Banks of the Thames: Russians in Eighteenth-Century Britain (Oriental Research Partners, 1980).
- The Russian Theme in English Literature from the Sixteenth Century to 1980 (Willem A. Meeuws, 1985).
- Anglo-Russica: Aspects of Anglo-Russian Relations in the Eighteenth and Early Nineteenth Centuries (Berg, 1993).
- By the Banks of the Neva: Chapters from the Lives and Careers of the British in Eighteenth-Century Russia (Cambridge University Press, 1997).
- Peter the Great through British Eyes (Cambridge University Press, 2000).
