= Cornford & Cross =

Collaborative pair of UK artists

Cornford & Cross are a collaborative pair of UK artists. Matthew Cornford and David Cross began working together while studying at Central Saint Martins College of Art and Design in 1987, graduating from the Royal College of Art in 1991.

They have produced installations for City Limits, EAST International, and In the Midst of Things. Their project, Childhood’s End, was produced by Film and Video Umbrella and purchased by the Contemporary Art Society in 2001. Their work has been exhibited in the UK at the Bluecoat Gallery of Liverpool, the Northern Gallery of Contemporary Art, the Institute of Contemporary Arts, The Photographers' Gallery, and the South London Gallery. Their work has also been displayed in the United States at the Basekamp Gallery of Philadelphia, the Marcel Sitcoske Gallery of San Francisco, and the Nikolai Fine Art gallery of New York City. In 2000 they held an Arts Council residency at the London School of Economics, and in 2004 a British Council artists’ residency in Guangzhou, China.

== Selected works ==
Their 1996 work Camelot, provoked local controversy after the artists erected steel security fencing around grass areas in Albion Square, Stoke-on-Trent as part of a public commission.

In 1998, for 10, they advertised in Derby for contestants to take part in a beauty contest. A computer analysed photographs of the participants and picked out the most symmetrical faces. The enlarged images of the winners were put in order of their 'percentage of beauty'.
