= Anthony Cross (cricketer) =

English cricketer

Personal information
- Full name: Anthony John Cross
- Born: 5 August 1945 (age 81); Fulmer, Buckinghamshire, England
- Batting: Right-handed
- Bowling: Right-arm off break
- Role: Occasional wicket-keeper

Domestic team information
- Years: Team
- 1969: Warwickshire
- 1966–1967: Cambridge University

Career statistics
Competition	First-class
Matches	6
Runs scored	151
Batting average	16.77
100s/50s	–/–
Top score	39*
Balls bowled	–
Wickets	–
Bowling average	–
5 wickets in innings	–
10 wickets in match	–
Best bowling	–
Catches/stumpings	2/–
- Source: Cricinfo, 13 July 2012

Anthony John Cross (born 5 August 1945) is a former English cricketer. Cross was a right-handed batsman who bowled right-arm off break. He was born at Fulmer, Buckinghamshire.

While studying at the University of Cambridge, he made his first-class debut for Cambridge University against Northamptonshire at Fenner's in 1966. He made four further first-class appearances for the university, the last of which came against Northamptonshire at Fenner's in 1967. In his five first-class matches for the university, he scored a total of 113 runs at an average of 16.14, with a high score of 39 not out. He later made a single first-class appearance for Warwickshire against Scotland in 1969 at Edgbaston. Scotland won the toss and elected to bat first, making 251/9 declared. Warwickshire responded in their first-innings by making 200/7 declared, with Cross scoring 18 runs before he was dismissed by Keith Hardie. Scotland then reached 155/6 declared in their second-innings, leaving Warwickshire with a target of 207 for victory. However, Warwickshire fell just short in their chase, making 202 all out, with Cross scoring 20 runs before he was dismissed by Hardie.
