= Michael Cross (painter) =

Painter in Spain and England

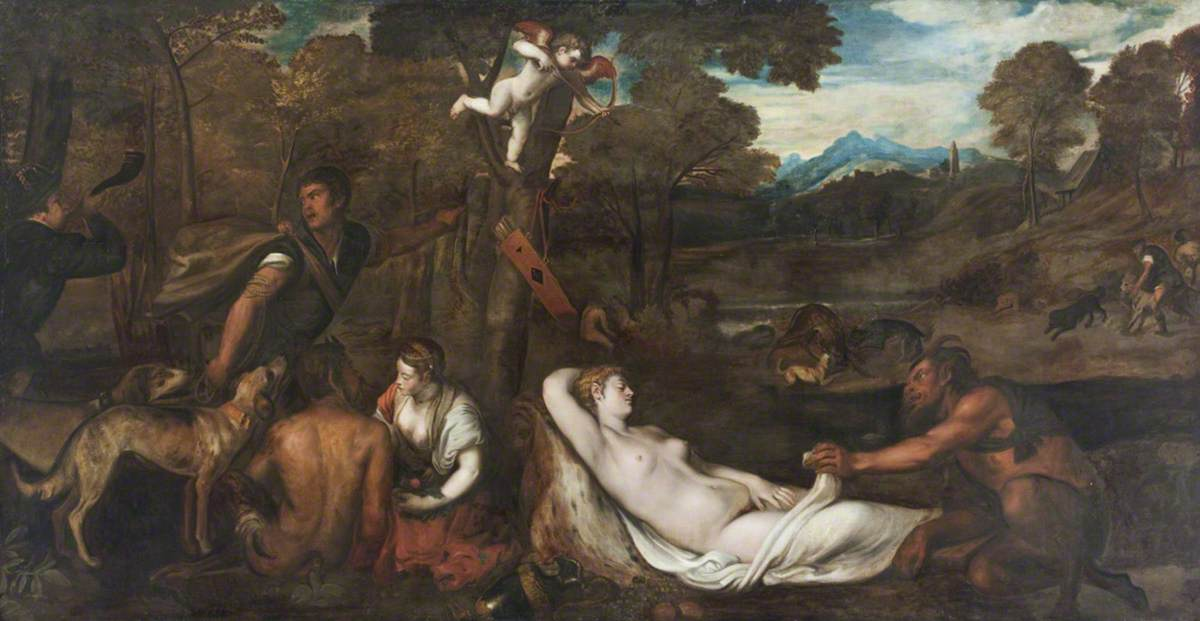
After Titian's Pardo Venus (1623–49)

Michael Cross (fl. 1633–1660) was a Spanish painter and copyist active mainly in England.

== Life ==
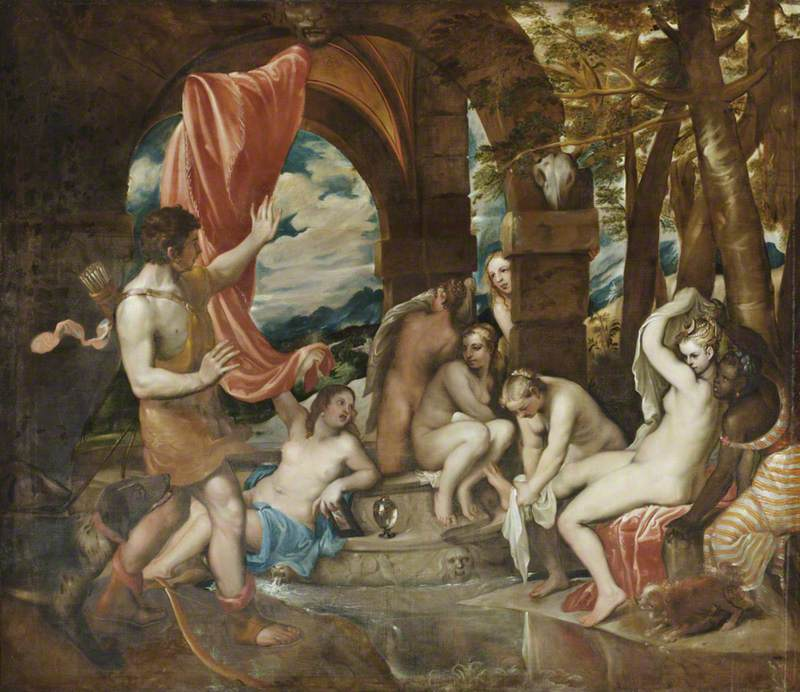
After Titian's Diana and Actaeon (1625–45)

The painter Michael Cross, of unknown parentage, place of birth, and training, obtained great renown as a copyist in the reign of Charles I. He is doubtless identical with Miguel de la Cruz, a painter at Madrid, who in 1633 executed copies for Charles I of the principal pictures in the royal galleries at Madrid, in memory of Charles's visit to Spain. According to some authorities he died early, but he was employed by Charles I to copy pictures in Italy, and a story has been handed down that while at Venice he copied a Madonna by Raphael in San Marco so accurately that he was able to substitute his copy for the original picture and bring the original back to England as his own handiwork. There does not seem, however, to be any record of any such picture by Raphael at Venice, and it is not likely that Charles I would be so easily duped. This picture is stated to have been sold at the dispersal of the King's collection to the Spanish ambassador. From the fact of his name being anglicised it would appear that he resided in England, and it is on record that he made copies of Vandyck's Charles I on a Dun Horse, Titian's Rape of Europa, Venus and Adonis, and several other Titians. In the catalogue of Charles I's collection there is mentioned "A piece of our Lady, copied at the Escurial in Spain, after Raphael Urbin, by Mich. de la Croy". This picture may have given rise to the story alluded to above.

After the Restoration, Cross petitioned Charles II to redeem a promise made to the petitioner while at Caen in Normandy, for the renewal of a pension of 200l. per annum granted him by Charles I during twenty-eight years for services, "both in Spaine in coppying of old peeces of famous painters, and in Italie in making newe collections". He is not otherwise recorded among those active purchasing on the King's behalf.

== Name ==
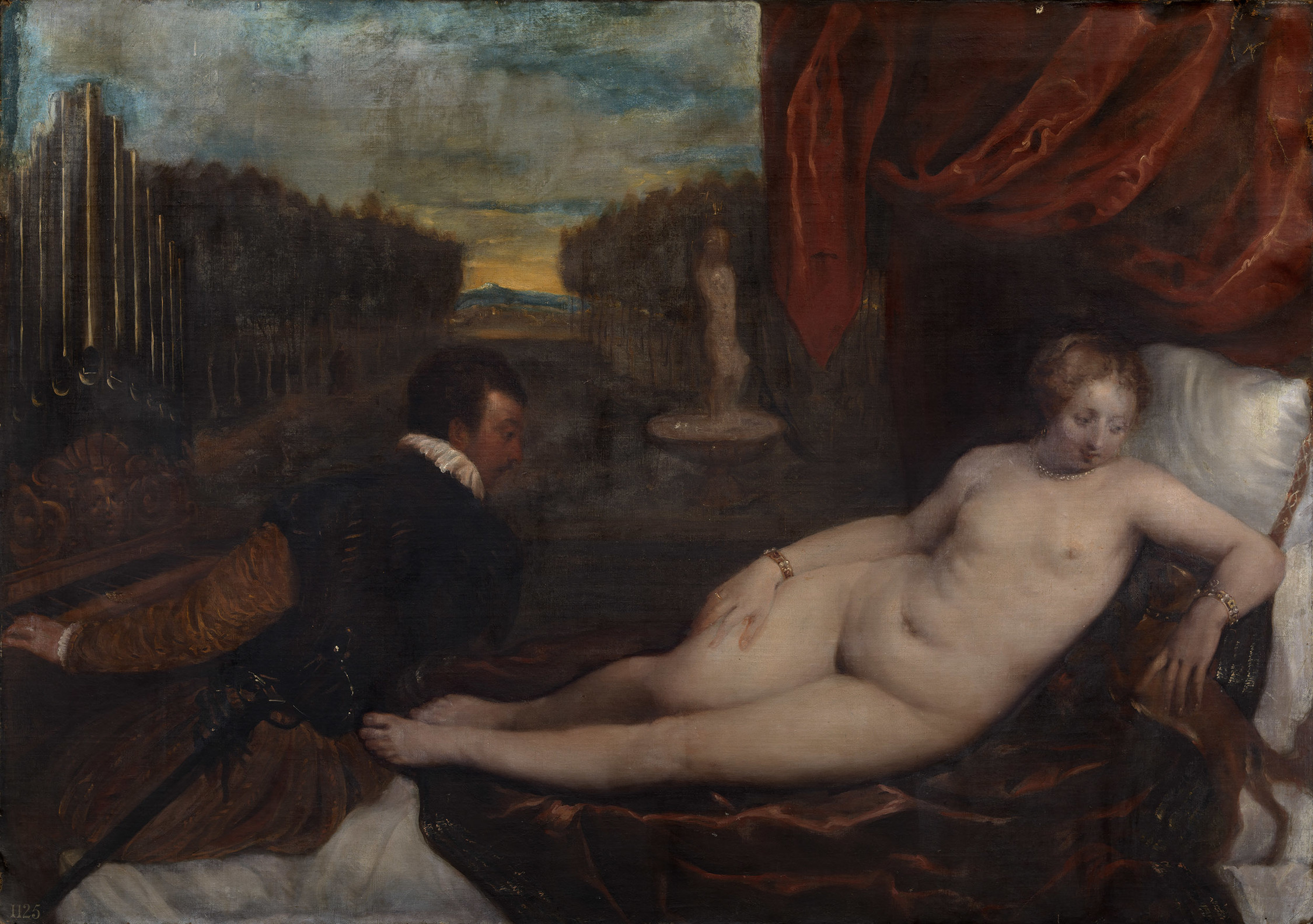
After Titian's Venus with an Organist (c. 1550–1660)

Michael Cross (also spelled Crosse and Crass) was also called Miguel de la Cruz, Michaell de la Croy, and Michaell La Croix.
