= David Cross (footballer, born 1982) =

English footballer

Personal information
- Date of birth: 7 September 1982 (age 44)
- Place of birth: Bromley, England
- Position: Forward

Senior career*
| Years | Team | Apps | (Gls) |
| 1999–2002 | Notts County | 1 | (0) |
- * Club domestic league appearances and goals

David Cross (born 7 September 1982) is an English footballer who played in The Football League for Notts County. His only appearance for County came in a 2–1 defeat away at Chesterfield at the end of the 1999–2000 season.
