= Al-Jathiya =

45th chapter of the Qur'an

Surah 45 of the Quran
الجاثية Al-Jāthiyah Crouching
- Qira'ah; English text
- Classification: Meccan
- Other names: The Kneeling, Hobbling, Kneeling Down
- Position: Juzʼ 25
- No. of verses: 37
- No. of Rukus: 4
- No. of words: 488
- No. of letters: 2014

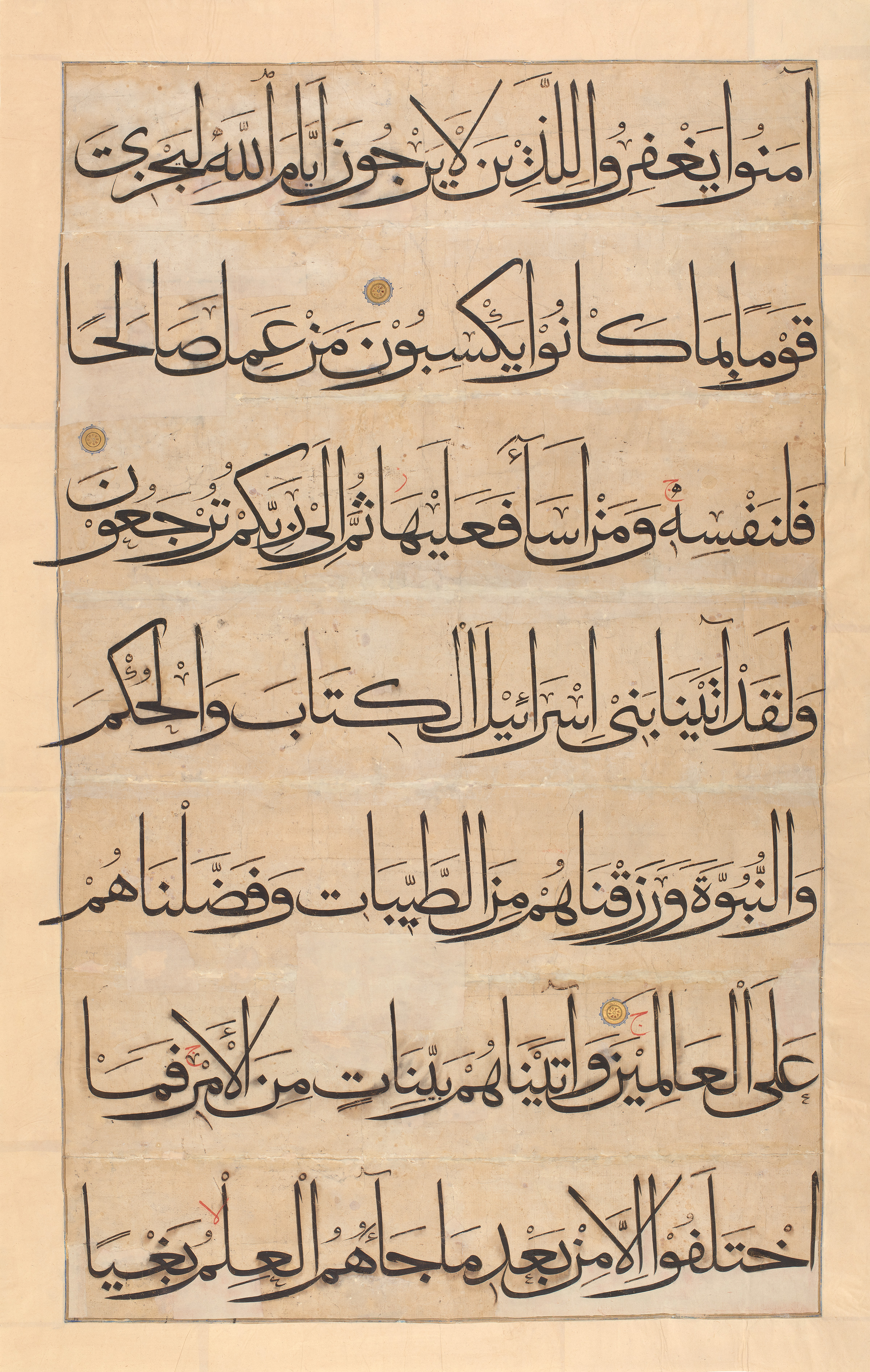
Page from the Qur'an manuscript with the verses 9 - 13 of the surah Al-Jathiyah. Commissioned by Timur (1370 - 1405) and copied by calligrapher Umar Aqta this manuscript was one of the largest Qur'ans ever made. With their original borders, each folio would have measured about 2.25 × 1.5 m. Muhaqqaq script, 177 × 101 cm. Art and History Collection, on loan in Arthur M. Sackler Gallery

The Kneeling, (Arabic: الجاثية, al-jāthiyah; meaning: 'Upon Their Knees', 'Crouching') is the 45th chapter (surah) of the Qur'an with 37 verses (ayah). It is a Meccan chapter, believed revealed according to the Islamic tradition during the Meccan phase of Muhammad's prophethood. This is one of the seven chapters in the Qur'an that start with the Muqattaʿat Hāʼ Mīm. It contains discussions of "signs of God" for humankind to reflect on, and describes punishments for those who deny God despite the signs. It also contains the only Quranic verse mentioning sharia, a term which Muslims later use to refer to the Islamic law.

== Summary ==
The chapter starts with the Muqattaʿat Hāʼ Mīm, the sixth of seven Quranic chapters to do so. The following verses (2–15) discuss the "signs of God", such as the order in nature as well as its ability to serve humanity. The verses exhort mankind to reflect upon those signs and warn them of the punishment for those who turn away from God despite the signs.

Verse 16 talks about the Children of Israel, whom it says were sent with the Book (Torah) and multiple prophets, and were "favored above the world". The following verse, however, criticized the Jews of Medina for rejecting the message of Muhammad.

Verse 18 is the only verse in the Quran that explicitly mentions the term sharia. A partial translation of the verse reads: "We have ordained for you a sharia to live in line with". Linguistically, the Arabic term sharia means "a straight, smooth path that leads to water", which in the context of Arabian desert culture could also mean "a path to salvation from death". This term later became a technical term for the Islamic law, but according to scholar of Islam Bassam Tibi, this term was initially understood as referring to a morality, not law.

The remaining verses (20–37) contain Quranic descriptions of the Judgment Day and the fate of those who deny the signs of God, i.e. the nonbelievers. Verse 28 describes that "every community will be upon its knees" on Judgment Day, a passage which gives the chapter its name.

== Ayat (verses) ==
- 1-2 The Quran a revelation from God
- 3-5 God revealed in his works
- 6-10 Punishment of those who reject the Quran
- 11-12 God’s mercy seen in his works of providence
- 13-14 Muslims exhorted to forgive the unbelievers
- 15-16 The Book of the law, wisdom, and prophecy given to the Israelites
- 17-19 Muhammad received the Quran
- 20 The wicked and just not rewarded alike
- 21-22 Unbelievers and idolaters threatened
- 23-25 God the author of life, therefore may raise the dead
- 26-34 Contrasted condition of believers and unbelievers in the judgment
- 35-37 Praise to the Lord of the universe

== Revelation history ==
According to the Islamic tradition, Al-Jathiya is a Meccan surah, that is, a chapter revealed during the Meccan phase of Muhammad's prophethood. Some Islamic scholars, however, believed that the verse 14—unlike the rest of the chapter—were revealed during the Medinan phase.

The Quranic commentator Ibn al-Jawzi (d. 1200) believes the chapter was revealed immediately after the revelation of Ad-Dukhan. The traditional Egyptian chronology puts the chapter's revelation order as after al-Dukhan (al-Jathiya at 65th while al-Dukhan is at 64th). The Nöldeke Chronology (by the orientalist Theodor Nöldeke) puts it as the 72nd, not after al-Dukhan but after the chapter Fussilat.

== Names ==
The name al-Jathiya ("The Kneeling") comes from a phrase in verse 28 which says that "every community will be upon its knees" on the Judgement Day. It is also called al-Dahr ("Time") after the word's presence in verse 24. Another name is al-Shariah, because the chapter is the only one in the Quran explicitly mentioning the term "sharia".
