= Bibliography of Christianity in China =

This is a list of selected references for Christianity in China.

- David H. Adeney: China - Christian Students Face the Revolution, Downers Grove IL: InterVarsity Press, 1973, ISBN 0-87784-354-6
- David Aikman: Jesus in Beijing: How Christianity is Transforming China and Changing the Global Balance of Power, Washington DC: Regnery Publishing, Inc., 2003, ISBN 978-0-89526-128-1
- C. W. Allan: Jesuits at the Court of Peking, Shanghai, 1935, ISBN 0-313-27044-9
- Josef Alt SVD (ed.): Arnold Janssen SVD, Letters to China. Vol.1: 1879-1897. Studia Instituti Missiologici SVD 80, Steyler Verlag: Nettetal 2003, 544 pp., ISBN 978-3-8050-0490-9
- Richard Arens: The Pursuit of True Humanity. Repression has not dimmed the light of China’s Catholic University. In: The Word in the World 1967. Divine Word Missionaries: Techny, Illinois 1967, 58–64.
- Lauren Arnold: Princely Gifts and Papal treasures: The Franciscan Mission to China and Its Influence on the art of the West, 1250-1350, San Francisco: Desiderata Press, 1999, ISBN 0-9670628-0-2
- Rachel Attwater: Adam Schall, a Jesuit at the Court of China, 1592-1666, London, 1963
- Alvyn J. Austin: Saving China: Canadian Missionaries in the Middle Kingdom 1888-1959, Toronto: University of Toronto Press, 1986, ISBN 0-8020-5687-3
- Alvyn J. Austin: China's Millions: The China Inland Mission and the Late Qing Dynasty, 1832-1905, Grand Rapids MI/Cambridge UK: Eerdmans, 2007, ISBN 978-0-8028-2975-7
- Suzanne Wilson Barnett: Anmeldelse av Thomas A. Breslins "China, American Catholicism, and the Missionary" i The Journal of Asian Studies, Vol. 41, No. 2 (February 1982), s. 311–313
- David B. Barrett, George T. Kurian og Todd M. Johnson: World Christian Encyclopedia: A Comparative Survey of Churches and Religions in the Modern World, 2. utg., Oxford University Press, 2001, to bind, ISBN 0-19-507963-9
- Peter Barry: «The Formation of the Chinese Catholic Patriotic Association», i Ching Feng 24 (1981), s. 120ff
- Daniello Bartoli: Dell'istoria delle Compagnia de Gesù. Terza parte dell'Asia, Ancona: Giuseppe Aureli, 1843, Bind 4
- Daniel J. Bauer SVD: Fu Jen Catholic University Celebrates 70th Anniversary with Memory Book. In: SVD Word in the World 2001, Techny, Illinois, USA 2001, 119–127.
- Miner Searle Bates: «Churches and Christians in China, 1950-1967: Fragments of Understanding», i Pacific Affairs Vol. 41, No. 2 (Summer, 1968), pp. 199–213
- Miner Searle Bates: «The Theology of American Missionaries», i J.K. Fairbank (red.): The Missionary Enterprise in China and America, Cambridge, Massachusetts, 1974, s. 135–138
- Alfred Baudrillart og etterfølgende (red.): «Chine», i Dictionnaire d'Histoire et de Géographie Eccléstiastiques, XII. bind (stikkord Chine), Paris, 1953
- Thomas J. Bauer, M.M.: «The Systematic Destruction of the Catholic Church in China», New York: World Horizons Report No. 11, 1954
- Henri Bernard[-Maitre], S.J.: Aux Portes de la Chine. Les missionaires du seizieme Siècle (1514–1588), Tientsin, 1933
- Henri Bernard[-Maître], S.J.: «Les sources mongoles et chinoises de l'atlas Martini (1655)», i Monumenta Serica 12 (1947), s. 127-144 (Nyopptrykk i Malek/Zingerle (utg.): Martino Martini S.J. (1614–1661) und die Chinamission im 17. Jahrhundert, Nettetal: Steyl, 1996, s. 224–240
- Johannes Bettray: Die Akkomodationsmethode des P. Matteo Riccis S.J. in China, Roma: Gregoriana, 1955
- Stephen B. Bevans, S.V.D. og Roger P. Schroeder, S.V.D.: Constants in Context: A Theology of Mission for Today, Maryknoll NY: Orbis, 2005, ISBN 1-57075-517-5
- Benno M. Biermann, O.P.: Die Anfänge der neueren Dominikanermission in China, Aschendorffsche, Münster, 1927
- Benno M. Biermann, O.P.: «War Martino Martini Chinesischer Mandarin?», i Neue Zeitschrift für Missionswissenschaft 11 (1955), s. 221-226 (Nyopptrykk i Malek/Zingerle (utg.): Martino Martini S.J. (1614–1661) und die Chinamission im 17. Jahrhundert, Nettetal: Steyl, 1996, s. 217–221
- J. Leonard Blussé van Oud-Alblas: «Retrition and Remorse between the Administration and the Protestant Mission in Early Colonial Formosa», i Gyan Prakash: After Colonialism: Imperial Histories and Postcolonial Displacements, Princeton: Princeton University Press, 1994, s. 153–182, ISBN 0-691-03743-4
- Bonifacio Bolognani, O.F.M.: L'Europa scopre il volto della Cina; Prima biografia di Padre Martino Martini, Trento, 1978
- Fritz Bornemann : Ars sacra Pekinensis : Die chinesischchristliche Malerei an der Katholischen Universität Fu Jen in Peking. Mödling bei Wien : Missionsdruckerei St. Gabriel, 1950. X, 239 pp.
- Paul Bornet: «L'apostolat laïque an Chine aux XVIIe et XVIIIe siècles», i Bulletin Catholique de Pékin (janvier-mars 1948)
- David J. Bosch: Transforming Mission: Paradigm Shifts in Theology of Mission (American Society of Missiology Series, No. 16), Maryknoll NY: Orbis, 1991, ISBN 0-88344-719-3
- Charles R. Boxer: The Dutch Seaborne Empire 1600-1800, London: Hutchinson 1965—nyopptrykk Pelican Books i 1973 og Penguin Books i 1991, ISBN 0-14-013618-5
- Ernest Brandewie: The Last Shall Be First. The Life of Thomas Tien Keng-hsin, China's First Cardinal. Studia Instituti Missiologici SVD 89, Steyler Verlag: Nettetal 2007, 203 pp., ISBN 978-3-8050-0552-4
- Nat Brandt: Massacre in Shansi, Syracuse: Syracuse University Press, 1994, ISBN 1-58348-347-0
- Thomas A. Breslin: China, American Catholicism, and the Missionary, University Park: Pennsylvania University Press, 1980
- Liam Matthew Brockey: Journey to the East: The Jesuit mission to China, 1579-1724, Cambridge MA: The Belknap Press of Harvard University Press, ISBN 978-0-674-02448-9
- Alfred Broomhall: Hudson Taylor and China's Open Century: Barbarians at the Gates. London: Hodder and Stoughton, 1982
- Alfred Broomhall: Hudson Taylor and China's Open Century: Over The Treaty Wall. London: Hodder and Stoughton, 1982
- Alfred Broomhall: Hudson Taylor and China's Open Century: If I had A Thousand Lives. London: Hodder and Stoughton, 1983
- Alfred Broomhall: Hudson Taylor and China's Open Century: Survivor's Pact. London: Hodder and Stoughton, 1984
- Alfred Broomhall: Hudson Taylor and China’s Open Century, Book Five: Refiner’s Fire. London: Hodder and Stoughton, 1985
- Alfred Broomhall: Hudson Taylor and China's Open Century: Assault On The Nine. London: Hodder and Stoughton, 1986
- Alfred Broomhall: Hudson Taylor and China's Open Century: It Is Not Death To Die. London: Hodder and Stoughton, 1989
- G. Thompson Brown: Earthen Vessels and Transcendent Power: American Presbyterians in China, 1837-1952, Maryknoll NY: Orbis Books, 1997, ISBN 1-57075-150-1
- Cécile og Michel Buerdeley: Giuseppe Castiglione: A Jesuit Painter in the Court of the Chinese Emperors, C.E. Tuttle & Co., 1971, ISBN 0-8048-0987-9
- Stanley M. Burgess: Burgess, Stanley M.; Maas, Eduard M. van der, eds. (2002). "China". The New International Dictionary of Pentecostal and Charismatic Movements (Rev. and exp. ed.). Grand Rapids, Mi: Zondervan. pp. 58–65. ISBN 978-0-310-22481-5.
- Werner Bürklin: Jesus Never Left China: The Rest of the Story: The Untold Story of the Church in China, Enumclaw WA: Pleasant Word, WinePress Publishing, 2006, ISBN 1-4141-0392-1
- Oliver J. Caldwell: «Christian Colleges in China», i Far Eastern Survey, Vol. 11, no. 23 (26. November 1942), s. 236–237
- Arnulf Camps, O.F.M. og Pat McCloskey, O.F.M.: The Friars Minor in China 1294-1955: Especially the Years 1925-55, St. Bonaventure NY: Franciscan Institute, St. Bonaventure University, 1995
- George Candidius: «A short account of the island of Formosa in the Indies, situated near the coast of China...», Awnsham & John Churchill: A collection of voyages and travels, London, 1732
- William Canton: A History of the British and Foreign Bible Society, London, 1904–1910
- Hyginus Eugenius Cardinale: The Holy See and the International Order, Gerrards Cross: Colin Smythe, 1976, ISBN 0-900675-60-8
  - Gustav Carlberg: The Changing China Scene: The Story of the Lutheran Theological Seminary in Its Church and Political Setting Over a Period of Forty-Five Years, 1913-1958, Hong Kong: Lutheran Literature Society, 1958
- Janet Carroll, M.M.: «Ministry of Leadership with Women in China», i Sisters Today, September 1999 Vol. 71 No. 5, s. 323–332
- Janet Carroll, M.M.: «The Church in China», i The Cresset - A Review of Literature, the Arts, and Public Affairs, September 2005 (Vol. LXIX No. 1), s. 20–25, Valparaiso IN: Valparaiso University ISSN 0011-1198
- Frank T. Cartwright: «Protestant Missions in Communist China», i Far Eastern Survey, vol. 18, nr. 26 (28. December 1949), s. 301–305
- Columba Cary-Elwes, O.S.B.: China and the Cross: A Survey of Missionary History, New York: P.J. Kenedy & Sons, 1957
- M. Joseph Castelloe, S.J. (overs., red. og komm.): The Letters and Instructions of Francis Xavier, Anand Gujarat: Gujarat Sahitya Prakash, 1973
- «Catholiques chinois: Une Eglise, ou deux?», i Etudes 366/5 (mai 1987), s. 663–674
  - Caspar Caulfield: Only a Beginning: The Passionists in China, 1921-1931, Union City NJ: Passionist Press, 1990, ISBN 0-9626119-0-5
- Bernardo Cervellera: «Fu Tieshan, "tragic" figure of the Chinese Patriotic Church, dies», i Asianews.it - 25. April 2007. Nettsted besøkt 25. April 2007
- Albert Chan, S.J.: «Michele Ruggeri, S.J. and His Chinese Poems», i Monumenta Serica 41 (1993), s. 129–76
- Kim-Kwong Chan: Towards a Contextual Ecclesiology - The Catholic Church in the People's Republic of China (1979–1983): Its Life and Theological Implications, Hong Kong 1987, ASIN: B000IX69HW
- Jean Charbonnier, M.E.P. (red.): Guide to the Catholic Church in China 2004, China Catholic Communication, Singapore, 2004
- Jonathan Chaves: Singing of the Source: Nature and God in the Poetry of the Chinese Painter Wu Li, Honolulu: University of Hawaii Press, 1993, ISBN 0-8248-1485-1
- Stanislaus Chen: Historia Tentaminium Missionariorum Societatis Jesu pro Liturgia Sinica in Saeculo XVII, doktoravhandling, Roma: Pont. Univers. Urbanianum de Propaganda Fide, 1951
- China News Analysis (1953–1998; Hong Kong til 1994, deretter Taipei) Ukentlig 1953–1978, Annenhver uke 1979–1984, to ggr månedlig 1985–1998. Red. Laszlo Ladany S.J. 1953–1982; Redaksjonskomite pp. Maurice Brosseau S.J., Dominique Tyl S.J., Michel Masson S.J., Yves Nalet S.J. 1983–1998. Utgivelse suspendert noen måneder 1983–1984.
- Peter Chung-hang Chiu: An Historical Study of Nestorian Christianity in the T'ang Dynasty between A.D. 635-846, Doktorsdissertasjon, Southwestern Baptist Theological Seminary, Fort Worth, Texas, 1987
- Anthony E. Clark: China’s Catholics in an Era of Transition : Observations of an “Outsider.”, London: Palgrave Macmillan, 2020
- Anthony E. Clark: China Gothic: The Bishop of Beijing and His Cathedral, Seattle: University of Washington Press, 2019
- Anthony E. Clark (ed.): China’s Christianity: From Missionary to Indigenous Church, Leiden: Brill Press, 2017
- Anthony E. Clark: Heaven in Conflict: Franciscans and the Boxer Uprising in Shanxi, Seattle: University of Washington Press, 2015
- Anthony E. Clark (ed.): A Voluntary Exile: Chinese Christianity and Cultural Confluence since 1552, Bethlehem: Lehigh University Press/Rowman & Littlefield, 2013
- Anthony E. Clark: China’s Saints: Catholic Martyrdom During the Qing (1644-1911), Bethlehem: Lehigh University Press/Rowman & Littlefield, 2011
- Paul Cohen: China and Christianity: The Missionary Movement and the Growth of Chinese Antiforeignism, 1860-1870, Cambridge: Harvard University Press, 1963
- H. M. Cole: «Origins of the French Protectorate Over Catholic Missions in China», i The American Journal of International Law, Vol. 34, nr. 3 (juli 1940), s. 473–491
- Claudia von Collani (utg.): Eine wissenschaftliche Akademit für China. Briefe des Chinamissionars Joachim Bouvet S.J. an Gottfried Wilheim Leibniz und Jean-Paul Bignon über die Erforschung der chinesischen Kultur, Sprache und Geschichte. Studia Leibnitiania, Sonderheft 18. Stuttgart 1989
- Claudia von Collani: Die Figuristen in der Chinamission, Frankfurt a.M., 1981, (Würzburger Sino-Japonica; 8) ISBN 3-8204-6213-9
- Claudia von Collani: P. Joachim Bouvet S.J. - sein Leben und Sein Werk, Nettetal: Steyler Verlag, 1985, ISBN 3-87787-197-6
- Claudia von Collani: «Charles Maigrot's Role in the Chinese Rites Controversy», i D.E. Mungello: The Chinese Rites Controversy: Its History and Meaning, Monumenta Serica Monograph Series, Vol. XXXIII, Nettetal: Steyler Verlag, 1994, ISBN 3-8050-0348-X
- Claudia von Collani: Daoismus und Figurismus zur Inkulturation des Christentums in China, Bern: P. Lang, 1994
- Claudia von Collani: «Martino Martini (1614–1661)», i Roman Malek og Arnold Zingerle (utg.): Martino Martini S.J. (1614–1661) und die Chinamission im 17. Jahrhundert, Nettetal: Steyl, 1996.
- Claudia von Collani: «Tianxue benyi: Joachim Bouvet’s Forschungen zum Monotheismus in China», i China Mission Studies (1550–1800) Bulletin X (1988), s. 9–33
- Claudia von Collani: «SCHALL, Johann Adam S. von Bell, S.J.» i Biographisch-Bibliographisches Kirchenlexikon, Hamm Westf., Band VIII (1994), spaltene 1575–1582, Nettsted sist besøkt 18. juli 2007
- Patrick Connor, S.V.D.: China and the Churches, Techny IL: Steyl Press (Holland), 1981
- Ralph Covell: Pentecost of the Hills in Taiwan: The Christian Faith among the Original Inhabitants, Pasadena CA: Hope Publishing House, 1998, ISBN 0-932727-90-5
- Ralph Covell: The Liberating Gospel in China: The Christian Faith among China's Minority Peoples, Grand Rapids MI: Baker Books, 1995, ISBN 0-8010-2595-8
- Gianni Criveller: «Alessandro Valignano, Founder of the Church in China: The 400th anniversary of his death in Macao in 1606», i Tripod, Spring 2007 Vol. 27 - No. 144, se nettutgave Nettsted besøkt 11. juni 2007
- Gianni Criveller: «Christianity's First Arrival in China», i Tripod, vol. 21, No. 123, Winter 2001 (Hong Kong: Holy Spirit Study Center). Nettsted besøkt 15. mars 2007.
- Gianni Criveller: Preaching Christ in Late Ming China: The Jesuits' Presentation of Christ from Matteo Ricci to Giulio Aleni, Taipei Ricci Institute, Taipei, 1997, ISBN 2-910969-02-9
- Gaspar da Cruz, Tractado em que se cõtam muito por estẽso au cousas da China (Evora, Portugal, 1569); thought to be the first European book with China as the main topic. English translation in: Boxer, Charles Ralph; Pereira, Galeote; Cruz, Gaspar da; Rada, Martín de (1953), South China in the sixteenth century: being the narratives of Galeote Pereira, Fr. Gaspar da Cruz, O.P. [and] Fr. Martín de Rada, O.E.S.A. (1550–1575), Issue 106 of Works issued by the Hakluyt Society, Printed for the Hakluyt Society
- James Sylvester Cummins: A Question of Rites: Friar Domingo Navarrete and the Jesuits in China, Aldershot: Scolar Press, 1993, ISBN 0-85967-880-6
- James Sylvester Cummins: «Two Missionary Methods in China: Mendicants and Jesuits», i Archivio Ibero-Americano - Revista de Estudios Historicos Año XXXVIII (Enero-Diciembre 1978: Número extraordinario con ocasión del IV Centenario de la llegada de los franciscanos a Filipinas 1578-1978: España en Extremo Oriente: Filipinas - Japon - China), s. 33–108
  - Prudencio Damboriena, S.J.: «The Place of Protestant Missions in China», i China Missionary 1948, over tre nummer, No. 1 s. 45–59; No. 2 s. 192–198, og No. 3 s 286–301
  - Prudencio Damboriena, S.J.: Etapas, métodos y resultados de la penetración protestante en China (utgivelse av excerpta fra doktoravhandling), Roma: Pontificia Universitas Gregoriana, 1956
- Jean Dauvillier: «Les provinces chaldéennes 'de l'extérieur' au Moyen Age», i Mélanges offerts à F. Cavallera, Toulouse: Institut catholique de Toulouse, s. 307–310. [Reprodusert i den ferskere Jean Dauvillier: Histoire et institutions des églises orientales au Moyen Age, London: Variorum Reprints, 1983]
- Christopher Dawson: Mission to Asia: Narratives and Letters of the Franciscan Missionaries in Mongolia and China in the Thirteenth and Fourteenth Centuries, New York: Harper & Row, 1966
- Joseph Dehergne: Les chrétientés de Chine de la période Ming (1581–1650), Mon.Ser., 16 (1957), s. 1–136.
- Joseph Dehergne: Répertoire des Jésuites de Chine de 1552 à 1800, Institutum Historicum S.I., Roma, 1973
- William Devine: The Four Churches of Peking, London / Tientsin, 1930
- Mark Dickens: Nestorian Christianity in Central Asia, Mark Dickens, 2001. Nettsted besøkt 9. mars 2007.
- Hugues Didier (overs.): Les portuguais au Tibet: Les premières relations jésuites (1624–1635), Paris: Chandeigne, 1996
- Franco Dimarchi: «Martino Martini und die Chinamission der Jesuiten in 17. Jahrhundert», i Roman Malek og Arnold Zingerle (utg.): Martino Martini S.J. (1614–1661) und die Chinamission im 17. Jahrhundert, 1996, s. 26–48
- Bertha Pinkham Dixon: A Romance of Faith, Los Angeles, 1941.
- Angelyn Dries, O.S.F.: The Missionary Movement in American Catholic History, Maryknoll NY: Orbis Books, 1998, ISBN 1-57075-167-6
- Joseph Duhergne, S.J.: «La Mission de Pékin a la Veille de la Condamnation des Rites», i Neue Zeitschrift für Missionswissenschaft, Vol. IX (1953), Heft 2, s. 91–106
- George H. Dunne, S.J.: Generation of Giants: The Story of the Jesuits in China in the Last Decades of the Ming Dynasty, Notre Dame: University of Notre Dame Press, 1962, ISBN 1-4254-4427-X
- A.B. Duvigneau, C.M.: «S. Thomas a-t-il porté 'Évangile jusqu'en Chine?», i Bulletin catholique de Pekin, Juin-Octobre 1936.
- Pierre Duviols: La lutte contre les religions autochthones dans le Pérou colonial: 'l'extirpation de l'idolâtrie,' entre 1532 et 1660, Lima: Institut français d'études andines, 1971, s. 339
- Irene Eber: The Jewish Bishop and the Chinese Bible: S.I.J. Schereschewsky (1831–1906), i serien "Studies in Christian Mission", Leiden: Brill, 1999
- Irene Eber, Sze-kar Wan, Knut Walf (red.): Bible in Modern China: The Literary and Intellectual Impact, Monumenta Serica Monograph series XLIII, Sankt Augustin: Monumenta Serica, 1999
- E.H. Edwards: Fire and Sword in Shansi: The Story of the Martyrdom of Foreigners and Chinese Christians, New York: Ayer Co Pub, 1970, ISBN 0-405-02014-7
- Robert E. Entenmann: «Christian Virgins in Eighteenth-Century Sichuan», i Christianity in China (1996)
- «Catholiques chinois: Une Eglise, ou deux?», i Etudes 366/5 (mai 1987), s. 663–674
- Georg Evers: «Die Rolle der christlichen Mission als Werkzeug gesellschäftlicher und kultureller Veränderung am Beispiel Chinas», i Roman Malek (red.): «Fallbeispiel» China: Ökumenische Beiträge zu Religion, Theologie und Kirche im Chinesischen Kontext, Nettetal: Steyler Verlag, 1996, s. 186–208
- Peter W. Fay: «The French Catholic Mission in China during the Opium War», i Modern Asian Studies, Vol. 4, nr. 2 (1970), s. 115–128.
- Peter W. Fay: «The Protestant Mission and the Opium War», i The Pacific Historical Review, Vol. 40, nr. 2 (mai 1971), s. 145–161
- Peter W. Fay: The Opium War 1840-1842: Barbarians in the Celestin Empire in the Early Part of the Nineteenth Century and the War by Which They Forced Her Gates Ajar, Chapel Hill: University of North Carolina Press, 1975, ISBN 0-8078-1243-9
- Gerolamo Fazzini: Il libro rosso dei martiri cinesi. Testimonianze e resoconti autobiografici, Edizioni San Paolo, Cinisello Balsamo, 2006
- Johan Ferreira, Early Chinese Christianity: The Tang Christian Monument and Other Documents, Strathfield, NSW: St Pauls Publications, 2014
- Caroline Fielder: The Growth of the Protestant Church in China. Dokument presentert for 21st National Catholic China Conference i Seattle i USA i juli 2005. nettsted besøkt 6. mai 2007.
- Filippo De Filippi (red.): An Account of Tibet: The Travels of Ippolito Desideri of Pistoia, S.J., London: Routledge, 1932
- Maria Elizabeth Xara Brazil Fongen: Returning Macao to the Chinese: An Historical Overview of Cultural Interaction between Portugal and China with special Reference to Religion and Literature, Hovedfagsoppgave, Universitetet i Oslo, 1993
- Antonio Forte: «The Edict of 638 Allowing the Diffusion of Christianity in China, i Paul Pelliot (red.): L'Inscription Nestorienne de Si-ngan-fou, Kyoti: Scuola de studi sull'Asia Orientale; Paris: Collège de France, Institut des Hautes Êtudes Chinoises, 1996, s. 349-373
- John Foster: The Church of the T'ang Dynasty, London: SPCK, 1939
- Louis Gaillard, S.J.: Croix et swastika en Chine, Shanghai: Imprimerie de la Mission Catholique, 1893
- Jacques Gernet: Chine et christianisme. Action et réaction, Paris: Gallimard, 1982; oversatt til engelsk av Janet Lloyd: China and the Christian Impact, Cambridge: Cambridge University Press, 1985, ISBN 0-521-26681-5; verket nyredigert i 1991 med ny tittel Chine et christianisme. La première confrontation.
- Ian Gillman & Hans-Joachim Klimkeit: Christians in Asia before 1500, Richmond Surrey: Curzon, 1999, ISBN 0-7007-1022-1
- Josef Glazik: Die Russisch-Orthodoxe Heidenmission seit Peter dem Großen, Münster: Aschendorff, 1954
- Noël Golvers: «Le rôle de la femme dans la mission catholique au dix-septième siècle au Jiangnan: Philippe Couplet et sa biographie de Candida Xu (1607–1680)» i Verbiest Courrier 10, (June 1998)
- Noël Golvers: François de Rougemont, S.J.: Missionary in Ch'ang-shu (Chiang-nan), Leuven: Leuven University Press, 1999, ISBN 90-5867-001-5
- Theodor Grentrup SVD: The Missionary Problems of China. In the Light of their most recent development, in The Ecclesiastical Review (= EcR) 88 (1933) 351–368.
- Wolfgang L. Griching: The Value System in China 1970, Taipei: Bethlehem Fathers, 1971
- Angelus Francis J. Grosse-Aschhoff: The Negotiations between Ch'i-Ying and Lagrené, 1844-1846, St. Bonaventure (New York): Franciscan Institute, 1950
- Noël Gubbels: Trois Siècles d'Apostolat: Histoire du Catholicisme de Hu-kwang depuis les origines 1587 jusqu'à 1870, Wuchang/Paris: Franciscan Press, 1934
- Pierfilippo Guglielminetti: «One Church, Two Testimonies», i Tripod 1987, No. 37, s. 76–88
- Hang Song-Kang: «Kangxi's Attitude in the Rites Controversy», i The Heythrop Journal (Vol. XXVIII Nr. 1) January 1987, s. 57–67
- Thaddäus Hang: Die katholische Kirche im chinesischen Raum: Geschichte und Gegenwart, München: Verlag Anton Pustet, 1963
- Eric Osborne Hanson: The Chinese State and the Catholic Church: The Politics of Religion within the Confucian-Sectarian Dynamic, doktorarbeid, Stanford: Stanford University, 1976
- Eric Osborne Hanson: Catholic politics in China and Korea, Maryknoll: Orbis Books, 1980, ISBN 0-88344-084-9
- Eric Osborne Hanson: «Political Aspects of Chinese Catholicism», i Whitehead (red): China and Christianity, Historican and Future Encounters, Notre Dame (Indiana) 1979
- Ernst Harbakk: «Misjon og Kirke i Kina», i Missiologi i dag (red. Jan-Martin Berentsen, Tormod Engelsviken, Knud Jørgensen), 2. utg., 2004, ISBN 82-15-00621-3
- Paul Hattaway: China's Christian Martyrs, Oxford:Monarch Books, 2007, ISBN 978-1-85424-762-9
- Malcolm Hay: Failure in the Far East, London: Neville Spearman 1956
- Hermann Herbst: Der Bericht des Franziskaners Wilhelm von Rubruck über seine Reise in das innere Asiens in den Jahren 1253-1255, Leipzig, 1925
- Jeroom Heyndrickx, C.I.C.M.: «Emergence of a Local Catholic Church in China?», i Tripod 1987, No. 37, s. 51–75
- Jeroom Heyndrickx, C.I.C.M. (red.): Historiography of the Chinese Catholic Church: Nineteenth and Twentieth Centuries, Leuven: Ferdinand Verbiest Foundation, 1994
- Jeroom Heyndrickx, C.I.C.M.: «Why China snubbed the Vatican», i The Tablet 15 January 2000, se søk etter tittelen, Nettsted sist besøkt 6. mai 2007.
- Jeroom Heyndrickx, C.I.C.M.: Confrontation and Lack of dialogue cause A new China-Vatican conflict, 2006, Nettsted sist besøkt 16. juli 2007
- Thorstein Himle: Guds Veje Med et gjenstridig Folk: En historisk Beretning, Red Wing, Minnesota: Kinamissionsbestyrelsen, 1902
- Thorstein Himle (red.): Evangeliets Seier: Festskrift for Hauge Synode Kinamissions 25 Aars Jubilæum, Minneapolis, Minnesota: Hauge's Norwegian Evangelical Lutheran Synod, 1916
- George Hood: Neither Bang nor Whimper: The End of a Missionary Era in China, Singapore: The Presbyterian Church in Singapore, 1991 ISBN 981-00-2837-7
- Bianca Horlemann: The Divine Word Missionaries in Gansu, Qinghai and Xinjiang, 1922–1953: A Bibliographic Note. In: Journal of the Royal Asiatic Society (Third Series) / Vol. 19 / Issue 01 / January 2009, 59–82.
- Andrew Hsiao: A Brief History of the Chinese Lutheran Church, Hong Kong: Taosheng Publishing House, 1999, ISBN 962-380-107-6
- Paulos Z. Huang: Daguoxue shiye zhong de hanyu xueshu shengjing xue (Sino-Christian Academic Biblical Studies in the Light of Global Great National Studies) Beijing: Ethnic Press, 2012.
- Paulos Z. Huang: Daguoxue shiye zhong de hanyu xueshu duihua shenxue (Sino-Christian Dialogical Theology in the Light of Global Great National Studies), Beijing: Ethnic Press, 2011.
- Paulos Z. Huang:Confronting the Confucian Understandings of the Christian Doctrine of Salvation ---- A systematic theological analysis of the basic problems in the Confucian-Christian dialogue. 2010, Leiden & Boston: Brill, pp. xiii + 319.
- Paulos Z. Huang & Miikka Ruokanen (editors-in-Chief): Christianity and Chinese Culture. 2010, USA, MI, Grand Rapids: Eerdmans Publishing Company, USA, pp. 408.
- Paulos Z. Huang:Rujia, Jidu zongjiao yu jiushu (Confucianism, Christianity and Salvation), 2009, Beijing: Religion & Culture Press, pp. 521.
- Paulos Z. Huang:Hanyu xueshu shenxue ---- Zuowei xueke tixi de jidujiao yanjiu (Sino-Christian Academic Theology ---- The Study of Christianity as an Academic Discipline), 2008, Beijing: Religion & Culture Press, pp. 563.
- Paulos Z. Huang & Miikka Ruokanen (editors-in-Chief): Jidu zongjiao yu zhongguo wenhua ---- Guanyu chujing shenxue de Zhongguo – Beiou huiyi lunwenji (Christianity and Chinese Culture ---- Conference Presentations and Responses from the International Conference concerning Chinese-Nordic Contextual Theology). 2004, Beijing: Zhongguo shehui kexue chubanshe (China Social Sciences Press), pp. 352.
- Xiaojuan Huang: Christian Communication and Alternative Devotions in China, 1780-1860, 2006
- Harrie Huiskamp: A Genealogy of Ecclesiastical Jurisdictions: Schematic Outline, Illustrating the Development of the Catholic Church in Territories Assigned to Portugal by Treaty of Tordesillas in 1494 (KTC - Kerk en theologie in context), Kampen: Uitgiverij Kok, 1994, ISBN 90-390-0502-8
- Alan Hunter & Kim-Kwong Chan: Protestantism in Contemporary China, Cambridge University Press, 2004, ISBN 0-521-44161-7
- Anton Huonder, S.J.: Der einheimische Klerus in den Heidenländern, Freiburg, 1909
- Dale T. Ivin og Scott W. Sunquist: History of the World Christian Movement, bind I, Earliest Christianity to 1453, Maryknoll NY: Orbis Books, 2001, ISBN 1-57075-396-2
- Robert Charles Jenkins: The Jesuits in China and the Legation of Cardinal de Tournon: An examination of Conflicting Evidence and an Attempt at an Impartial Judgement, London 1984, faksimile opptrykk av «Elibrion Classics», 2005. ISBN 1-4021-7545-0
- Léon Joly: Le Christianisme et l'Éxtrême Orient, Bind 1, Paris, 1908
- Francis P. Jones (red.): Documents of the Three-Self Movement: Source Materials for the Study of the Protestant Church in Communist China, New York: National Council of the Churches of Christ in the US, 1963
  - Torstein Jørgensen (red.): I tro og tjeneste: Det Norske Misjonsselskap 1842-1992, bind I, Stavanger: Misjonshøgskolen, 1992, ISBN 82-7219-078-8
  - Jason Kindopp & Carol Lee Hamrin (red.): God and Caesar in China: Policy Implications of Church-State Tensions, Washington DC: The Brookings Institution, 2004 ISBN 0-8157-4936-8
- Jason Kindopp: Fragmented but Defiant: Protestant Resilience under CCP Rule, i Jason Kindopp & Carol Lee Hamrin (red.): God and Caesar in China: Policy Implications of Church-State Tensions, Washington DC: The Brookings Institution, 2004, s. 122–145, ISBN 0-8157-4936-8
- Geoffrey King, S.J.: «Die katholische Kirche in China: Eine kirchenrechtliche Bewertung», i Roman Malek, S.V.D. (red.): «Fallbeispiel» China: Ökumenische Beiträge zu Religion, Theologie und Kirche im Chinesischen Kontext, Nettetal: Steyler Verlag, 1996, s. 581–610, ISBN 3-8050-0385-4
- Sr. Maria Ko, F.M.A.: «The Bible in China», i Tripod, Spring 2007 Vol. 27 - No. 144, se nettutgave Nettsted besøkt 11. juni 2007
- Miroslav Kollar: Ein Leben im Konflikt. P. Franz Xaver Biallas SVD (1878-1936). Chinamissionar und Sinologe im Licht seiner Korrespondenz. Monumenta Serica Institute, Sankt Augustin - Steyler Verlag, Nettetal 2011, viii, 910 S., ISBN 978-3-8050-0579-1
- Ku Wei-ying og Koen DeRidder (red.): Authentic Chinese Christianity: Preludes to its Development (19th and 20th Centuries), Leuven: Ferdinand Verbiest Foundation - Leuven University Press, 2001, ISBN 90-5867-102-X
- Lars Petter Laamann: Christian Heretics in Late Imperial China: Christian Inculturation and State Control, 1720-1850, London & New York: Routledge, 2006, ISBN 0-415-29779-6
- Creighton Lacy: «The Missionary Exodus from China», i Pacific Affairs, Vol. 28, No. 4 (December 1955), s. 301–314
- Laszlo Ladany, S.J.: The Catholic Church in China, New York: Freedom House, 1987
- John T.P. Lai: Negotiating Religious Gaps. The Enterprise of Translating Christian Tracts by Protestant Missionaries in Nineteenth-Century China. Monumenta Serica Institute, Steyler Verlag, Sankt Augustin, 2012 xvi, 382 pp., ISBN 978-3-8050-0597-5
- Anthony S.K. Lam: The Catholic Church in Present-Day China: Through Darkness and Light, Holy Spirit Study Centre, Hong Kong, 1997, ISBN 962-85140-2-4
- Anthony S.K. Lam: Decades of Vacillation: Chinese Communist Religious Policy and Its Implementation, Holy Spirit Study Centre, Hong Kong, 2003, ISBN 962-86367-3-1
- Tony Lambert: «Counting Christians in China: A Cautionary Report» i International Bulletin of Missionary Research 1/1/2003
- Kenneth Scott Latourette: «Roman Catholic and Protestant Missions in China: Some Comparisons», i The International Review of Missions, 1926, s. 161–181
- Kenneth Scott Latourette: A History of Christian Missions in China, London, 1929
- Kenneth Scott Latourette: «Problems Confronting Christian Missions in the Far East», i Pacific Affairs, Vol. 21, nr. 2 (juni 1948), s. 176–185
- Kenneth Scott Latourette: Book Review of Columba Cary-Elwes' "China and the Cross: A Survey of Missionar Activities", i The Journal of Asian Studies, Vol. 17, No. 2 (February 1958), s. 272–273
- Angelo S. Lazzarotto: La Chiesa cattolica in Cina, la "politica di libertà, Milano, 1982 (engelsk: The Catholic Church in Post-Mao China, Holy Spirit Study Centre, Hong Kong, 1982)
- Stephen Lee: «Die katholische Kirche in China: Eine kirchenrechtliche Bewertung - Entgegnung auf den Artikel von Geoffrey King», i Roman Malek, S.V.D. (red.): «Fallbeispiel» China: Ökumenische Beiträge zu Religion, Theologie und Kirche im Chinesischen Kontext, Nettetal: Steyler Verlag, 1996, s. 611–626, ISBN 3-8050-0385-4
- François-Xavier Legrand: The Intellectual Apostolate in China, Hong Kong: The Catholic Truth Society, 1949
- Donald Daniel Leslie: The Survival of the Chinese Jews: The Jewish Community in Kaifeng, Leiden: E.J.Brill, 1972, ISBN 90-04-03413-7
- Beatrice K.F. Leung: Sino-Vatican Relations: Problems in conflicting authority 1976-1986, New York: Cambridge University Press, 1992, ISBN 0-521-38173-8
- Beatrice K.F. Leung and John D. Young (ed.): Christianity in China: Foundations for Dialogue, Hong Kong: Centre for Asian Studies, The University of Hong Kong, 1993, ISSN 0378-2689
- Beatrice K.F. Leung and Joseph Cheng (ed.): Hong Kong SAR: In Pursuit of Domestic and International Order, Hong Kong: Chinese University Press, 1997
- Beatrice K.F. Leung: «The Uneasy Balance: The Sino-Vatican-Hong Kong relations after 1997», i Beatrice Leung og Joseph Cheng (red.): Hong Kong SAR: In Pursuit of Domestic and International Order, Hong Kong: Chinese University Press, 1997, s. 97–117
- Beatrice K.F. Leung: «Catholic Bridging Efforts with China», i Religion, State & Society, Vol. 28, No. 2, 2000, s. 185–195
- Beatrice K.F. Leung og William T. Liu: The Chinese Catholic Church in Conflict: 1949-2001, Boca Raton FL: Universal Publishers, 2004, ISBN 1-58112-514-3
- Li Tang: A Study of the History of Nestorian Christianity in China and Its Literature in Chinese: Together With a New English Translation of the Dunhuang Nestorian Documents, Peter Lang Publishing, 2003 paperback: ISBN 0-8204-5970-4.
  - Lian Xi: The Conversion of Missionaries: Liberalism in American Protestant Missions in China, 1907-1932, University Park: Pennsylvania University Press, 1977
  - Liu Cixin: «Die Protestantische Antwort auf die 4. Mai-Bewegung», i Roman Malek (red.): «Fallbeispiel» China: Ökumenische Beiträge zu Religion, Theologie und Kirche im Chinesischen Kontext, Nettetal: Steyler Verlag, 1996, s. 159–164
- Anders Ljungstedt: An Historical Sketch of the Portuguese Settlements in China: And of the Roman Catholic Church and Mission in China. A Supplementary Chapter, Description of the City of Canton, Boston 1836 - Faksimileopptrykk Adamant Media Corporation, 2004, ISBN 0-543-97025-6
- Kathleen L. Lodwick: Crusaders against Opium: Protestant Missionaries in China, 1874-1917, Lexington KY: University Press of Kentucky 1996
- Michael Loewe: «Imperial China's Reactions to the Catholic Missions», i Numen, Vol. 35, fasc. 2 (December 1988), s. 179–212
- Kam Louie: Review of Irene Eber, Sze-kar Wan, Knut Walf (red.): "Bible in Modern China: The Literary and Intellectual Impact", i The China Quarterly, No. 163 (Sep., 2000), s. 874–875
- Augusto Luca: Nel Tibet Ignoto: Lo straordinario viaggio di Ippolito Desideri S.J. (1684–1733), Bologna: EMI, 1987, ISBN 88-307-0125-4
  - Jessie Gregory Lutz: Chinese Politics and Christian Missions: The Anti-Christian Movements of 1920-28, Cross Cultural Publications, Notre Dame (Indiana), 1988, ISBN 0-940121-05-0
  - Jessie Gregory Lutz: Mission Dilemmas: Bride Price, Minor Marriage, Concubinage, Infanticide, and Education of Women, New Haven, CT: Yale Divinity School Library, 2002
- Otto Maas: Die Wiederöffning der Franziskanermission in China in der Neuzeit, Münster, 1926
- Otto Maas: «Die Franziskanermission in China des XVIII. Jahrhunderts», i Zeitschrift für Missionswissenschaft 21 (1931)
  - Donald McGillivray (red.): A Century of Protestant Missions in China (1807–1907), Shanghai: American Presbyterian Mission Press, 1907, nyopptrykk, USA: Elibron Classics, 2002, ISBN 978-1-4021-6031-8
- Richard Madsen: «The Catholic Church in China: Cultural Contradictions, Institutional Survival, and Religious Renewal», i Unofficial China: Popular Culture and Thought in the People's Republic (red. av P. Link), Boulder: Westlink, 1989
- Richard Madsen: China's Catholics: Tragedy and Hope in an Emerging Civil Society, Berkeley and Los Angeles: University of California Press Berkeley and Los Angeles, 1998, ISBN 0-520-21326-2
- Irene Mahoney, O.S.U.: Swatow: Ursulines in China, New Rochelle, NY: Ursuline Sisters, 2006
- Roman Malek, S.V.D. og Arnold Zingerle (utg.): Martino Martini S.J. (1614–1661) und die Chinamission im 17. Jahrhundert, Nettetal: Steyl, 1996, ISBN 3-8050-0444-3
- Roman Malek, S.V.D. (red.): Western Learning and Christianity in China: The Contribution and Impact of Johann Adam Schall von Bell, S.J. (1592–1666) 1 (Monumenta Serica Monograph Series XXXV/1), Nettetal: Steyler Verlag, 1998
- Roman Malek, S.V.D. (red.): The Chinese Face of Jesus Christ, St. Augustin: Institut Monumenta Serica/China-Zentrum, 2002, ISBN 3-8050-0524-5
- Roman Malek, S.V.D. (red.): «Fallbeispiel» China: Ökumenische Beiträge zu Religion, Theologie und Kirche im Chinesischen Kontext, Nettetal: Steyler Verlag, 1996, ISBN 3-8050-0385-4
- Roman Malek, S.V.D. og Werner Prawdzik, S.V.D. (red.): Zwischen Autonomie und Anlehnung: Die Problematik der katholischen Kirche in China, theologisch und geschichtlich gesehen, Nettetal: Steyler Verlag, 1989, s. 121–131, ISBN 3-8050-0385-4
- Roman Malek (Ed.): Jingjiao. The Church of the East in China and Central Asia, Monumenta Serica Institute, Sankt Augustin - Steyler Verlag, Nettetal 2006, 701 pp., Illus., ISBN 3-8050-0534-2
- Sr. Raffaela Mantovanelli: Women: Half of Heaven also in the Church, i European Ecumenical China Communication, no. 5, s. 67–73
- B. Martínez: Historia de las misiones augustinianas en China, Madrid, 1918
- Federico Masini (red.): Western Humanistic Culture Presented to China by Jesuit Missionaries (XVII-XVIII Centuries) - Proceedings of the Conference held in Roma, October 25–27, 1993, Roma: Institutum Historicum S.I., 1996, ISBN 88-7041-346-2
- John W. Masland: «Communism and Christianity in China», i The Journal of Religion, Vol. 32, nr. 3, (juli 1952), s. 198–206
- Giorgio Melis (red.): Martino Martini: Geografo, Cartografo, Storico, Teologo: Atti del Convegno Internazionale, Trento, 1983.
- Giorgio Melis: «Martino Martini's Travels in China», i G. Melis (red.): Martino Martini: Geografo, Cartografo, Storico, Teologo: Atti del Convegno Internazionale, Trento, 1983, s. 429–430.
- Pierre Xavier Mertens, S.J.: Du sang chrétien sur le fleuve jaune, Paris: Editions Spes 1937 (engelsk: The Yellow River runs Red: A story of Modern Chinese Martyrs, London, 1939 ASIN: B00086CBKI)
- Giuseppe Messina: «Cristianesimo, buddhismo, manicheismo nell'Asia antica», i Artibus Asiae, vol. 10, No. 4 (1947), Roma
- Thierry Meynard, S.J.: Following the Footsteps of the Jesuits in Beijing, Saint Louis, MO: The Institute of Jesuit Studies, 2006, ISBN 1-880810-66-2
- Thierry Meynard, S.J.: «Christianity, State and Civil Society in Today's China», i The Ricci Bulletin, Taipei Ricci Institute, 2005, s. 19–30
- George Minamiki, S.J.: The Chinese rites controversy from its beginning to modern times. Chicago: Loyola University Press, 1985, ISBN 0-8294-0457-0
- Alphonse Mingana: «The Early Spread of Christianity in Central Asia and the Far East», i Bulletin of the John Rylands University Library 9, (1925), s. 279–371
- Adam Minter: «Keeping Faith», i The Atlantic Monthly, juli/August 2007. Nettsted sist besøkt 17. September 2007
- Samuel Hugh Moffett: A History of Christianity in Asia: Beginnings to 1500 (bind I), 2. utg., New York, 1998, ISBN 978-1-57075-162-2
- Samuel Hugh Moffett: A History of Christianity in Asia: 1500 - 1900 (Bind II) New York, 2005, ISBN 1-57075-450-0
- Jean Monsterleet: Les martyrs de Chine parlent, Paris: Amiot-Dupont, 1953 (engelsk oversettelse: Martyrs in China, Chicago 1956)
- Francisco Javier Montalban, S.J.: Das Spanische Patronat und die Eroberung der Philippinen, Freiburg i.Br.: Herder & Co., 1930
- Thomas Moore og Ray Riegert (red.): The Lost Sutras of Jesus: Unlocking the Ancient Wisdom of the Xian Monks, Seastone, 2003, ISBN 1-56975-360-1
- Arthur C. Moule: Christians in China before the year 1550, London, 1930
- Arthur C. Moule: Nestorians in China: Some Corrections and Additions, London: The China Society, 1940
- David E. Mungello: Curious Land: Jesuit Accommodation and the Origins of Sinology. Stuttgart, Germany: Franz Steiner Verlag, 1984. 405 p. Paperback edition: Honolulu: University of Hawaii Press, 1989.
- David E. Mungello: Great Encounter of China and the West, 1500-1800, Rowman & Littlefield Publishers, Inc.; 2nd edition (April 28, 2005), ISBN 978-0-7425-3814-6
- David E. Mungello: The forgotten Christians of Hangzhou, Honolulu: University of Hawaii Press, 1994, ISBN 0-8248-1540-8
- David E. Mungello (red.): The Rites Controversy: Its History and Meaning, Nettetal: Steyler Verlag, 1994, ISBN 3-8050-0348-X
- James T. Myers: Enemies Without Guns: The Catholic Church in The People's Republic of China, New York, 1991, ISBN 0-943852-91-9
- Martin Palmer: The Jesus Sutras: Rediscovering the Lost Scrolls of Taoist Christianity, Wellspring/Ballantine, 2001, ISBN 0-345-43424-2. Texts translated by Palmer, Eva Wong, and L. Rong Rong.
- Paul Pelliot: «Recherches sur les chrétiens d'Asie centrale et d'Extrême-Orient», vol. II/1 «La stèle de Si-ngan-fou», i Ouvres posthumes de Paul Pelliot éditées par la fondation Singer-Polignac, présentées et commentées par J- Dauvillier Paris: Imprimerie Nationale, 1984
- Paul Pelliot: L'Inscription nestorienne de Si-ngan-fou (Edited with Supplements by Antonino Forte), Kyoto: Scuola di Studi sull'Asia Orientale & Paris: Collège de France/Institut des Hautes Etudes Chinoises, 1996
- Jean-Marie Planchet, C.M.: Le Cimetière et Les Oevres Catholiques de Chala 1610-1927, Pékin:Imprimerie des Lazaristes, 1928
- Felix A. Plattner: Jesuiten zur See, Zürich, 1946 [Engelsk oversettelse: Jesuits go East, Dublin: Clonmore and Reynolds, 1950]
- Fortunato Prandi (overs. og red): Matteo Ripa: Memoirs of Father Ripa, during Thirteen Years' Residence at the Court of Peking in the Service of the Emperor of China. With an account of the foundation of the college for the education of young Chinese at Naples. Oversettelse fra italiensk, Elibron Classics, faksimile fra 2002, ISBN 1-4021-8880-3 (Den tidligste engelskspråklige utgave av memoarene er fra 1844 i London, ved John Murray).
  - Mary Carita Pendergast, S.C.: Havoc in Hunan: The Sisters of Charity in Western Hunan 1924-1954, Convent Station N.J.: College of St. Elizabeth Press, 1993
- Igor de Rachewiltz: Papal Envoys to the Great Khans, Stanford: Stanford University Press, 1971, ISBN 0-8047-0770-7
- Pierre Perrier: Kong Wang Shan - L'Apôtre Thomas et le prince Ying, Éditions du Jubilé, 2012,ISBN 978-2866795481
- António da Silva Rego: O Padroado Portugues do Oriente, Divisão de Publicações e Biblioteca, Agência Geral des Colónias, 1940
- António da Silva Rego (red.): Documentacão para Historia das Missoes do Padroado Portugues do Oriente, Bd. I-VI, Goa, 1949–1951
- Sebald Reil: Kilian Stumpf 1655-1720: Ein Würzburger Jesuit am Kaiserhof zu Peking, Münster: Aschendorff, 1977 og 2001, ISBN 3-402-03522-7
- Thomas L. Reilly (red.): Letters from China [1923–1953], Franciscan Missionary Union of Holy Name Province, New Jersey, 1992
- Ricci Roundtable on the History of Christianity in China Archived 2007-06-11 at the Wayback Machine. Nettsted besøkt 10. juni 2007.
- Eric Reinders: «The Iconoclasm of Obeiance: Protestant Images of Chinese Religion and the Catholic Church», i Numen, Vol. 44, no. 3, Leiden:Brill, 1997, s. 296–322
- Karl Josef Rivinius, S.V.D.: Weltlicher Schutz und Mission: Das deutsche Protektorat über die katholische Mission von Süd-Shantung, (Bonner Beiträge zur Kirchengeschichte, Bd. 14), Köln/Wien: Böhlau Verlag, 1987, ISBN 3-412-00987-3
- Karl Josef Rivinius, S.V.D. (1992). "Lebbe, Frédéric Vincent - chinesisch: Lei Mingyuan". In Bautz, Traugott (ed.). Biographisch-Bibliographisches Kirchenlexikon (BBKL) (in German). Vol. 4. Herzberg: Bautz. cols. 1291–1296. ISBN 3-88309-038-7.
- Karl Josef Rivinius SVD: Das Projekt einer Katholischen Enzyklopädie für China. Studia Instituti Missiologici Societatis Verbi Divini 99, Steyler Verlag: Nettetal 2013, 478 S., ISBN 978-3-8050-0609-5
- Antonio Sisto Rosso, O.F.M.: Apostolic Legations in China of the Eighteenth Century, South Pasadena: P.D. and I. Perkins, 1948
- Charles E. Ronan, S.J. og Bonnie B. C. Oh (red.): East Meets West: The Jesuits in China, Chicago, 1988, ISBN 0-8294-0572-0
- Antonio Sisto Rosso, O.F.M.: Apostolic Legations to China in the Eighteenth Century, South Pasadena: Perkins, 1948
- Francis A. Rouleau, S.J.: «Chinese Rites Controversy», i New Catholic Encyclopedia, Washington DC, vol. III, 1967, kol. 610–617
- Francis A. Rouleau, S.J.: «Maillard de Tournon, Papal Legate at the Court of Pekin», i Archivum Historicum Societatis Jesu, vol. 31, Roma, 1962
- Arnold H. Rowbotham: Missionary and Mandarin: The Jesuits at the Court of China, Berkeley: University of California Press, 1942
- Murray A. Rubinstein: The Origins of the Anglo-American Enterprise in China, 1807-1840, Lanham MD: American Theological Library Association Monograph Series 33, 1996, ISBN 0-8108-2770-0
- Michele Ruggieri, S.J., Matteo Ricci, S.J., John W. Witek, S.J.: Dicionário Português-Chinês : 葡漢詞典 (Pu-Han Cidian) : Portuguese-Chinese dictionary, Biblioteca Nacional, 2001, ISBN 972-565-298-3 (Detailed account of the Jesuits' early years in China)
- Paul A. Rule: K'ung-tzu or Confucius? The Jesuit Interpretation of Confucianism, doktorarbeid, London: Unwin Hyman, 1972, ISBN 0-86861-913-2
- Paul A. Rule: «Louis Fan Shou-i: A Missing Link in the Chinese Rites Controversy», i Actes du VIIe colloque occidental de sinologie, Chantilly 1992: Images de la Chine: Échanges culturels et religieux entre la Chine et l'Occident (Var.Sin., 83), Taipei: Ricci Institute, 1995
- P.Y. Saeki: The Nestorian Monument in China, London: Society for Promoting Christian Knowledge, 1915
- Adam Schall: Historica relatio de ortu et progressu fidei orthodoxæ in regno Chinensi, Regensburg, 1672 (en bearbeidelse på grunnlag av Schalls brev)
- Kristofer Schipper: «Some Naive Questions About the Rites Controversy», i Federico Masini (red.): Western Humanistic Culture presented to China by Jesuit Missionaries (XVII-XVIII Centuries): Proceedings of the Conference held in Rome, October 25–27, 1993, Roma: Institutum Historicum S.I., 1996, s. 293–308
- Georg Schurhammer, S.J. og Joseph Wicki, S.J.: Epistolae S. Francisci Xaverii, Roma, 1944
- Josef Franz Schütte, S.J.: Il ceremoniale per i missionari del Giappone, Roma, 1946
- Josef Franz Schutte, S.J.: Valignano’s Mission Principles for Japan, St. Louis: Institute of Jesuit Sources, 1980, s. 1/2:155-190
- Joseph S. Sebes, S.J.: «Martino Martini's Role in the Controversy of the Chinese Rites», i G. Melis (red.): Martino Martini, Geografo, Storico, Teologo: Atti del Convegno Internationale, Trento, 1983
- Joseph S. Sebes, S.J.: «The Jesuits and the Sino-Russian Treaty of Nerchinsk (1689): The Diary of Thomas Pereira», i Bibliotheca Instituti Historici S.I.; V. 18. Rome: Institutum Historicum S.I., 1962
- Nathan Sivin: «Copernicus in China», i Polish Academy of Sciences (red.): Studia Copernicana, bind 6, Warszawa: Institute for the History of Science, 1973
- Nathan Sivin: Science in Ancient China: Researches and Reflections, Aldershot: Variorum, 1995, ISBN 0-86078-492-4
- Gang Song: Giulio Aleni, Kouduo richao, and Christian–Confucian Dialogism in Late Ming Fujian. Monumenta Serica Monograph Series 69, Abingdon, Oxon: Routledge, 418 pp., ISBN 9781-1385-8912-4
- Jonathan D. Spence: God's Chinese Son: The Taiping Heavenly Kingdom of Hong Xiuquan, New York: W.W.Norton, 1996, ISBN 0-00-255584-0
- Nicolas Standaert, S.J. (red): Handbook of Christianity in China - Volume One: 635-1800, Brill, Leiden, 2001, ISBN 90-04-11431-9
- Nicolas Standaert, S.J.: «Inculturation and Chinese-Christian Contacts in the Late Ming and Early Qing», i Ching Feng 34 (4) (December 1991), s. 1–16
- Nicolas Standaert, S.J.: «The Jesuits did NOT Manufacture Confucianism», i East Asian Science, Technology and Medicine 164 (1999), s. 115–132
- Chloe Starr: Chinese Theology: Text and Context, New Haven, CT: Yale University Press, 2016, ISBN 978-0-300-20421-6
- Frode Steen: «Taiwan», i Arne Tolo (red.:) Såtid, vekst og modning: Historien om Norsk Luthersk Misjonssambands arbeid i Asia, Afrika og Sør-Amerika, Oslo: Lunde Forlag, 2002 ISBN 82-520-3549-3, s. 153–168
- Paul B. Steffen, Witness and Holiness, the Heart of the Life of Saint Joseph Freinademetz of Shandong, in: Studia Missionalia 61 (Roma 2012) 257–392, ISBN 978-88-7839-225-0.
- Donald F. St. Sure (oversetter): 100 Roman Documents Concerning the Chinese Rites Controversy (1645–1941) (redigert av R.R. Noll), San Francisco: Ricci Institute, 1992
- Milton Theobald Stauffer, Tsinforn C. Wong, M. Gardner Tewksbury (red.): The Christian Occupation of China: A General Survey of the Numerical Strength and Geographical Distribution of the Christian Forces in China, Made by the Special Committee on Survey and Occupation, China Continuation Committee, 1918-1921, Shanghai: China Continuation Committee, 1922
- Scott W. Sunquist, David Wu Chu Sing og John Chew Hiang Chea: A Dictionary of Asian Christianity, Grand Rapids, MI:Wm. B. Eerdmans Publishing Co., 2001, ISBN 0-8028-3776-X
- Rolf Arthur Syrdal: American Lutheran Missionary Work in China, doktoravhandling, Madison, NJ: Drew University, 1942
- Edmond Tang og Jean-Paul Wiest (redaktører): The Catholic Church in Modern China, Maryknoll: Orbis Books, 1993, ISBN 0-88344-834-3
- Nicholas Tapp: «China: A Pandora's Box?», i Anthropology Today, Vol. 2, No. 2 (April 1986), s. 10–12
- Manuel Teixeira, S.J.: Macau e la sua Diocese, bd I-II, Instituto Cultural de Macau, 1940
- James C. Thomson Jr.: «Recollections of a Cultural Imperialist», i The Atlantic Monthly (August 1971)
- Rudolf Gerhard Tiedemann (ed.), Handbook of Christianity in China. Volume Two: 1800-present. (Handbook of Oriental Studies: Section 4 China), Edited by R. G. Tiedemann, Brill: Leiden - Boston 2010, 1050 pp., ISBN 978-90-04-11430-2
- S.L. Tikhvinski & Vladimir S. Myasnikov (ed.): Istoriya rossiyskoy dukhovnоy missii v Kitaye, Moskva: Izdatelstvo Svyato-Vladimirskogo Bratstva, 1997 [С.Л.Тихвинский, В.С.Мясников (ред.), История Российской духовной миссии в Китае, Москва: Издательство Свято-Владимирского Братства Братства 1997]
  - Arne Tolo (red.:) Såtid, vekst og modning: Historien om Norsk Luthersk Misjonssambands arbeid i Asia, Afrika og Sør-Amerika, Oslo: Lunde Forlag, 2002 ISBN 82-520-3549-3
- Giuseppe M. Toscano: La prima missione cattolica nel Tibet, Parma: Istituto Missioni Estere 1953 [opptrykk: Alla scoperta del Tibet, Bologna 1977]
- Theodore E. Trautlein: «Jesuit Missions in China during the Last Years of K'ang Hsi», i The Pacific Historical Review, Vol. 10, No. 4 (Dec., 1941), s. 435–446
- Donald W. Treadgold: The West in Russia and China, bd. 2: China 1582–1949. Cambridge: Cambridge University Press 1973 [Se også anmeldelsen av J.B. Grieder i Journal of Asian Studies 33 (1974), s. 462–466, og Treadgolds svar i nr. 37 (1977) s. 189-190]
- Nicolas Trigault, translated by Louis J. Gallagher: China in the Sixteenth Century: The Journals of Ricci, Random House, New York, 1953. (English translation of De Christiana expeditione apud Sinas suscepta ab Societate Jesu)
- Nancy Bernkopf Tucker: «An Unlikely Peace: American Missionaries and the Chinese Communists, 1948-50», i The Pacific Historical Review, vol. 45, nr. 1 (February 1976), s. 97–116
- Stephen Uhalley jr. og Xiaoxin Wu (red.): China and Christianity: Burdened Past, Hopeful Future, Armonk, New York - London: M.E. Sharpe, 2001, ISBN 0-7656-0661-5
- Joseph Van den Brandt: Les Lazaristes en Chine 1697–1935: Notices biographiques, Pei-p'ing: Imprimerie des Lazaristes, 1936
- Panikkar, K. M. (1953). Asia and Western dominance. London: G. Allen and Unwin.
- Ph. Vanhaelemeersch: «Le combat pour la liberté religieuse en Chine sous la jeune république (1913–1917)- est-ce vraiment un combat héroïque?», i Carrier Verbiest, XIX, juli 2007, s. 6–8
- Ph. Vanhaelemeersch: «De la cuisine de la diplomatie Sino-Vaticane. La Manchurie, dans les années trentes», i Carrier Verbiest, XIX, juli 2007, s. 8–10
- H. Verhaeren, C.M..: «A German Edition of Fr. Martino Martini's Novus Atlas Sinensis», i Monumenta Serica 12 (1947), s. 260-265 (Nyopptrykk i Malek/Zingerle (utg.): Martino Martini S.J. (1614–1661) und die Chinamission im 17. Jahrhundert, Nettetal: Steyl, 1996, s. 241–252
- Benoît Vermander, S.J.: «Christianity and the Development of China’s Civil Society: A Comparative and Prospective Analysis», i Inter-Religio Bulletin, no. 37, Summer 2000, s. 3–15. - Internetversjon
- Fidel Villaroel, O.P.: «The Chinese Rites Controversy: Dominican Viewpoint» i Philippiniana Sacra vol. XXVII nr. 82 (1993), s. 5–61
- Peter Chen-Main Wang (Ed.): Contextualization of Christianity in China. An Evaluation in Modern Perspective, Collectanea Serica, Monumenta Serica Institute, Sankt Augustin - Steyler Verlag, Nettetal 2007, 316 pp., ISBN 978-3-8050-0547-0
- Abbe Livingston Warnshuis: «Christian Missions and the Situation in China», i Annals of the American Academy of Politician and Social Science, Vol. 132, Some Outstanding Problems of American Foreign Policy (juli 1927)
- Wang Wei-fan: «Tombstone Carvings from AD 86: Did Christianity Reach China In the First Century?», i China News Update, January 2003. Online websted besøkt 10. February 2007.
- Louis Wei Tsing-sing: La Politique Missionaire de la France en Chine 1842-1856, Paris, 1961
- Louis Wei Tsing-sing: Le Saint-Siège et la Chine, Paris, 1971
- Louis Wei Tsing-sing: Le Saint-Siège, la France et la Chine sous le Pontificat de Léon XII: Le projet de l'établissement d'une Nonciature à Pékin et l'affaire du Pei-t'ang 1880-1886, Schöneck/ Beckenried, Nouvelle Revue de science missionnaire, 1966
- Cornelius Wessels: Early Jesuit Travellers in Central Asia, Haag: Martinus Nijhoff, 1924
- Cornelius Wessels: «Introduction: The Jesuit Mission in Tibet, 1625-1721», i Filippo de Filippi (red.): An Account of Tibet: The Travels of Ippolito Desideri of Pistoia, S.J., London: Routledge, 1932, s. 3-32 med noter s. 365–373
- Philip L. Wickeri: Seeking the Common Ground: Protestant Christianity, the Three-Self Movement, and China's United Front, Maryknoll NY: Orbis Books, 1989, ISBN 0-88344-441-0
- Eric Widmer: The Russian Ecclesiastical Mission in Peking during the Eighteenth Century, Cambridge, MA: Harvard University Press, 1976, ISBN 0-674-78129-5
- Jean-Paul Wiest: «Christianity in China», i New Catholic Encyclopedia, 2nd ed., Washington D.C. 2003, ISBN 0-7876-4007-7 (bind 3)
- Jean-Paul Wiest: Maryknoll in China: A History, 1918-1955, Armonk, NY: M.E. Sharpe, 1988, ISBN 1-57075-142-0
- Eleutherius Winance, O.S.B.: The Communist Persuasion: A Personal Experience of Brainwashing, New York: P.J. Kenedy & Sons, 1959
- John W. Witek, S.J.: Controversial Ideas in China and Europe: A Biography of Jean-François Foucquet S.J. (1665–1741), Roma, 1982
- John W. Witek, S.J.: «Johann Adam Schall and the Transition from the Ming to the Ch'ing Dynasty», s. 109–124, i Roman Malek, S.V.D. (red.): Western Learning and Christianity in China: The Contribution and Impact of Johann Adam Schall von Bell, S.J. (1592–1666) 1 (Monumenta Serica Monograph Series XXXV/1), Nettetal: Steyler Verlag, 1998
- John W. Witek, S.J. (red.): Religion and Culture: An International Symposium Commemorating The Fourth Centenary of the University College of St. Paul - Macau, 28 November to 1 December 1994, Macau: Instituto Cultural de Macau, 1999, ISBN 972-35-0235-6
- John W. Witek, S.J.: «Reporting to Rome: Some Mayor Events in the Christian Community in Beijing, 1686-1687», i Actes du VIIe colloque international de sinologie, Chantilly 1992: Échanges culturels et religieux entre la Chine el l'Occident (Var.Sin., 83), Taipei: Ricci Institute, 1995
- John W. Witek, S.J.: «Un controversiste jésuite en Chine et en Europe», i Actes du Colloque international de Sinologie, 1976, s. 115–135
- John W. Witek, S.J.: «Understanding the Chinese: A Comparison of Matteo Ricci and the French Jesuit Mathematicians Sent by Louis XIV», i Charles E. Ronan S.J. og Bonnie B. C. Oh (red.): East Meets West: The Jesuits in China, Chicago, 1988, s. 62–102
- John W. Witek, S.J.: «Universal Teaching from the West», i Stephen Uhalley jr. og Xiaoxin Wu (red.): China and Christianity: Burdened Past, Hopeful Future, Armonk NY - London: M.E. Sharpe, 2001
- John W. Witek, S.J.: «With a View towards Japan: Alessandro Valignano and the Opening of the College in Macau», i John W. Witek (red.): Religion and Culture: An International Symposium Commemorating The Fourth Centenary of the University College of St. Paul - Macau, 28 November to 1 December 1994, Macau: Instituto Cultural de Macau, 1999, s. 51–68, ISBN 972-35-0235-6
- Elmer Wurth, M.M. (kompilator) og Betty Ann Maheu, M.M. (red.): Papal Documents Related to China 1937-2005, Holy Spirit Study Centre, Hong Kong, 2006, ISBN 978-962-86367-9-2
- Tomasz Wisniewski: «Die Russisch-Orthodoxe Kirche in China: Im Dienst der Politik, der Wissenschaft und des Evangeliums», i China Heute 16 (1997), s. 111-119 (I)
- Xiao Zhitian: «Reflections on the Long Term Character of Religion: Insights from Christianity Fever», i China Study Journal, December 1991
  - Jun Xing: Baptized in the Fire of Revolution: The American Socian Gospel und the YMCA in China, 1919-1937, doktoravhandling, University of Minnesota, 1993
- Yihua Xu: «"Patriotic" Protestants: The Making of an Official Church», i Jason Kindopp & Carol Lee Hamrin (red.): God and Caesar in China: Policy Implications of Church-State Tensions, Washington DC:The Brookings Institution, 2004, s. 107–121, ISBN 0-8157-4936-8
- Khiok-Khng Yeo: Chairman Mao Meets the Apostle Paul: Christianity, Communism and the Hope of China, Brazos Press, 2002, ISBN 1-58743-034-7
- John D. Young: Confucianism and Christianity: the First Encounter, Hong Kong: University Press, 1983
- Paul Zepp, S.V.D.: «Die Exkommunikation von Bischöfen nach den CIC 1983 und Bedingungen für die Aufhebung im Hinblick auf die Situation der chinesischen Bischöfe», in: Roman Malek, S.V.D. - Werner Prawdzik, S.V.D. (red.): Zwischen Autonomie und Anlehnung: Die Problematik der katholischen Kirche in China, theologisch und geschichtlich gesehen, Nettetal: Steyler Verlag, 1989, s. 121–131, ISBN 3-8050-0385-4
- Jost Oliver Zetsche: The Bible in China: The History of «the Union Version» or the Culmination of Protestant Bible Translation in China, (Monumenta Serica: 45), Nettetal: Steyler Verlag, 1999, ISBN 3-8050-0433-8
- Huaqing Zhao: Die Missionsgeschichte Chinas unter besonderer Berücksichtigung der Bedeutung der Laien bei der Missionierungsarbeit (ca. 16. - 19. Jh.). Studia Instituti Missiologici Societatis Verbi Divini 97, Steyler Verlag: Nettetal 2012, 308 pp., ISBN 978-3-8050-0604-0.
- John Baptist Zhang Shijiang: «The Promotion of the Bible in Contemporary China and Evangelization», i Tripod, Spring 2007 Vol. 27 - No. 144, se nettutgave Nettsted besøkt 1. juni 2007. Kinesisk original også publisert i papirutgaven i samme tidsskrift: 當代中國教會的聖經推廣與福傳.
- Erik Zürcher: Bouddhisme, Christianisme et société chinoise, Paris, 1990
- Erik Zürcher: «In the Beginning: 17th Century Chinese Reactions to Christian Creationism», i: Time and Space in Chinese Culture, red. av Chun-Chich Huang and Erik Zürcher, Leiden: E. J. Brill, 1995

== See also ==
- Historical Bibliography of the China Inland Mission
- List of Protestant theological seminaries in China
