= Anthony Clark =

Anthony or Tony Clark may refer to:

== Anthony ==
- A-One (graffiti artist) (1964–2001), American graffiti artist Anthony Clark
- Anthony Clark (actor) (1964–2026), American actor and comedian
- Anthony Clark (badminton) (born 1977), English badminton player
- Anthony Clark (cartoonist), colour artist for the comic Atomic Robo
- Anthony Clark (cricketer) (born 1977), Australian cricketer
- Anthony Clark (cyclist) (born 1987), American cyclo-cross cyclist
- Anthony Clark (footballer) (born 1984), English footballer
- Anthony Clark (powerlifter) (1966–2005), American former holder of the World Record for bench press
- Anthony Clark (swimmer) Tahitian swimmer; see List of Tahitian records in swimming
- Anthony E. Clark (born 1967), American Sinologist, historian, and writer
- Anthony John Clark (1951–2004), English scientist who was part of the team that cloned Dolly the Sheep

== Tony ==
- Tony Clark, Blessid Union of Souls's bass guitarist
- Tony Clark (born 1972), former professional baseball player
- Tony Clark (cinematographer), Australian cinematographer, founder and managing director of Rising Sun Pictures
- Tony Clark (darts player) (born 1955), Welsh darts player
- Tony Clark (footballer) (born 1977), retired English footballer
- Tony Clark (politician) (born 1971), North Dakota Public Service Commissioner
- Tony Clark (sport shooter) (1924–2009), British Olympic shooter

== See also ==
- Anthony Clark Arend (born 1958), American international relations scholar
- Anthony Clarke (disambiguation)
- Antony Clark (born 1956), South African headmaster
