= Dunfield =

Dunfield may refer to:

- Dunfield, Newfoundland and Labrador, Canada
- Dunfield, Gloucestershire, a hamlet of Kempsford in England

== People with the surname ==
- Hugh Clifford Dunfield (1891–1973), Canadian provincial politician
- Kari Dunfield (fl. 1995–2018), Canadian agrometeorologist
- Nathan Dunfield (born 1975), American mathematician
- Peter Dunfield (c. 1931–2014), Canadian figure skater and coach
- Sonya Klopfer Dunfield (born 1934), American competitive figure skater and coach
- Terry Dunfield (born 1982), Canadian soccer player

== See also ==
- Denfield, a heritage-listed property in New South Wales, Australia
- Duffield (disambiguation)
