= Anthony Clarke =

Anthony or Tony Clarke may refer to:

- Tony Clarke (British politician) (born 1963), English Labour Party politician, MP for Northampton South from 1997 to 2005
- Anthony Clarke (judoka) (born 1961), Australian athlete
- Tony Clarke, Baron Clarke of Stone-cum-Ebony (1943–2026), British lawyer and judge
- Tony Clarke (singer) (1940–1971), American soul singer
- Tony Clarke (record producer) (1941–2010), English music producer
- Tony Clarke (sport shooter) (born 1959), New Zealand sports shooter
- Tony Clarke, Baron Clarke of Hampstead (born 1932), British trade unionist and Labour peer
- Anthony Clarke (businessman) (born 1953), British chartered accountant and businessman
- Anthony Clarke (bookseller), British army officer, bookseller and poet
- Anthony John Clarke, Irish-born singer-songwriter
- Anthony J. Clarke, British academic and Baptist minister
- Anto Clarke (1944–2019), Irish judoka
- Tony Clarke (speedway rider) (1940–2014), English speedway rider

== See also ==
- Anthony Clark (disambiguation)
- Anthony Clarke Booth (1846–1899), English recipient of the Victoria Cross
