= Canadian Journal of Microbiology =

- Discipline: Microbiology
- Language: English
- Edited by: Kari Dunfield; Christopher K. Yost

Publication details
- History: 1954–present
- Publisher: Canadian Science Publishing (Canada)
- Frequency: Continous
- Open access: Hybrid
- Impact factor: 2.4 (2025)

Standard abbreviations
- ISO 4: Can. J. Microbiol.

Indexing
- CODEN: CJMIAZ
- ISSN: 0008-4166 (print); 1480-3275 (web)
- LCCN: 59004206
- OCLC no.: 767963354

Links
- Journal homepage; Online access; Online archive

The Canadian Journal of Microbiology is a peer-reviewed scientific journal covering all aspects of microbiology. It was established in 1954 and is published by Canadian Science Publishing. The Editors-in-Chief are Kari Dunfield (University of Guelph) and Christopher K. Yost (University of Regina). The founding editor (serving from 1954 to 1960) was Robert George Everett Murray (1919–2022).

== Abstracting and indexing ==
The journal is abstracted and indexed in:

- AGRICOLA
- BIOSIS Previews
- Current Contents/Agriculture, Biology & Environmental Sciences
- Current Contents/Life Sciences
- Elsevier BIOBASE
- Index Medicus/MEDLINE/PubMed
- Science Citation Index Expanded
- Scopus

According to the Journal Citation Reports, the journal has a 2025 impact factor of 2.4.
