= Kari Dunfield =

Canadian agrometeorologist

Academic background
- Education: BSc, Biological Sciences, 1995, University of Calgary; M.Sc., 1999, PhD, 2002, University of Saskatchewan
- Thesis: Impact of field-grown genetically modified canola on the diversity of rhizosphere and root-interior microbial communities. (2002)

Kari Edith Dunfield is a Canadian microbiologist. She is a Canada Research Chair in Environmental Microbiology of Agro-ecosystems and Professor in Applied Soil Ecology in the School of Environmental Sciences at the University of Guelph. As of 2016, she is the co-editor of the Canadian Journal of Microbiology.

== Early life and education ==
Dunfield earned her Bachelor of Science degree from the University of Calgary in 1995 before enrolling at the University of Saskatchewan for her Master's degree and PhD.

== Career ==
Upon receiving her PhD, Dunfield accepted a faculty position at the University of Guelph. In 2013, Dunfield was appointed a Tier 2 Canada Research Chair (CRC) in Environmental Microbiology of Agro-ecosystems for a five year term. In this role, she was tasked with studying how microorganisms help ensure environmental sustainability in agro-ecosystems. Shortly after receiving this role, Dunfield was appointed a co-editor of the Canadian Journal of Microbiology, replacing James J. Germida and Anthony J. Clarke. Her CRC position was renewed in 2018 for another five year term to continue studying the effects of human activity on soil health and ecosystem function. In the same year, she collaborated with Laura Van Eerd and Claudia Wagner-Riddle to lead Guelph's soil health outreach program in Ontario, as a result of "having produced high-quality research and engaged in collaboration and outreach."
