= Newman Studies Journal =

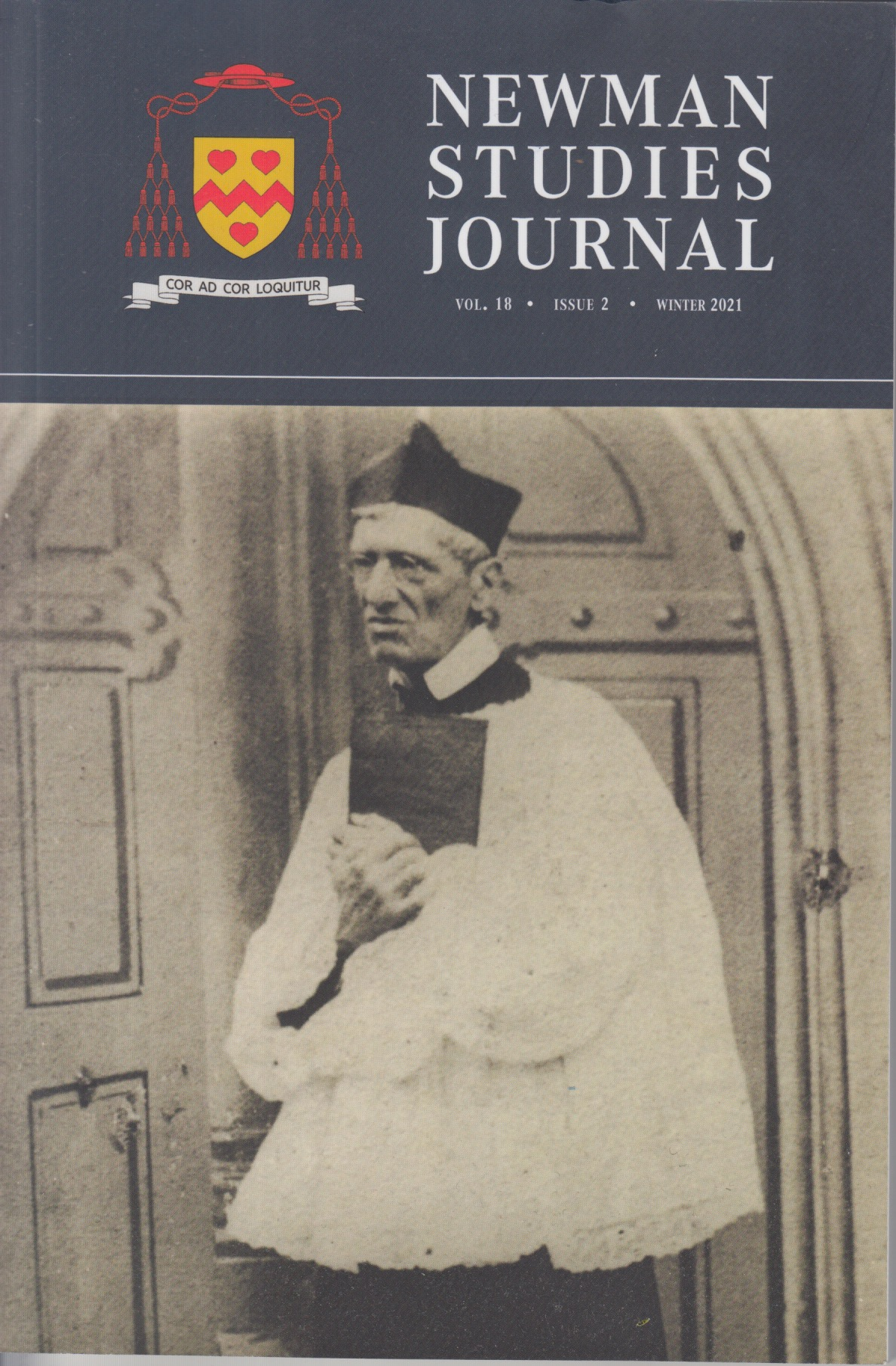
- Discipline: Religious Studies, Theology, Philosophy, History, Literature
- Language: English
- Edited by: Kenneth L. Parker, Shaun Blanchard, Christopher Cimorelli, Elizabeth A. Huddleston

Publication details
- History: 2004-present
- Publisher: Catholic University of America Press/National Institute for Newman Studies (United States)
- Frequency: Biannual (Summer/Winter)

Standard abbreviations
- ISO 4: Newman Stud. J.

Indexing
- ISSN: 1547-9080 (print); 2153-6945 (web)
- LCCN: 2003-202618
- OCLC no.: 53913726

Links
- Journal homepage; Online access

Newman Studies Journal is a peer-reviewed academic journal that examines the intellectual legacy of John Henry Newman from a Catholic perspective.

== Background ==
Established in 2004, the Newman Review has published several hundred articles, reviews, and bibliographic overviews of secondary work on Newman. The journal is published twice a year by the National Institute of Newman Studies, in affiliation with Duquesne University in Pittsburgh. Notable contributors have included Cardinals Avery Dulles, Joseph Ratzinger, and Donald Wuerl. Print subscriptions and online access are provided by the Philosophy Documentation Center.

== Editorial Board ==
The present Editor-in-Chief is Professor Kenneth L Parker, of Duquesne University, who has held the position since 2016, he is assisted by four Associate Editors: Dr Elizabeth A. Huddleston, Dr Christopher Cimorelli, Dr Shaun Blanchard and Msgr Richard M. Liddy. In addition a team of almost 30 academics sit on the editorial board and peer review all articles prior to publication.
