= Thorstein Himle =

Thorstein Himle (October 11, 1857 – October 18, 1925) was a Norwegian-born American missionary affiliated with the American Lutheran Hauge Synod Mission to China.

== Biography ==
Thorstein Oddson Himle was born in Voss Municipality in Søndre Bergenhus county, Norway. He was attended the Voss Training College (Voss lærerskole) from 1873 to 1875. He then worked as a teacher until 1885. In 1885, Himle emigrated to the United States, received theological training at the Red Wing Seminary in Minnesota between 1887 and 1889 and became a Lutheran minister. Having worked as a clergyman in Taylor, Minnesota for five years he studied at the University of Minnesota during 1894-1895.

In 1895, Himle traveled as a missionary to the Hauge Synod mission field for China Missions in the Hubei Province of China. He was in Fancheng until 1903 and then relocated to Xinye in Henan until 1909. He then came back to America, where he taught theology at the Red Wing Seminary from 1912 and then served as pastor of the Santa Rosa church in California. Late in his career, he was traveling secretary for the Norwegian Lutheran Church's pension fund.

He was married three times and widowed twice: first in 1889 with Gidske Sigmundstad (1863–1898), in 1899 to Anna Carlson (1870–1918) and in 1922 to Anna Sigmundstad Haugen (1870–1954).

== Selected works ==
- Guds Veje Med et gjenstridig Folk: En historisk Beretning, (1902)
- Hauges Synodes Missionskart, 1904
- Utvalgte stykker til husandakt, (1906)
- Evangeliets Seier: Festdskrift for Hauge Synode Kinamissions 25 Aars Jubilæum (1916)

== See also ==
- Fangcheng Fellowship
