= David Emil Mungello =

American historian (1943–2026)

David Emil Mungello (November 20, 1943 – July 4, 2026) was an American historian on the cultural interaction between Europe and China since 1550. He wrote on the introduction of Christianity into China and the reception of Confucianism into Europe. Mungello is recognized as one of the leading modern authorities on the Jesuit missions in China. He also wrote on the history of queer Western men in China.

== Life and career ==
Mungello received a B.A. in philosophy at George Washington University in 1965, an M.A. in Asian studies from the University of California, Berkeley, in 1969, and a Ph.D. in history from the University of California, Berkeley, in 1973. His Ph.D. dissertation was on Leibniz and Confucianism, later published in 1977. He taught at Lingnan College in Hong Kong, Briarcliff College, Coe College (Iowa), and Baylor University.

Mungello died in Waco, Texas, on July 4, 2026, at the age of 82.

== Works ==
- Leibniz and Confucianism: The Search for Accord (1977)
- "Confucianism in the Enlightenment: Antagonism and Collaboration between the Jesuits and the Philosophes", China and Europe: Images and Influences [from the] Sixteenth to Eighteenth Centuries, Monograph Series, No. 12, Hong Kong: Chinese University Press, 1991, pp. 99–128, ISBN 9789622014657.
- The Forgotten Christians of Hangzhou (1994)
- The Chinese Rites Controversy: Its History and Meaning (1994)
- The Great Encounter of China and the West, 1500-1800 (1999)
- Curious Land: Jesuit Accommodation and the Origins of Sinology, Honolulu: University of Hawaii Press, 1989, ISBN 0-8248-1219-0.
- The Spirit and the Flesh in Shandong, 1650-1785 (2001)
- Western Queers in China: Flight to the Land of Oz (2012)
- The Silencing of Jesuit Figurist Joseph de Prémare in Eighteenth-Century China (2023)
