= Tony Lambert =

British diplomat

Tony Lambert (born 1948) is a former British diplomat to Beijing, China and Tokyo, Japan and author of several significant books regarding Christianity in China.

== Works authored ==
- China's Christian Millions (New Edition, Fully Revised and Updated) (2006)
- Counting Christians in China: a cautionary report.: An article from: International Bulletin of Missionary Research (2005)
- The Resurrection of the Chinese Church (1994)
