= Anthony Clark (cyclist) =

American cyclo-cross cyclist

Personal information
- Born: 14 June 1987 (age 39) Agawam, Massachusetts, United States
- Height: 165 cm (5 ft 5 in)
- Weight: 63 kg (139 lb)

Cycling career
- Sport: Cycling
- Discipline: Cyclo-cross
- Role: Rider

Amateur team
- J.A.M Fund

Major wins
- Paris to Ancaster 2014, Vermont Overland 2015, NBX UCI 2016

Anthony Clark (born 14 June 1987) is an American cyclo-cross cyclist. He represented his nation in the men's elite event at the 2016 UCI Cyclo-cross World Championships in Heusden-Zolder.

== Major results ==
2013–2014
3rd Ellison Park #1
3rd HPCX
2015–2016
1st Overall Verge NECXS

1st NBX Gran Prix of Cross #2

2nd NBX Gran Prix of Cross #1
2nd CXLA Weekend #1
3rd CXLA Weekend #2
3rd The Cycle-Smart International #1
3rd HPCX #1
3rd North Carolina Grand Prix #2
2016–2017
2nd Nittany Lion Cross #2
3rd DCCX Day 1
2017–2018
1st West Sacramento Grand Prix #1
2nd DCCX Day 1
2nd DCCX Day 2
Qiansen Trophy

3rd Fengtai Changxindian

3rd West Sacramento Grand Prix #2
2018–2019
Kansai Cyclo Cross

1st Makino

1st Starlight-cross
1st West Sacramento Grand Prix #1
1st Rapha Supercross Nobeyama Day 1
2nd Rapha Supercross Nobeyama Day 2
Qiansen Trophy

3rd Aohan Station

3rd Gran Prix of Gloucester #2
