= Anthony E. Clark =

American Sinologist, historian and writer

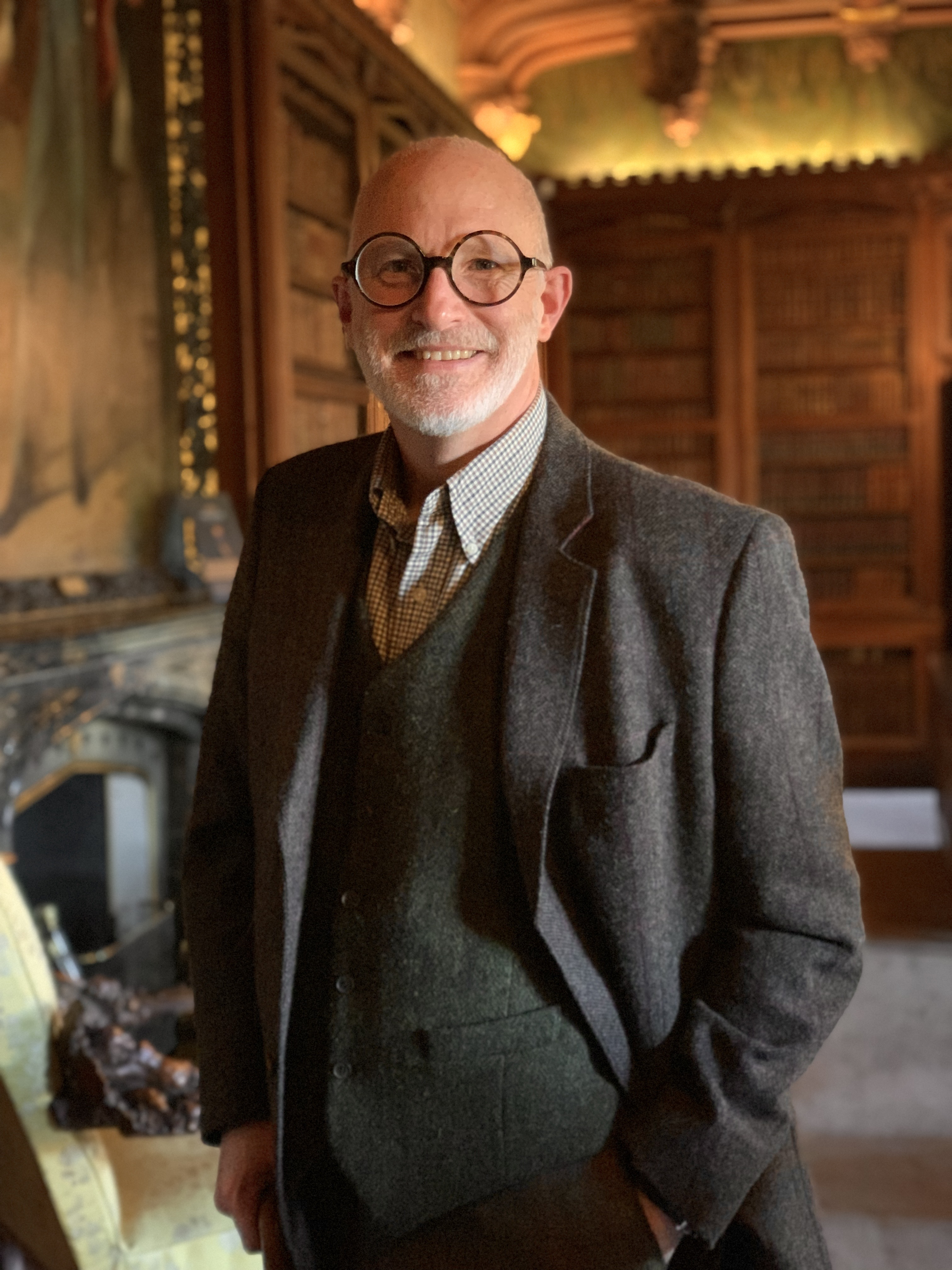
- Clark in 2021
- Born: 12 March 1967 (age 59); Eugene, Oregon
- Spouse: Amanda C. Roth Clark
- Relatives: Hon. Joseph S. Clark (cousin)
- Awards: American Council of Learned Societies Fellow 2012 Royal Historical Society Fellow 2021. Royal Asiatic Society of Great Britain and Ireland Fellow 2024

Academic background
- Education: University of Oregon
- Doctoral advisor: Stephen Durrant

Academic work
- Discipline: Chinese history
- Institutions: Whitworth University

Chinese name
- Traditional Chinese: 柯學斌
- Simplified Chinese: 柯学斌
Transcriptions
Standard Mandarin
- Hanyu Pinyin: Kē Xuébīn

Anthony Eugene Clark (born 12 March 1967) is an American sinologist, historian, and writer. He is the Edward B. Lindaman Endowed Chair and a professor of Chinese history at Whitworth University.

== Education ==
Clark received his B.A. and Ph.D. from the University of Oregon, where he focused on Chinese language, literature, and history. He has also studied at the Central University for Nationalities/Minzu University of China in Beijing, China, Alliance Française in Paris, France, and the National Taiwan Normal University in Taipei, Taiwan.

== Life and works ==
Born on 12 March 1967 in Eugene, Oregon, and in addition to brief studies at Mount Angel Abbey Seminary and Byzantine Catholic Seminary of SS. Cyril and Methodius, he studied and taught Chinese martial arts such as Yang Style Tai Chi and 7-Star Northern Praying Mantis Kung Fu from 1979 until 1995. He began his advanced studies of classical Sinology under Stephen W. Durrant, a scholar on the Han dynasty historian, Sima Qian, at the University of Oregon in 1995. Clark's scholarly interest while studying at Oregon centered on the early Han dynasty historian, Ban Gu, and also on the history of Sino-Western interactions, especially in the area of Roman Catholic missionary exchange with Chinese intellectuals during the late Qing. Given his experience as a Catholic seminarian and having studied Chinese martial arts, he developed an interest in the Sino-Missionary conflicts between local Chinese martial artists and Roman Catholic missionaries during the Boxer Uprising, which led to the publication of China's Saints and Heaven in Conflict. Clark's interest in the history of how women participated in important historical transitions during the late-imperial China also inspired him to dedicate much of Heaven in Conflict to the role of female Boxers, known as Red Lanterns (Boxer Uprising), in the events of the Boxer incidents at Shanxi in 1900.

In 2019, Clark published the first scholarly study of the famous Xishiku Roman Catholic cathedral in Beijing and its architect, Alphonse Favier, China Gothic: The Bishop of Beijing and His Cathedral. This is the only Christian church in Beijing to have survived in Beijing through the Boxer Uprising in 1900, and it since 1984 it is protected as one of China's national cultural relics. In 2020, a compendium of his essays was published that highlights Clark's observations while conducting research and writing in China, entitled China’s Catholic in an Era of Transformation: Observations of an “Outsider”. In 2021, he published a study and translation of Wang Yinglin's Three Character Classic and Giulio Aleni's Four Character Classic in his book A Chinese Jesuit Catechism: Giulio Aleni's Four Character Classic.

After receiving his first appointment at The University of Alabama in 2005, Clark published his first book on Han dynasty historiography, and turned to his main scholarly focus, which is the history of Christian missions in China. Clark's scholarly publications on Christianity in China have combined his Sinological training in early Chinese texts and his training in late-imperial Sino-Western exchange to analyze how traditional Chinese religious and philosophical views have intersected with those views that were imported into China by Western missionaries. This area of focus resulted in invitations to provide talks and workshops on his work at such institutions as the University of Notre Dame, Oxford University, and Berkeley in 2017, and Princeton University in 2009. In 2020, Clark was the interviewer in a series of recorded interviews with many of the world's most prominent scholars in the field of Sino-Western and Sino-Christian studies.

His acquaintances with several high-profile Roman Catholics in Mainland China, such as Bishop Aloysius Jin Luxian, Bishop Anicetus Wang Chongyi, Bishop Augustine Hu Daguo, Bishop Peter Xinmao Feng, Bishop Silvester Li Jiantang, and Cardinal Joseph Zen Ze-kiun, provided Clark with several insights into the current situation of the Catholic Church in China. The online Catholic news source, Catholic World Report, features a column, "Clark on China," that publishes frequent essays by Anthony Clark that are known for being balanced and historically grounded commentaries on Catholicism in modern China.

Clark resides with his wife, Amanda, in Spokane, Washington.

== Honors ==
Clark was awarded the J. William Fulbright Program Fellowship for research in early Chinese history and literature, and he prepared his first book, Ban Gu's History of Early China while a Fulbright Scholar at National Taiwan Normal University (NTNU) in Taipei, Taiwan from 2001 to 2002. Clark was also awarded research grants from the National Endowment for the Humanities (NEH)/American Council for Learned Societies (ACLS) and the Chiang Ching-kuo Foundation (CCK), to prepare his book, Heaven in Conflict: Franciscans and the Boxer Uprising in Shanxi, while at Minzu University of China (MUC) in Beijing, China, from 2012 to 2013. He was inducted into several academic honors societies, including Phi Beta Kappa, Alpha Lambda Delta, Phi Eta Sigma, and the Golden Key International Honour Society. The Council of the London Royal Historical Society elected Clark a fellow in 2021 and he was awarded Combe Trust Fellow of the Institute for Advanced Studies in the Humanities at the University of Edinburgh in 2021. In 2024 he was elected a fellow of the Royal Asiatic Society of Great Britain and Ireland.

== Bibliography ==
=== Books (selected) ===
- Staging China: Jesuit Theater and the End of an Empire (Studies in the History of Christianity in East Asia) (2025).
- A Chinese Jesuit Catechism: Giulio Aleni's Four Character Classic (2021).
- China’s Catholic in an Era of Transformation: Observations of an “Outsider” (2020).
- China Gothic: The Bishop of Beijing and His Cathedral (2019).
- Catholicism and Buddhism: The Contrasting Lives and Teaching of Jesus and the Buddha (2018).
- China's Christianity: From Missionary to Indigenous Church (2017).
- Heaven in Conflict: Franciscans and the Boxer Uprising in Shanxi (2015).
- Zhonghua Tianzhujiao xundao jianshi [A Concise History of Catholic Martyrdom in China] (2013).
- A Voluntary Exile: Chinese Christianity and Cultural Confluence since 1552. (2013).
- China's Saints: Catholic Martyrdom During the Qing, 1644–1911 (2011).
- Beating Devils and Burning Their Books: Views of China, Japan, and the West. (2010).
- Ban Gu's History of Early China (2008).

=== Articles (selected) ===
- "Cor ad Cor Loquitur; Cardinal Newman Speaks to China: Newman, Pusey, and the Issue of a National Church," Newman Studies Journal. Summer 2020.
- "An Anomaly of Good Form: A Gothic Church in Shanghai," Sacred Architecture. 2020.
- "Jinshi chuqi Zhongguo minju dui xifang xuanjiao shengxianghua de fanying [Initial Responses to Christian Cross Imagery in China]" Guoji Hanxu. September 2017.
- "Finding Our Way: Thomas Merton, John Wu, and the Christian Dialogue with Early China." The Merton Annual. Spring 2018.
- "Shifting Landscapes: Sino-American Catholic Identities, 1900-Present." U. S. Catholic Historian. Spring 2016.
- "Sanctioned Heterodoxy: Local Cults in Two Chinese Catholic Villages, 1900—Present." Frontiers of History in China. Number 1, 2016.
- "Vincentian Footprints in China: The Lives, Deaths, and Legacies of François-Regis Clét, CM, and Jean-Gabriel Perboyre, CM." Vincentian Heritage. 2014.
- "Weaving a Profound Dialogue Between West and East: On Matteo Ricci, SJ." U.S.-China Review. Summer 2011.
- "Praise and Blame: Ruist Historiography in Ban Gu's Hanshu." The Chinese Historical Review. Spring 2011.
- Clark, Anthony E., and Kellie Cheney. "Bodhidharma's Daughters: A Cross-Cultural Examination of Females in Chan/Zen Buddhism." McNair Scholars Journal. 2009.
- "Early Modern Chinese Reactions to Western Missionary Iconography." Southeast Review of Asian Studies. 2008.
- "Reflections on the Han View of Truth and Historicity with a Translation of Ban Biao's 'Essay of Historiography'." Southeast Review of Asian Studies. 2006.
