= Anthony J. Clarke =

British Baptist theologian

Revered Doctor Anthony John Clarke

Personal details
- Education: Regent's Park College, Oxford
- Website: rpc.ox.ac.uk/people/dr-anthony-clarke

Anthony John Clarke is a British academic and Baptist minister, who is Vice-Principal and Tutorial Fellow in Pastoral Studies and Community Learning at Regent's Park College, Oxford.

He is an ordained minister in the Baptist Union of Great Britain and has served congregations in Dagenham and Oxford. He became a fellow of Regents in 2007 and is the director of the BTh suite, running the Formation for Baptist Ministers' training program.

== Education ==
Clarke graduated with a BA in Classics from Durham University in 1988, before joining Regent's Park College, Oxford, to read Theology whilst undergoing ministerial formation, achieving his MA in 1996. Upon further study focussing on Jesus' cry of dereliction in Mark 15:33-34, he was awarded a Bachelor of Divinity in 2001. Which was later published as part of the Regent's Study Guides published by Smyth and Helwys. In 2017 Clarke completed his DMin (Chester) which explored training practices in several different theological training colleges, which he published in 2021.

== Career ==
Clarke was minister of Dagenham Baptist Church and later South Oxford Baptist Church. He was appointed Tutorial Fellow in Pastoral Studies and Community Learning at Regent's Park College, Oxford in 2007. He has responsibilities for teaching theology, being Director of Studies for the BTh and overseeing Regent's ministerial students.

In late 2025, he is the vice-chair of the academic board for the college's GIC+ Project, aiming to explore religious leadership and LGBTQ+ rights, led by Prof Dr Freya Baetens.

== Publications ==
=== Theses ===
- Clarke, Anthony J. (2017). Forming Ministers or Training Leaders?: An Exploration of Practice and The Pastoral Imagination (DMin thesis). University of Chester.

=== Monographs ===
- A Cry in the Darkness: The Forsakeness of Jesus in Scripture, Theology, and Experience. Macon: Smyth & Helwys. 2002.
- Forming Ministers or Training Leaders?: An Exploration of Practice. Eugene: Resource. 2021.

=== Co-authored works ===
- Anthony J. Clarke; Paul S. Fiddes (2017). Dissenting Spirit: A History of Regent's Park College 1752-2017. Oxford: Regent's Park College.

=== Edited works ===
- Bound for Glory: God, Church and World in Covenant. Oxford: Whitley Publications. 2002.
- Expecting Justice but Seeing Bloodshed: Some Baptist Contributions to Following Jesus in a Violent World. Oxford: Whitley Publications. 2004.
- Anthony Clarke; Paul S. Fiddes, eds. (2005). Flickering Images: Theology and Film in Dialogue. Oxford: Regent's Park College.
- For the Sake of the Church: Essays in Honour of Paul S. Fiddes. Oxford: Regent's Park College. 2014.
- Anthony Clarke; Andrew Moore, eds. (2014). Within the Love of God: Essays on the Doctrine of God in Honour of Paul S. Fiddes. Oxford: Regent's Park College.
- Andy Goodliff; Anthony Clarke; Beth Allison-Glenny, eds. (2020). Reconciling Rites: Essays in Honour of Myra N. Blyth. Oxford: Regent's Park College.
- Being Attentive: Explorations in Practical Theology in Honour of Robert Ellis. Oxford: Regent's Park College. 2021.

=== Chapters in books ===
- "A Trinitarian Theology of Ministerial Formation". For the Sake of the Church: Essays in Honour of Paul S. Fiddes. Oxford: Regent's Park College. 2014.
- Paul S. Fiddes, ed. (2015). "Listening to the Voices: A Baptist Reflection". Sharing the Faith at the Boundaries of Unity: Further Conversations Between Anglicans and Baptists. Oxford: Regent's Park College.
- Andy Goodliff; Paul Goodliff, eds. (2018). "Ascension: 'Rich Wounds Yet Visible Above'". Rhythms of Faithfulness: Essays in Honour of Jhone E. Colwell. Oxford: Regent's Park College.
- "Communion and Formation: How Eating Changes Us?". Reconciling Rites: Essays in Honour of Myra N. Blyth. Oxford: Regent's Park College. 2020.
- "Theological Reflection as Community Discernment: Some New Possibilities for Church Meetings?". Being Attentive: Explorations in Practical Theology in Honour of Robert Ellis. Oxford: Regent's Park College. 2021.
- Helen Paynter; Peter Hatton (eds.). "Holding the Ring: The Marginal Leadership of All". Attending to the Margins: Essays in Honour of Stephen Finamore. Oxford: Regent's Park College.

=== Articles in journals ===
- "Membership Matters: From a Barrier to a Threshold" (PDF). Baptist Ministers' Journal. 293: 15–20. 2006.
- Clarke, Anthony (2015). "How did we end here? Theological education as ministerial formation in the British Baptist colleges". Baptist Quarterly. 46 (2): 69–97. doi:10.1179/0005576X15Z.0000000009.
- Clarke, Anthony (2019). "The So-Called London Baptist Education Society of 1752 - Some Further Explorations". Baptist Quarterly. 50 (3): 86–105. doi:10.1080/0005576X.2019.1626547.
- Clarke, Anthony (2019). ""London Baptist Education Society" Minutes 1752-1805". Baptist Quarterly. 50 (3): 106–138. doi:10.1080/0005576X.2019.1626548.
- "Questioning our Commitments: Exploring Hermeneutical Practice in Discussions of Human Sexuality" (PDF). Journal of Baptist Theology in Context. 8: 82–102. 2023.
- "On What Do We Agree?: The Idea of the Normative in British Baptist Life'". Journal of European Baptist Studies. 24. 2024.
- Elizabeth Allison-Glenny; Stephen Finamore; Andy Goodliff; Julian Gotobed; Jeff Jacobson; Philip Lutterodt; Sally Nelson; Gale Richards; Diane Watts; Simon Woodman (2026). "A Shared Understanding of Baptist Identity". Baptist Quarterly: 1–17.
