= Tetrameric protein =

Quaternary-structure protein with 4 subunits

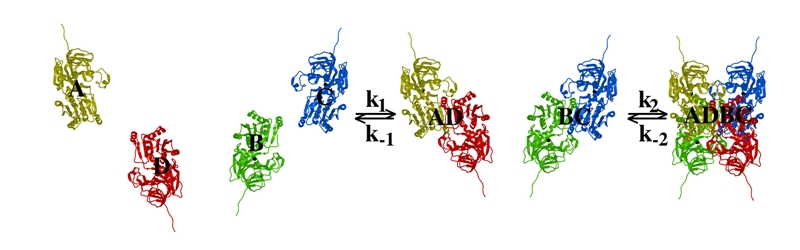
The formation of the sorbitol dehydrogenase tetramer from its monomers via dimers.

A tetrameric protein is a protein with a quaternary structure of four subunits (tetrameric). Homotetramers have four identical subunits (such as glutathione S-transferase), and heterotetramers are complexes of different subunits. A tetramer can be assembled as dimer of dimers with two homodimer subunits (such as sorbitol dehydrogenase), or two heterodimer subunits (such as hemoglobin).

== Subunit interactions in tetramers ==
The interactions between subunits forming a tetramer is primarily determined by non covalent interaction. Hydrophobic effects, hydrogen bonds and electrostatic interactions are the primary sources for this binding process between subunits. For homotetrameric proteins such as sorbitol dehydrogenase (SDH), the structure is believed to have evolved going from a monomeric to a dimeric and finally a tetrameric structure in evolution. The binding process in SDH and many other tetrameric enzymes can be described by the gain in free energy which can be determined from the rate of association and dissociation. The above image shows the assembly of the four subunits (A, B, C and D) in SDH.

== Hydrogen bonds between subunits ==
Hydrogen bonding networks between subunits has been shown to be important for the stability of the tetrameric quaternary protein structure. For example, a study of SDH which used diverse methods such as protein sequence alignments, structural comparisons, energy calculations, gel filtration experiments and enzyme kinetics experiments, could reveal an important hydrogen bonding network which stabilizes the tetrameric quaternary structure in mammalian SDH.

== Tetramers in immunology ==
In immunology, MHC tetramers can be used in tetramer assays, to quantify numbers of antigen-specific T cells (especially CD8+ T cells). MHC tetramers are based on recombinant class I molecules that, through the action of bacterial BirA, have been biotinylated. These molecules are folded with the peptide of interest and β2M and tetramerized by a fluorescently labeled streptavidin. (Streptavidin binds to four biotins per molecule.) This tetramer reagent will specifically label T cells that express T cell receptors that are specific for a given peptide-MHC complex. For example, a Kb/FAPGNYPAL tetramer will specifically bind to Sendai virus specific cytotoxic T cell in a C57BL/6 mouse. Antigen specific responses can be measured as CD8+, tetramer+ T cells as a fraction of all CD8+ lymphocytes.

The reason for using a tetramer, as opposed to a single labeled MHC class I molecule is that the tetrahedral tetramers can bind to three TCRs at once, allowing specific binding in spite of the low (1 micromolar) affinity of the typical class I-peptide-TCR interaction. MHC class II tetramers can also be made, although these are more difficult to work with practically.

== Homotetramers and heterotetramers ==
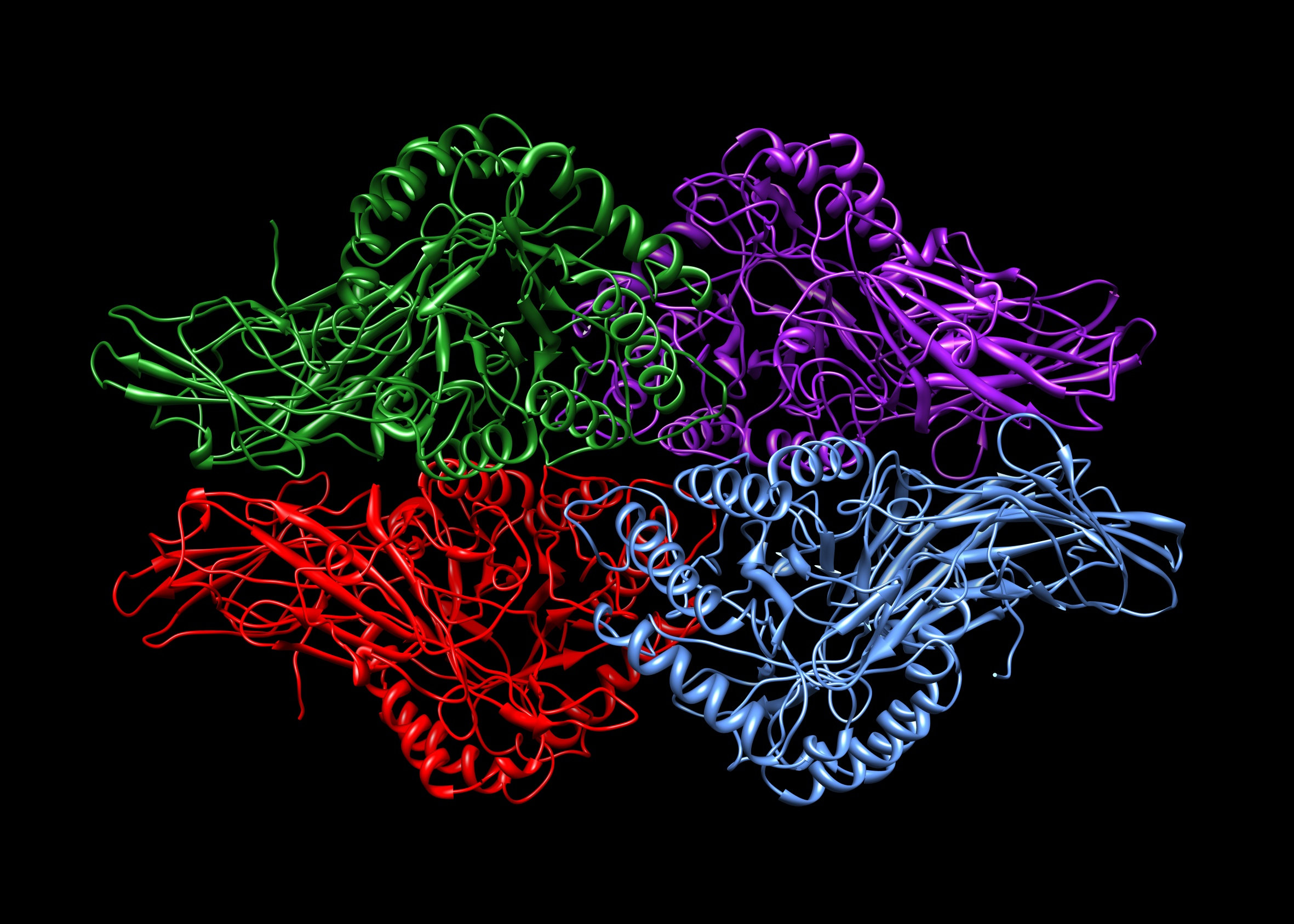
A homotetrameric complex, beta-glucuronidase (a glycosidase). Each subunit has the same amino acid sequence.

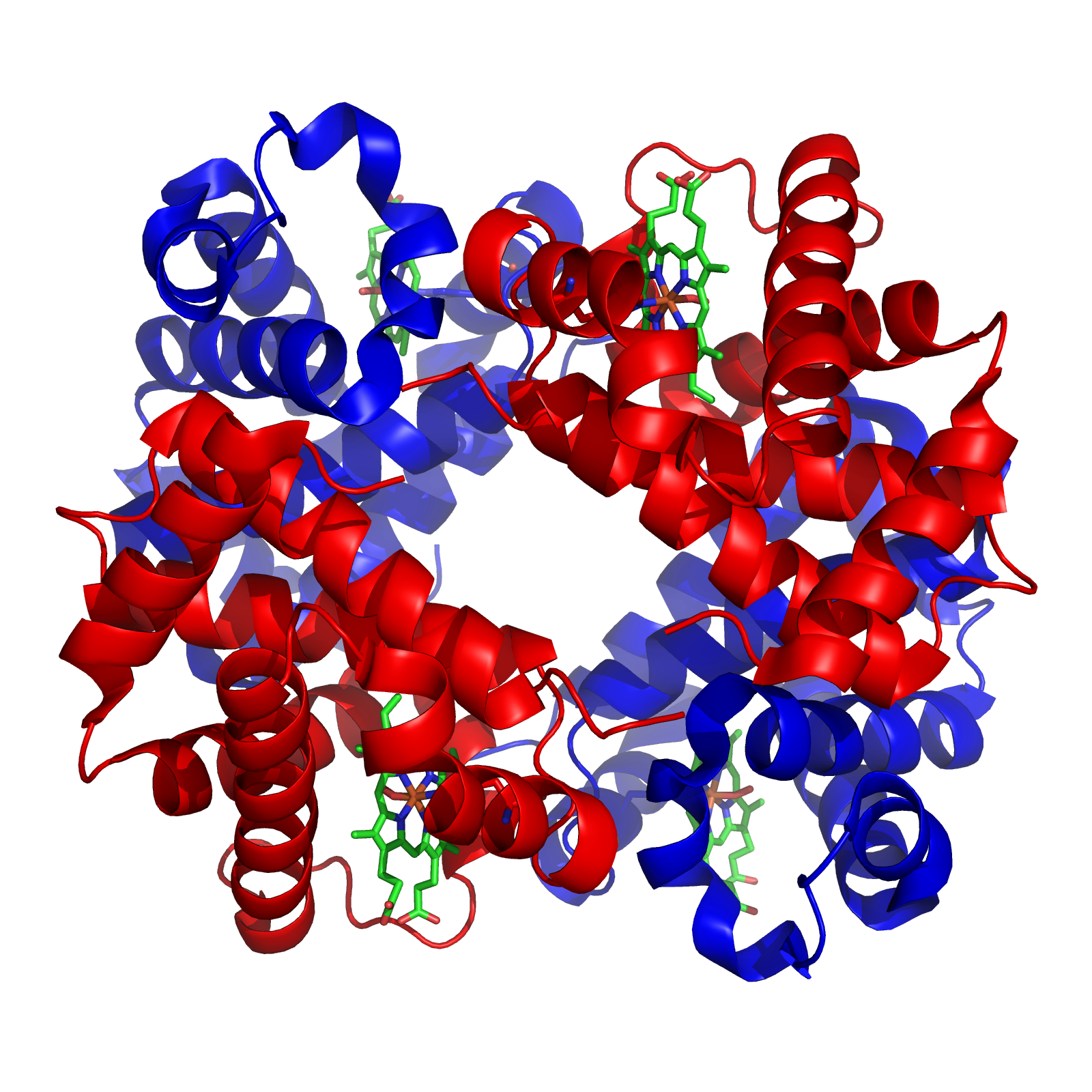
The heterotetrameric molecule haemoglobin, made up of four subunits of two different types (coloured red and blue.)

A homotetramer is a protein complex made up of four identical subunits which are associated but not covalently bound. Conversely, a heterotetramer is a 4-subunit complex where one or more subunits differ.

Examples of homotetramers include:

- enzymes like beta-glucuronidase (pictured)
- export factors such as SecB from Escherichia coli
- magnesium ion transporters such as CorA.
- lectins such as Concanavalin A
- IMPDH and IMPDH2

Examples of heterotetramers include haemoglobin (pictured), the NMDA receptor, some aquaporins, some AMPA receptors, as well as some enzymes.

=== Purification of heterotetramers ===
Ion-exchange chromatography is useful for isolating specific heterotetrameric protein assemblies, allowing purification of specific complexes according to both the number and the position of charged peptide tags. Nickel affinity chromatography may also be employed for heterotetramer purification.

=== Intragenic complementation ===
Multiple copies of a polypeptide encoded by a gene often can form an aggregate referred to as a multimer. When a multimer is formed from polypeptides produced by two different mutant alleles of a particular gene, the mixed multimer may exhibit greater functional activity than the unmixed multimers formed by each of the mutants alone. When a mixed multimer displays increased functionality relative to the unmixed multimers, the phenomenon is referred to as intragenic complementation. In humans, argininosuccinate lyase (ASL) is a homotetrameric enzyme that can undergo intragenic complementation. An ASL disorder in humans can arise from mutations in the ASL gene, particularly mutations that affect the active site of the tetrameric enzyme. ASL disorder is associated with considerable clinical and genetic heterogeneity which is considered to reflect the extensive intragenic complementation occurring among different individual patients.
