= Monstrosum =

Monstrosus, monstrous in Latin may refer to:

- Penicillium monstrosum, a synonym for Penicillium brevicompactum, a mold species
- a cultivar of Leopoldia comosa, the tassel hyacinth
- a cultivar of Xerochrysum bracteatum, the golden everlasting

== See also ==
- Monstrosus
