= Aspergillus glabripes =

Scientific classification
- Kingdom: Fungi
- Division: Ascomycota
- Class: Eurotiomycetes
- Order: Eurotiales
- Family: Aspergillaceae
- Genus: Aspergillus
- Species: A. glabripes

Binomial name
- Aspergillus glabripes Sklenar, Jurjević & Hubka (2017)

Species of fungus

Aspergillus glabripes is a species of fungus in the genus Aspergillus. It is from the Robusti section. The species was first described in 2017. It has been isolated from office folders in the United States. It has been reported to produce mycophenolic acid and asperphenamate.
