= Bartolomeo Gosio =

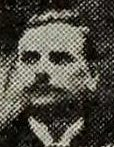
- Bartolomeo Gosio at the Cannes Medical Conference, 1920
- Born: 17 March 1863; Magliano d'Alba, Piedmont, Kingdom of Italy
- Died: 13 April 1944 (aged 81); Rome, Lazio, Kingdom of Italy
- Education: University of Turin; Sapienza University of Rome
- Known for: Gosio gas (trimethylarsine); Discovery of mycophenolic acid
- Scientific career
- Fields: Medicine
- Workplaces: Istituto Superiore di Sanità; Laboratori Scientifici della Direzione di Sanità

Bartolomeo Gosio (17 March 1863 – 13 April 1944) was an Italian medical scientist. He discovered a toxic fume, eponymously named "Gosio gas", which is produced by microorganisms, that killed many people. He identified the chemical nature of the gas as an arsenic compound (arsine), but incorrectly named it as diethylarsine. He also discovered an antibacterial compound called mycophenolic acid from the mould Penicillium brevicompactum. He demonstrated that the novel compound was effective against the deadly anthrax bacterium, Bacillus anthracis. This was the first antibiotic compound isolated in pure and crystallised form. Though the original compound was abandoned in clinical practice due to its adverse effects, its chemical derivative mycophenolate mofetil became the drug of choice as an immunosuppressant in kidney, heart, and liver transplantations.

== Biography ==
Gosio was born in Magliano d'Alba, Piedmont, Italy. His father Giacomo Gosio, a veterinarian, died just when Bartolomeo completed his elementary education, and he was brought up by his mother Antonietta Troya. He studied medicine at the University of Turin and continued at the Royal University (Sapienza University of Rome). He received his medical degree in 1888. He was appointed at the Laboratory of Bacteriology and Chemistry of the National Hygiene Institute (Istituto Superiore di Sanità) in Rome. Then he went for further training to Max Rubner in Berlin. In 1899 he became director of the Scientific Laboratory of the Public Health Service (Laboratori Scientifici della Direzione di Sanità) in Rome until his death.

== Discovery of Gosio gas ==
In the early 1830s there was an epidemic of sudden infant deaths of unknown cause. Gosio began to investigate the cause. Suspecting the source of the epidemic as coming from the environment, he tested moulds growing inside the houses. At the time wallpapers were most commonly decorated with arsenical colours. He experimentally cultured those moulds on mashed potatoes mixed with arsenic oxide. In 1891 he correctly identified the causative agent as fumes produced by the moulds growing on the wallpapers. He isolated the fumes as mixture of highly volatile compounds, and this mixture was eventually named "Gosio gas" after him. He demonstrated that the fumes easily killed laboratory rats by paralysing their nervous system. A small mouse died within a minute of exposure. He identified several strains of moulds that could produce these toxic fumes. However, he incorrectly identified the main chemical compound as diethylarsine. (It was only in 1921 that the English chemist Frederick Challenger correctly described it as trimethylarsine, an arsine compound which was already synthesised in 1854.)

== Discovery of mycophenolic acid ==
Gosio discovered a novel antibiotic agent in 1893 from a fungus. He collected the fungus from spoiled corn and named it Penicillium glaucum. (But the species was later renamed P. brevicompactum.) In 1896 he could isolate the crystals of the compound, which he successfully demonstrated as the active antibacterial compound against the anthrax bacterium. This was the first antibiotic that was isolated in pure and crystallised form. But the discovery was forgotten. It was rediscovered by two American scientists C.L. Alsberg and O.M. Black in 1912, and gave the name mycophenolic acid. The compound was eventually demonstrated to have antiviral, antifungal, antibacterial, anticancer, and antipsoriasis activities. Although it is not commercialised as antibiotic due to its adverse effects, its modified compound (ester derivative) is an approved immunosuppressant drug in kidney, heart, and liver transplantations, and is marketed under the brands CellCept (mycophenolate mofetil; Roche) and Myfortic (mycophenolate sodium; Novartis).
