= Anthony Allison =

Anthony Allison may refer to:

- Anthony Allison (footballer) (born 1987), Liberian-born American soccer player
- Anthony Allison (politician), American politician in the New Mexico House of Representatives
- Anthony Clifford Allison (1925–2014), South African geneticist and medical scientist
