= Aspergillus pseudoglaucus =

Scientific classification
- Kingdom: Fungi
- Division: Ascomycota
- Class: Eurotiomycetes
- Order: Eurotiales
- Family: Aspergillaceae
- Genus: Aspergillus
- Species: A. pseudoglaucus

Binomial name
- Aspergillus pseudoglaucus Blochwitz (1929)

Species of fungus

Aspergillus pseudoglaucus is a species of fungus in the genus Aspergillus. It is from the Aspergillus section. The species was first described in 1929. It has been reported to produce asperentins, asperflavin, auroglaucin, bisanthrons, dihydroauroglaucin, echinulins, erythroglaucin, 6-farnesyl-5,7-dihydroxy-4-methylphthalide, flavoglaucin, isoechinulins, mycophenolic acid, neoechinulins, physcion, questin, questinol, tetracyclic, and tetrahydroauroglaucin.

== Growth and morphology ==
A. pseudoglaucus has been cultivated on both Czapek yeast extract agar (CYA) plates and yeast extract sucrose agar (YES) plates. The growth morphology of the colonies can be seen in the pictures below.

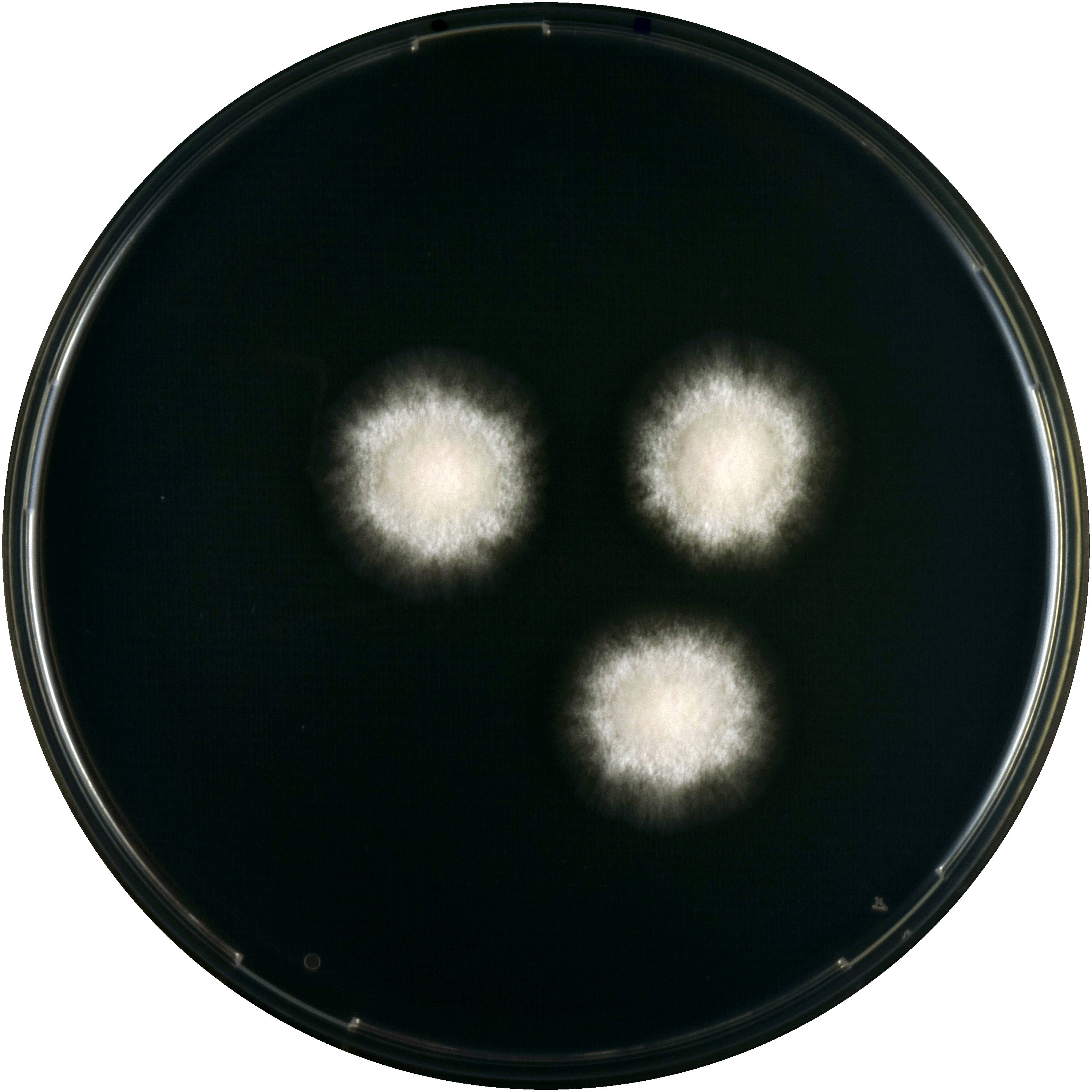
Aspergillus pseudoglaucus growing on CYA plate

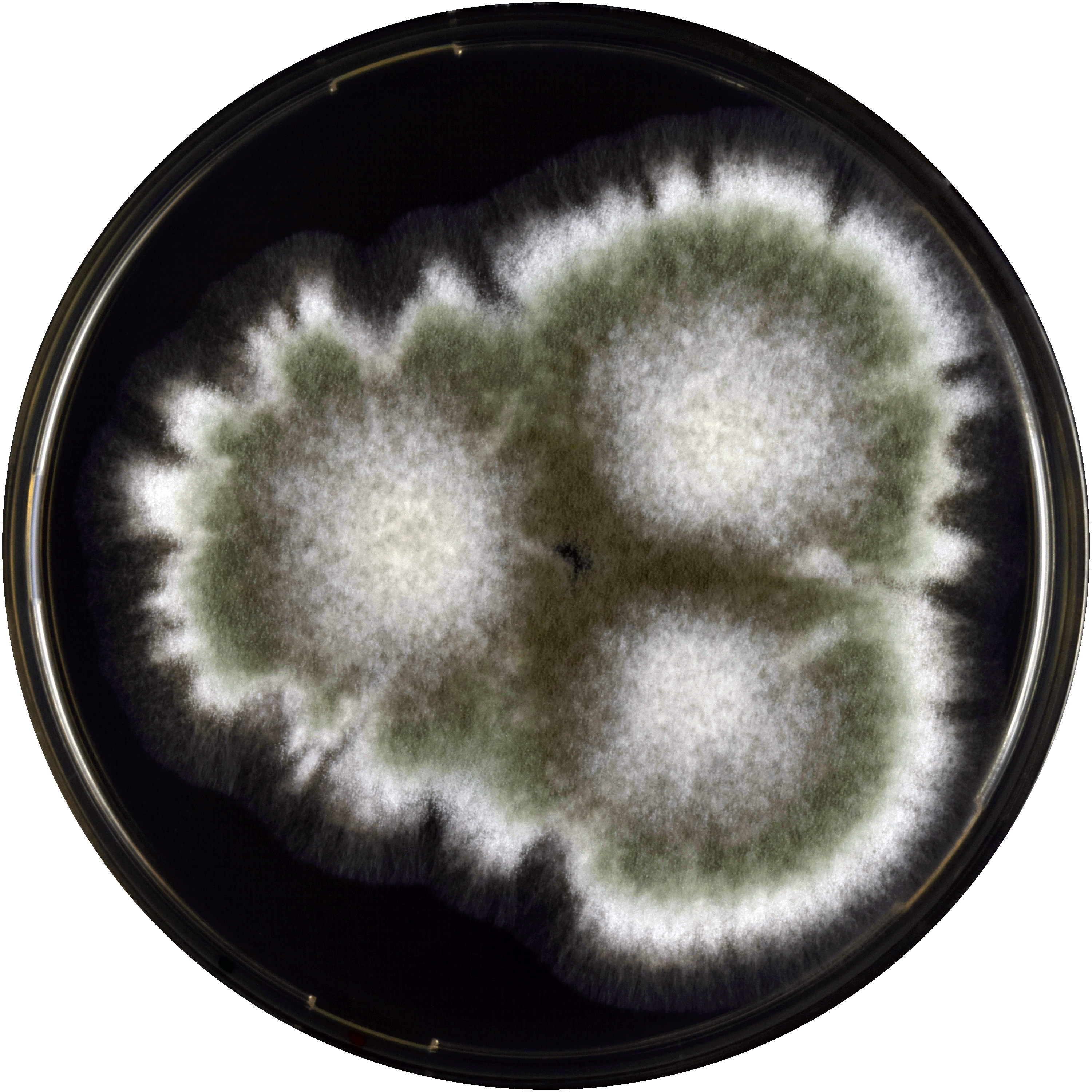
Aspergillus pseudoglaucus growing on YES plate
