= IMPDH2 =

Protein-coding gene in the species Homo sapiens

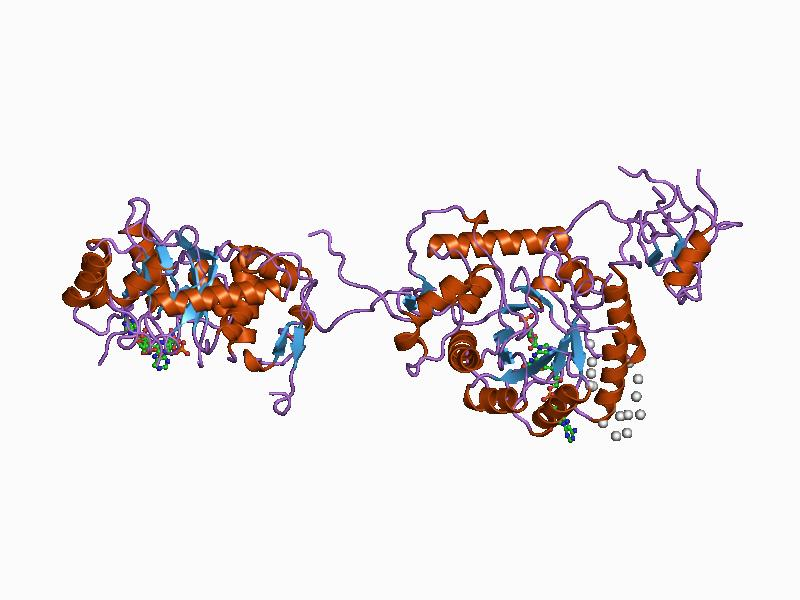

Identifiers
- Aliases: IMPDH2, IMPD2, IMPDH-II, IMP (inosine 5'-monophosphate) dehydrogenase 2, inosine monophosphate dehydrogenase 2
- External IDs: OMIM: 146691; MGI: 109367; GeneCards: IMPDH2
Available structures
PDB	Ortholog search: PDBe RCSB
PDB	List of PDB id codes 1B3O, 1NF7, 1NFB
Enzyme activity
EC #	BRENDA	ExPASy	KEGG	MetaCyc
1.1.1.205	↗	↗	↗	↗

Gene location (Human)
Chr.	Chromosome 3 (human)
Band	3p21.31	Start	49,024,325 bp
Band	3p21.31	End	49,029,447 bp

Gene location (Mouse)
Chr.	Chromosome 9 (mouse)
Band	9|9 F2	Start	108,437,485 bp
Band	9|9 F2	End	108,442,783 bp
RNA expression pattern
Bgee	Human / Mouse (ortholog); Top expressed in: left ovary; body of pancreas; cartilage tissue; right ovary; right uterine tube; gingival epithelium; ventricular zone; canal of the cervix; skin of leg; vulva / Top expressed in: morula; epiblast; uterus; ventricular zone; embryo; embryo; blastocyst; spermatid; yolk sac; ovary; More reference expression data
BioGPS	n/a
Gene ontology
Molecular function	DNA binding; metal ion binding; catalytic activity; protein binding; RNA binding; oxidoreductase activity; nucleotide binding; IMP dehydrogenase activity
Cellular component	cytoplasm; membrane; peroxisomal membrane; extracellular exosome; nucleus; extracellular region; cytosol; secretory granule lumen; ficolin-1-rich granule lumen
Biological process	cellular response to interleukin-4; purine nucleotide biosynthetic process; retina development in camera-type eye; purine ribonucleoside monophosphate biosynthetic process; lymphocyte proliferation; GMP biosynthetic process; protein homotetramerization; GTP biosynthetic process; neutrophil degranulation; circadian rhythm
Sources:Amigo / QuickGO
Orthologs
Databases	NCBI: entry; OMA: entry
Species	Human	Mouse
Entrez	3615	23918
Ensembl	ENSG00000178035	ENSMUSG00000062867
UniProt	P12268	P24547
RefSeq (mRNA)	NM_000884	NM_011830; NM_001378921
RefSeq (protein)	NP_000875	NP_035960; NP_001365850
Location (UCSC)	Chr 3: 49.02 – 49.03 Mb	Chr 9: 108.44 – 108.44 Mb
PubMed search
- Wikidata
View/Edit Human	View/Edit Mouse

Inosine-5'-monophosphate dehydrogenase 2, also known as IMP dehydrogenase 2, is an enzyme that in humans is encoded by the IMPDH2 gene.

== Function ==
IMP dehydrogenase 2 is the rate-limiting enzyme in the de novo guanine nucleotide biosynthesis. It is thus involved in maintaining cellular guanine deoxy- and ribonucleotide pools needed for DNA and RNA synthesis. IMPDH2 catalyzes the NAD-dependent oxidation of inosine-5'-monophosphate into xanthine-5'-monophosphate, which is then converted into guanosine-5'-monophosphate. IMPDH2 has been identified as an intracellular target of the natural product sanglifehrin A.

== Clinical significance ==
This gene is up-regulated in some neoplasms, suggesting it may play a role in malignant transformation.

== See also ==
- IMP dehydrogenase
