= Anthony Clifford Allison =

British geneticist (1925–2014)

- Born: 21 August 1925; East London, South Africa
- Died: 20 February 2014 (aged 88); Belmont, California, United States
- Other name: Tony Allison
- Education: University of the Witwatersrand
- Known for: Genetic resistance to malaria CellCept
- Spouses: Helen Green (divorced): Elsie M. Eugui
- Children: Miles and Joseph Mark
- Scientific career
- Fields: Medicine; Human genetics
- Workplaces: Radcliffe Infirmary; University of Oxford; International Laboratory for Research on Animal Diseases; Syntex

Anthony Clifford Allison (21 August 1925 – 20 February 2014) was a British geneticist and medical scientist who made pioneering studies on the genetic resistance to malaria. Allison undertook his primary schooling in Kenya, completed his higher education in South Africa, and obtained a BSc in medical science from the University of the Witwatersrand in 1947. He earned his PhD and medical qualification from the University of Oxford in 1950. After working at the Radcliffe Infirmary for two years, he worked as post-doctoral student to Linus Pauling in 1954. After teaching medicine for three years at Oxford, he worked at the Medical Research Council in London. In 1978 he simultaneously worked at the International Laboratory for Research on Animal Diseases (ILRAD) as its director, and at the World Health Organization's (WHO) Immunology Laboratory, both in Nairobi. He later became the Vice President for Research at Syntex Corporation (1981-1994).

While a graduate student at Oxford, Allison joined a vocational Oxford University Expedition to Mount Kenya in 1949. He first noticed from blood samples he collected that there was an unusually high occurrence of sickle-cell trait in its less harmful (heterozygous) condition. He conceived the idea that it could be an advantageous adaptation to people constantly exposed to malaria. After he completed his doctoral research at Oxford in 1953, he investigated further. In 1954 he discovered, confirming his preconception, that people with sickle-cell trait are resistant to the deadly falciparum malaria.

In the 1970s, Allison had worked out the enzyme, inosine monophosphate dehydrogenase, as a key molecule of the immune response in autoimmune diseases and in organ transplantation. Based on this, he tested the otherwise abandoned antibiotic, mycophenolate mofetil, as an inhibitor of the enzyme. After experimental success, with his wife, Elsie M. Eugui, he developed a safer derivative which was eventually approved as an immunosuppressive drug called CellCept. He contributed more than 400 technical papers and edited 12 books.

== Biography ==
Allison was born in East London, Eastern Cape, South Africa. His father was a World War I British veteran and keen polo player, who left Britain in 1919 for better farming life in East Africa. His father had a chrysanthemum farm at Mawingo in upper Gilgil, Kenya, overlooking the Great Rift Valley, where he spent most of his childhood. He entered boarding school for his primary education. He returned to South Africa for higher education and obtained his BSc in medical science at the University of the Witwatersrand in Johannesburg. In 1947 he entered Merton College, Oxford, from where he earned his DPhil with medical degree in 1952. He then found employment at the Radcliffe Infirmary, Oxford, where he worked for two years until 1954. However, most of his 1953 work was in Kenya. Receiving the George Herbert Hunt Travelling Scholarship for 1953, he joined the Nobel laureate Linus Pauling at the California Institute of Technology for post-doctoral research in 1954. He returned to England to take up teaching in medicine at University of Oxford. After three years in Oxford he was employed in the Medical Research Council in London, where he worked for twenty years. He first joined the MRC National Institute for Medical Research, and then the Clinical Research Centre. In 1978 he was appointed as Director of the International Laboratory for Research on Animal Diseases (ILRAD) in Nairobi, Kenya. He simultaneously worked at the World Health Organization's (WHO) Immunology Laboratory in Nairobi. In 1981, he became the Vice President for Research at Syntex Corporation at Palo Alto, California. As Syntex was acquired by Hoffman LaRoche in 1994, he was given retirement. He continued to teach human genetics at Stanford University and participated in many therapeutic programmes at Alavita Pharmaceuticals.

He spent his last 30 years at his home in Belmont, California. He died on 20 February 2014 as a result of complications of the end stage of pulmonary fibrosis, which he had been suffering from. He was survived by his second wife, and two sons.

=== Personal life ===
Allison developed an early interest in human evolution. Growing up in Kenya, he made close contact with paleoanthropologists such as Louis Leakey, who made important fossil discoveries at Olduvai Gorge in Tanzania. One of his teachers at University of the Witwatersrand was Raymond Dart, the discoverer of an extinct hominid Australopithecus africanus. He was strongly influenced by Charles Darwin's books, On the Origin of Species and The Descent of Man, while still a teenager. As he put it, he "became a convinced Darwinian."

Allison married Helen Green (7 February 1923 – 26 December 2011) while teaching at Oxford. After they had two sons, Miles and Joseph Mark, they soon divorced. By then Allison met an Argentinian biochemist, Elsie Eugui, a visiting scientist in his laboratory at the Clinical Research Centre. Allison found true partnership in profession as well as interest in Eugui, and married her. They were together for the rest of his life. They shared their passion in music, art, deep-sea fishing, hiking, bird-watching, and wine tasting.

== Achievements ==
=== Sickle-cell disease and resistance to malaria ===
In 1949 Allison participated in a vocational Oxford University Expedition to Mount Kenya. He took up the task of collecting blood samples from Kenyans for analyses of blood groups and genetic markers such as for sickle-cell disease. At the time it was a scientific puzzle that the disease was prevalent even though it killed people before they reached puberty, before they can have children to pass on the lethal gene. He found that the prevalence of sickle-cell trait (heterozygous condition) among people inhabiting coastal areas was higher than 20%. (At the time the highest record was 8% among African-Americans.) He was posed with the question as to why such a deadly disease (in homozygous condition) would be more prevalent in a localised area in the form of a less lethal heterozygous form. He formulated a hypothesis that it was because it had selective advantage towards malaria. Because the region was malaria endemic, acquiring a genetic mutation, but not the lethal form, could confer resistance to Plasmodium falciparum. To test his hypothesis he had to wait four years until he completed his medical course. He returned to Nairobi in 1953 to start his experiments. He selected volunteers of the Luo people, who came from malaria hyperendemic area around Lake Victoria. Under experimental infection, volunteers indicated partial resistance to malaria. Then he found children naturally infected with malaria in Buganda. He discovered that children with heterozygous trait had significantly low number of parasites in their blood. This implies further that heterozygosity in children acquired better survival rate against malaria. His final results reported in 1954 from nearly 5,000 East Africans indicated the overall picture: sickle-cell trait confers resistance to malaria.

When Allison introduced the genetic theory of malaria resistance, it was largely received with scepticism. The reason was there were observations that malaria was equally found among homozygote and heterozygote patients in some East Africans. Further it was experimentally demonstrated that malaria could be induced in African-Americans having heterozygous alleles. But Allison argued that if selective pressure would operate children between six months and four years of age are most important for population study because survival is most critical to reach reproductive stage among these children. His arguments were proved right by subsequent studies among children of East, Central, and West Africa, showing 90% protection from malaria among children with heterozygous allele.

=== CellCept ===
In the 1970s while working at the Medical Research Council, Allison had investigated the biochemical cause of immune deficiency in children. He discovered the metabolic pathway involving an enzyme, inosine monophosphate dehydrogenase, which is responsible for undesirable immune response in autoimmune diseases, as well as for immune rejection in organ transplantation. He developed an idea that if a molecule that could block the enzyme is discovered, then, it would become an immunosuppressive drug for autoimmune diseases and organ transplantation. In 1981, he decided to go for drug discovery and approached several pharmaceutical companies, which turned him down one by one as he had no primary knowledge on drug research. However, Syntex liked his plans and asked him to join the company with his wife. He became vice president for Research. In one of their experiments the Allisons used an antibacterial compound, mycophenolate mofetil, which was abandoned in clinical use due to its adverse effects. They discovered that the compound had immunosuppressive activity. They synthesised a chemical variant for increased activity and reduced adverse effects. They subsequently demonstrated that it was useful in organ transplantation in experimental rats. After successful clinical trials, the compound was approved for use in kidney transplant by the US Food and Drug Administration on 3 May 1995, and was commercialised under the brand name CellCept.

== Controversy ==
In 1982 Allison and Eugui reported in the Christmas issue of The Lancet the discovery of immunity to malarial parasite (Plasmodium falciparum) by production of free oxygen radicals in the immune system. A quick response came from Ian Clark, former PhD student of Allison, and W.B. Cowden and G.A. Butcher, both of the University of Newcastle Medical School in New South Wales, who claimed that the scientific ideas were originally theirs, and accused Allison of stealing the idea. Clark further stated that he had developed the concept back in the spring of 1982, and submitted his report to Nature, which rejected it because it was considered "out-of-purview" of the journal. Clark eventually published his work in the January issue of Infection and Immunity. In August 1982, Clark had given Allison a draft copy of his manuscript; Allison's own experimental result was published in December. Reacting to the accusation, Allison explained that his experiment was independent of Clark's, and returned the accusation that while Clark was his student, he had claimed two works as his own, which were not. It was generally agreed that the original idea was that of Clark's. A reconciliation paper was published in February 1983, jointly written by all the scientists involved.
