= IMPDH1 =

Protein-coding gene in the species Homo sapiens

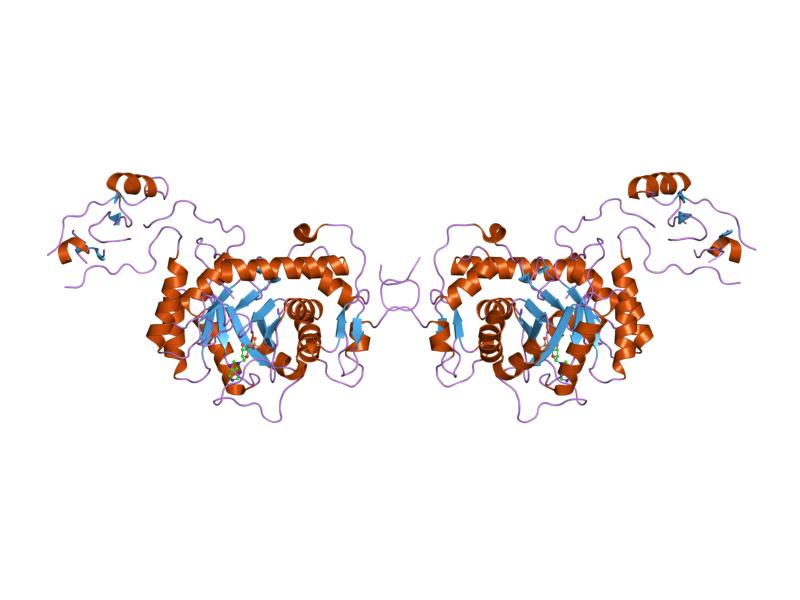

Identifiers
- Aliases: IMPDH1, IMPD, IMPD1, IMPDH-I, LCA11, RP10, sWSS2608, IMP (inosine 5'-monophosphate) dehydrogenase 1, inosine monophosphate dehydrogenase 1
- External IDs: OMIM: 146690; MGI: 96567; GeneCards: IMPDH1
Available structures
PDB	Ortholog search: PDBe RCSB
PDB	List of PDB id codes 1JCN
Enzyme activity
EC #	BRENDA	ExPASy	KEGG	MetaCyc
1.1.1.205	↗	↗	↗	↗

Gene location (Human)
Chr.	Chromosome 7 (human)
Band	7q32.1	Start	128,392,277 bp
Band	7q32.1	End	128,410,252 bp

Gene location (Mouse)
Chr.	Chromosome 6 (mouse)
Band	6|6 A3.3	Start	29,200,433 bp
Band	6|6 A3.3	End	29,216,363 bp
RNA expression pattern
Bgee	Human / Mouse (ortholog); Top expressed in: granulocyte; monocyte; body of stomach; stromal cell of endometrium; blood; spleen; gastric mucosa; apex of heart; tibial nerve; upper lobe of left lung / Top expressed in: neural layer of retina; olfactory epithelium; thymus; retinal pigment epithelium; morula; superior frontal gyrus; lumbar spinal ganglion; dentate gyrus of hippocampal formation granule cell; primary visual cortex; embryo; More reference expression data
BioGPS	n/a
Gene ontology
Molecular function	metal ion binding; catalytic activity; RNA binding; nucleic acid binding; oxidoreductase activity; DNA binding; IMP dehydrogenase activity; nucleotide binding
Cellular component	cytoplasm; nucleus; extracellular region; cytosol; secretory granule lumen; azurophil granule lumen; ficolin-1-rich granule lumen
Biological process	purine nucleotide biosynthetic process; purine ribonucleoside monophosphate biosynthetic process; lymphocyte proliferation; GMP biosynthetic process; GTP biosynthetic process; neutrophil degranulation
Sources:Amigo / QuickGO
Orthologs
Databases	NCBI: entry; OMA: entry
Species	Human	Mouse
Entrez	3614	23917
Ensembl	ENSG00000106348	ENSMUSG00000003500
UniProt	P20839	P50096
RefSeq (mRNA)	NM_000883; NM_001102605; NM_001142573; NM_001142574; NM_001142575 NM_001142576; NM_001304521; NM_183243	NM_011829; NM_001302933; NM_001302934
RefSeq (protein)	NP_000874; NP_001096075; NP_001136045; NP_001136046; NP_001136047 NP_001136048; NP_001291450; NP_899066	NP_001289862; NP_001289863; NP_035959
Location (UCSC)	Chr 7: 128.39 – 128.41 Mb	Chr 6: 29.2 – 29.22 Mb
PubMed search
- Wikidata
View/Edit Human	View/Edit Mouse

Inosine-5'-monophosphate dehydrogenase 1, also known as IMP dehydrogenase 1, is an enzyme that in humans is encoded by the IMPDH1 gene.

== Function ==
IMP dehydrogenase 1 acts as a homotetramer to regulate cell growth. IMPDH1 is an enzyme that catalyzes the synthesis of xanthine monophosphate (XMP) from inosine-5'-monophosphate (IMP). This is the rate-limiting step in the de novo synthesis of guanine nucleotides.

== Clinical significance ==
Defects in the IMPDH1 gene are a cause of retinitis pigmentosa type 10 (RP10).

== See also ==
- IMP dehydrogenase
