= Sanglifehrin =

Sanglifehrin A
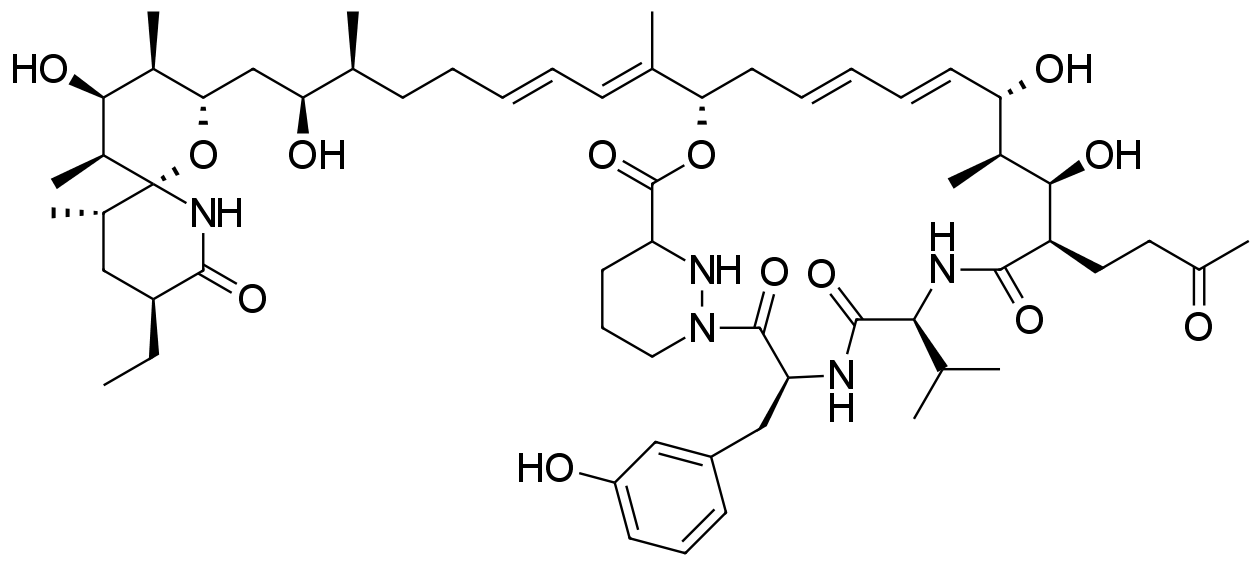
- Sanglifehrin A

Names
- Systematic IUPAC name (3S,6S,9R,10R,11S,12S,13E,15E,18S,21S)-18-{(2E,4E,8S,9S)-10-[(2S,3R,4S,5S,6R,9S,11S)-9-Ethyl-4-hydroxy-3,5,11-trimethyl-8-oxo-1-oxa-7-azaspiro[5.5]undec-2-yl]-9-hydroxy-8-methyl-2,4-decadien-2-yl}-10, 12-dihydroxy-3-(3-hydroxybenzyl)-6-isopropyl-11-methyl-9-(3-oxobutyl)-19-oxa-1,4,7,25-tetraazabicyclo[19.3.1]pentacosa-13,15-diene-2,5,8,20-tetrone

Identifiers
CAS Number	187148-13-6
3D model (JSmol)	Interactive image
ChEMBL	ChEMBL410807
ChemSpider	21395338
DrugBank	DB03393
PubChem CID	5388925
CompTox Dashboard (EPA)	DTXSID101022539
- InChI: InChI=1S/C33H55NO8/c1-10-11-12-20(4)31(42-33(34)40)24(8)29(37)22(6)16-18(2)15-21(5)28(36)19(3)13-14-26(35)17-27-23(7)30(38)25(9)32(39)41-27/h10-15,19-31,35-38H,1,16-17H2,2-9H3,(H2,34,40)/b12-11-,14-13-,18-15-/t19-,20-,21-,22-,23-,24-,25+,26+,27-,28-,29+,30-,31-/m0/s1; InChI=1S/C60H91N5O13/c1-11-43-30-37(6)60(63-55(43)72)41(10)53(70)40(9)51(78-60)33-49(69)35(4)20-14-12-15-21-36(5)50-26-17-13-16-25-48(68)39(8)54(71)45(28-27-38(7)66)56(73)62-52(34(2)3)57(74)61-47(32-42-22-18-23-44(67)31-42)58(75)65-29-19-24-46(64-65)59(76)77-50/h12-13,15-18,21-23,25,31,34-35,37,39-41,43,45-54,64,67-71H,11,14,19-20,24,26-30,32-33H2,1-10H3,(H,61,74)(H,62,73)(H,63,72)/b15-12+,17-13+,25-16+,36-21+/t35-,37-,39-,40-,41-,43-,45+,46-,47-,48-,49-,50-,51-,52-,53-,54+,60+/m0/s1 Key: ONJZYZYZIKTIEG-CFBQITSMSA-N
- SMILES: CCC1CC(C2(C(C(C(C(O2)CC(C(C)CCC=CC=C(C)C3CC=CC=CC(C(C(C(C(=O)NC(C(=O)NC(C(=O)N4CCCC(N4)C(=O)O3)CC5=CC(=CC=C5)O)C(C)C)CCC(=O)C)O)C)O)O)C)O)C)NC1=O)C

Properties
Chemical formula	C_{60}H_{91}N_{5}O_{13}
Molar mass	1090.4 g/mol
- Except where otherwise noted, data are given for materials in their standard state (at 25 °C [77 °F], 100 kPa). Infobox references

Sanglifehrin A is a polyketide natural product found to potently inhibit cyclophilins and have immunosuppressive activity.

== History ==
Isolation and characterisation of Sanglifehrins, produced by fermentation of Streptomyces sp. A92-308110 was first published by JJ Sanglier and T Fehr in 1999.

== Structure ==
Sanglifehrins are mixed polyketide / non-ribosomal peptides, and their biosynthesis requires a modular type I polyketide synthase, with one module of non-ribosomal peptide synthetase, which incorporates phenylalanine, later converted by a hydroxylase to meta-tyrosine.

== See also ==
- Rapamycin
- Epothilone
