= Mycophenolic acid =

Immunosuppressant medication

- Molecular structure of mycophenolic acid

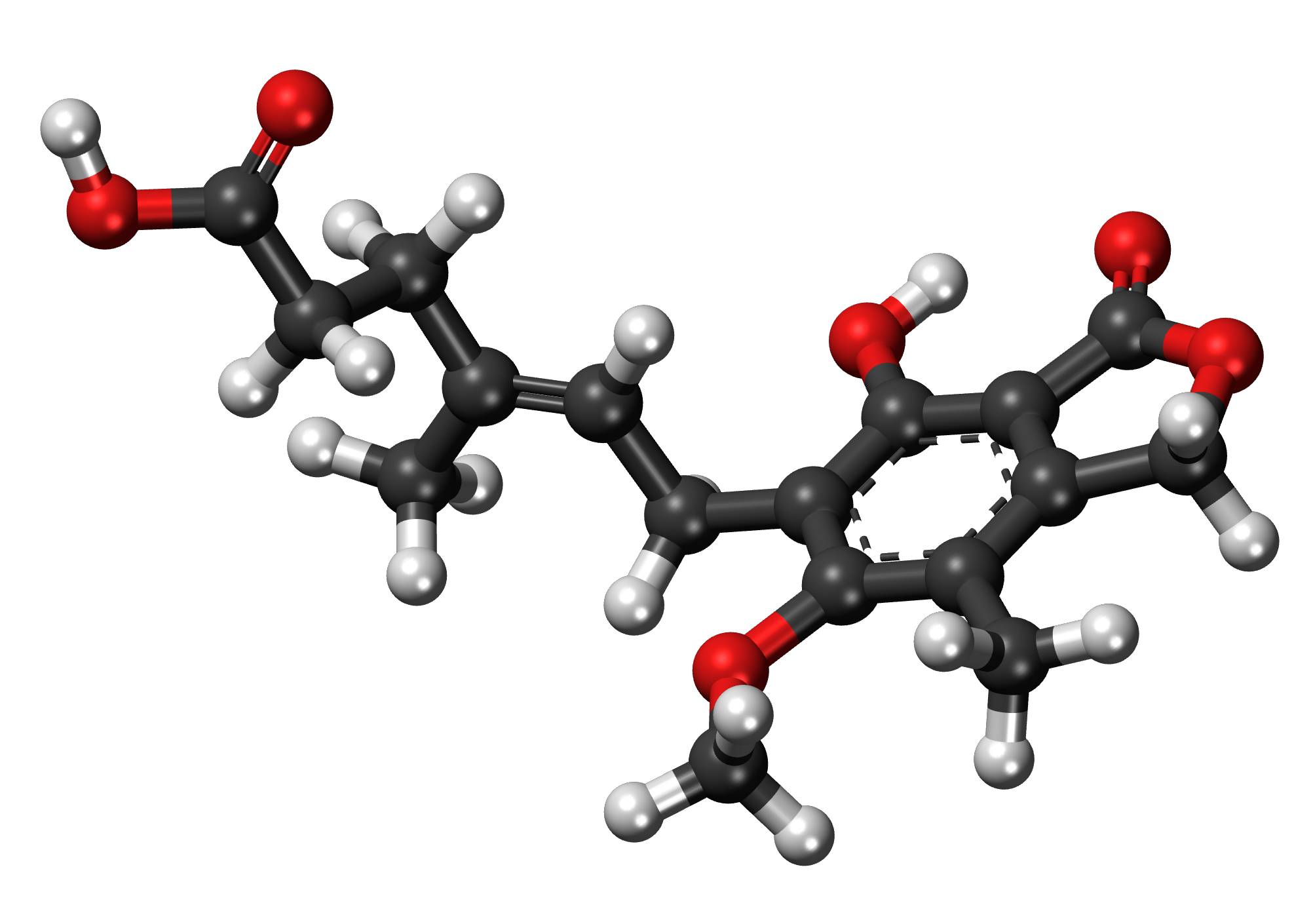
- 3D representation of mycophenolic acid

Clinical data
- Pronunciation: /ˌmaɪkoʊfɪˈnɒlɪk/
- Trade names: Cellcept, Myfortic, Myhibbin, others
- Other names: MPA, Mycophenolate sodium, Mycophenolate mofetil (AAN AU), Mycophenolate mofetil (USAN US)
- AHFS/Drugs.com: Monograph
- MedlinePlus: a601081
- License data: US DailyMed: Mycophenolate mofetil
- Pregnancy category: AU: D
- Routes of administration: By mouth, intravenous
- ATC code: mycophenolic acid: L04AA06 (WHO)

Legal status
- Legal status: AU: S4 (Prescription only); CA: ℞-only; UK: POM (Prescription only); US: ℞-only; EU: Rx-only; In general: ℞ (Prescription only)

Pharmacokinetic data
- Bioavailability: 72% (sodium), 94% (mofetil)
- Protein binding: 82–97%
- Metabolism: Liver
- Elimination half-life: 17.9±6.5 hours
- Excretion: Urine (93%), faeces (6%)

Identifiers
- IUPAC name: (4E)-6-(4-Hydroxy-6-methoxy-7-methyl-3-oxo-1,3-dihydro-2-benzofuran-5-yl)-4-methylhex-4-enoic acid
- CAS Number: mycophenolic acid: 24280-93-1 128794-94-5 (mofetil ester),37415-62-6 (sodium salt)
- PubChem CID: mycophenolic acid: 446541
- IUPHAR/BPS: mycophenolic acid: 6832
- DrugBank: mycophenolic acid: DB01024
- ChemSpider: mycophenolic acid: 393865
- UNII: mycophenolic acid: HU9DX48N0T
- KEGG: mycophenolic acid: D05096
- ChEBI: mycophenolic acid: CHEBI:168396
- ChEMBL: mycophenolic acid: ChEMBL866
- CompTox Dashboard (EPA): mycophenolic acid: DTXSID4041070
- ECHA InfoCard: 100.041.912

Chemical and physical data
- Formula: C_{17}H_{20}O_{6}
- Molar mass: 320.341 g·mol^{−1}
- 3D model (JSmol): mycophenolic acid: Interactive image; mofetil ester: Interactive image
- Melting point: 141 °C (286 °F)
- SMILES: mycophenolic acid: O=C1OCc2c1c(O)c(c(OC)c2C)C\C=C(/C)CCC(=O)O; mofetil ester: COc1c(C)c2c(c(O)c1C/C=C(\C)CCC(=O)OCCN1CCOCC1)C(=O)OC2
- InChI: mycophenolic acid: InChI=1S/C17H20O6/c1-9(5-7-13(18)19)4-6-11-15(20)14-12(8-23-17(14)21)10(2)16(11)22-3/h4,20H,5-8H2,1-3H3,(H,18,19)/b9-4+; Key:HPNSFSBZBAHARI-RUDMXATFSA-N; mofetil ester: InChI=1S/C23H31NO7/c1-15(5-7-19(25)30-13-10-24-8-11-29-12-9-24)4-6-17-21(26)20-18(14-31-23(20)27)16(2)22(17)28-3/h4,26H,5-14H2,1-3H3/b15-4+; Key:RTGDFNSFWBGLEC-SYZQJQIISA-N

Mycophenolic acid is an immunosuppressant medication used to prevent rejection following organ transplantation and to treat autoimmune conditions such as Crohn's disease, lupus and myasthenia gravis. Specifically it is used following kidney, heart, and liver transplantation. It can be given by mouth or by injection into a vein. It comes as mycophenolate sodium and mycophenolate mofetil.

Common side effects include nausea, infections, and diarrhea. Other serious side effects include an increased risk of cancer, progressive multifocal leukoencephalopathy, anemia, and gastrointestinal bleeding. Use during pregnancy may harm the baby. It works by blocking inosine monophosphate dehydrogenase (IMPDH), which is needed by lymphocytes to make guanosine.

Mycophenolic acid was initially discovered by Italian Bartolomeo Gosio in 1893. It was rediscovered in 1945 and 1968. It was approved for medical use in the United States in 1995 following the discovery of its immunosuppressive properties in the 1990s. It is available as a generic medication. In 2022, it was the 227th most commonly prescribed medication in the United States, with more than 1 million prescriptions.

== Medical uses ==
=== Organ transplant ===
Mycophenolate is used for the prevention of organ transplant rejection. Mycophenolate mofetil is indicated for the prevention of organ transplant rejection in adults and kidney transplantation rejection in children over 2 years; whereas mycophenolate sodium is indicated for the prevention of kidney transplant rejection in adults. Mycophenolate sodium has also been used for the prevention of rejection in liver, heart, or lung transplants in children older than two years.

=== Autoimmune disease ===
Mycophenolate is increasingly utilized as a steroid sparing treatment in autoimmune diseases and similar immune-mediated disorders including Behçet's disease, pemphigus vulgaris, immunoglobulin A nephropathy, small vessel vasculitides, and psoriasis. It is also used for retroperitoneal fibrosis along with a number of other medications. Specifically it has also been used for psoriasis not treatable by other methods.

Its increasing application in treating lupus nephritis has demonstrated more frequent complete response and less frequent complications compared to cyclophosphamide bolus therapy, a regimen with risk of bone marrow suppression, infertility, and malignancy. Further work addressing maintenance therapy demonstrated mycophenolate superior to cyclophosphamide, again in terms of response and side-effects. Walsh proposed that mycophenolate should be considered as a first-line induction therapy for treatment of lupus nephritis in people without kidney dysfunction.

=== Comparison to other agents ===
Compared with azathioprine it has higher incidence of diarrhea, and no difference in risk of any of the other side effects in transplant patients. Mycophenolic acid is 15 times more expensive than azathioprine.

== Adverse effects ==
Common adverse drug reactions (≥ 1% of people) include diarrhea, nausea, vomiting, joint pain; infections, leukopenia, or anemia reflect the immunosuppressive and myelosuppressive nature of the drug. Mycophenolate sodium is also commonly associated with fatigue, headache, cough and/or breathing issues. Intravenous (IV) administration of mycophenolate mofetil is also commonly associated with thrombophlebitis and thrombosis. Infrequent adverse effects (0.1–1% of people) include esophagitis, gastritis, gastrointestinal tract hemorrhage, and/or invasive cytomegalovirus (CMV) infection. More rarely, pulmonary fibrosis or various neoplasia occur: melanoma, lymphoma, other malignancies having an occurrences of 1 in 20 to 1 in 200, depending on the type, with neoplasia in the skin being the most common site. Several cases of pure red cell aplasia (PRCA) have also been reported.

The U.S. Food and Drug Administration (FDA) issued an alert that people are at increased risk of opportunistic infections, such as activation of latent viral infections, including shingles, other herpes infections, cytomegalovirus, and BK virus associated nephropathy. In addition the FDA is investigating 16 people that developed a rare neurological disease while taking the drug. This is a viral infection known as progressive multifocal leukoencephalopathy; it attacks the brain and is usually fatal.

=== Pregnancy ===
Mycophenolic acid is associated with miscarriage and congenital malformations when used during pregnancy, and should be avoided whenever possible by women trying to get pregnant.

=== Blood tests ===
Among the most common effects of this drug is increased blood cholesterol levels. Other changes in blood chemistry such as hypomagnesemia, hypocalcemia, hyperkalemia, and an increase in blood urea nitrogen (BUN) can occur.

== Mechanism of action ==
Purines (including the nucleosides guanosine and adenosine) can either be synthesized de novo using ribose 5-phosphate or they can be salvaged from free nucleotides. Mycophenolic acid is a potent, reversible, non-competitive inhibitor of inosine-5′-monophosphate dehydrogenase (IMPDH), an enzyme essential to the de novo synthesis of guanosine-5'-monophosphate (GMP) from inosine-5'-monophosphate (IMP). IMPDH inhibition particularly affects lymphocytes since they rely almost exclusively on de novo purine synthesis. In contrast, many other cell types use both pathways, and some cells, such as terminally differentiated neurons, depend completely on purine nucleotide salvage. Thus, use of mycophenolic acid leads to a relatively selective inhibition of DNA replication in T cells and B cells.

== Pharmacology ==
Mycophenolate can be derived from the fungi Penicillium stoloniferum, P. brevicompactum and P. echinulatum. Mycophenolate mofetil is metabolised in the liver to the active moiety mycophenolic acid. It reversibly inhibits inosine monophosphate dehydrogenase, the enzyme that controls the rate of synthesis of guanine monophosphate in the de novo pathway of purine synthesis used in the proliferation of B and T lymphocytes. Other cells recover purines via a separate salvage pathway and are thus able to escape the effect.

Mycophenolate is potent and can, in many contexts, be used in place of the older anti-proliferative azathioprine. It is usually used as part of a three-compound regimen of immunosuppressants, also including a calcineurin inhibitor (ciclosporin or tacrolimus) and a glucocorticoid (e.g. dexamethasone or prednisone).

== Chemistry ==
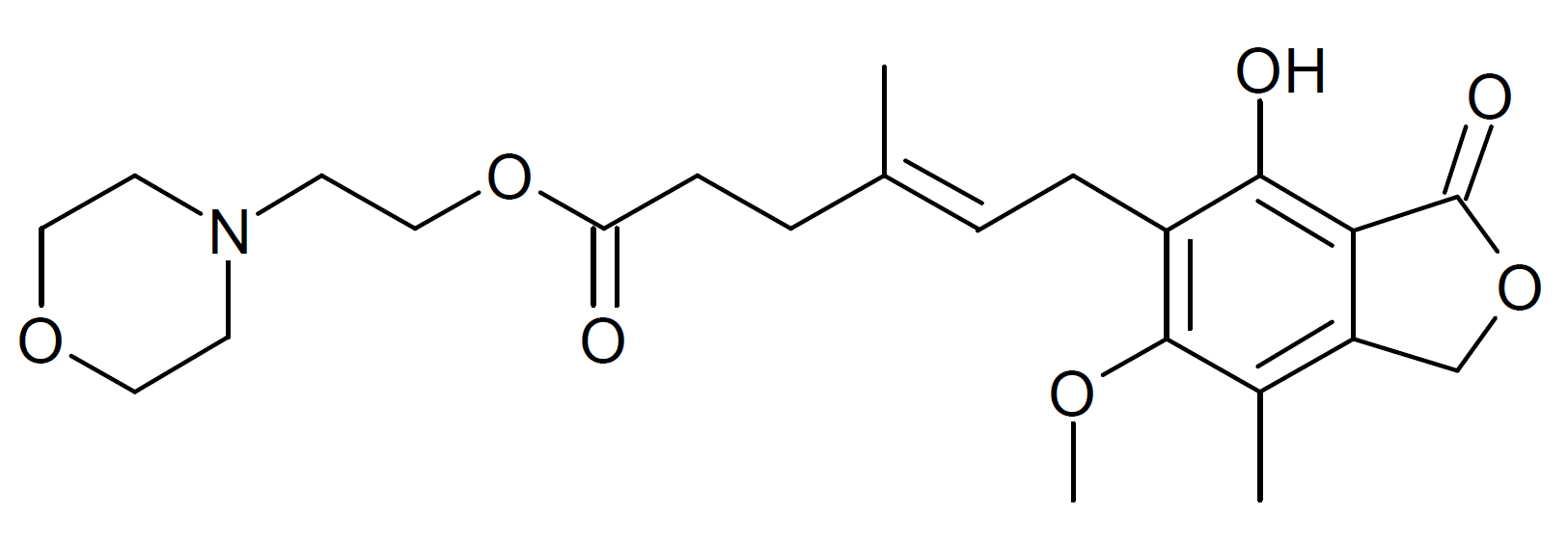
Mycophenolate mofetil, a prodrug form of mycophenolic acid used in medicine

Mycophenolate mofetil is the morpholino‌ ethyl ester of mycophenolic acid; the ester masks the carboxyl group. Mycophenolate mofetil is reported to have a pKa values of 5.6 for the morpholino moiety and 8.5 for the phenolic group.

== History ==
Mycophenolic acid was discovered by Italian medical scientist Bartolomeo Gosio. Gosio collected a fungus from spoiled corn and named it Penicillium glaucum. (The species is now called P. brevicompactum.) In 1893 he found that the fungus had antibacterial activity. In 1896 he isolated crystals of the compound, which he successfully demonstrated as the active antibacterial compound against the anthrax bacterium. This was the first antibiotic that was isolated in pure and crystalline form. But the discovery was forgotten. It was rediscovered by two American scientists C.L. Alsberg and O.M. Black in 1912, and given the name mycophenolic acid. The compound was eventually demonstrated to have antiviral, antifungal, antibacterial, anticancer, and antipsoriasis activities. Although it is not commercialised as antibiotic due to its adverse effects, its modified compound (ester derivative) is an approved immunosuppressant drug in kidney, heart, and liver transplantations, and is marketed under the brands Cellcept (mycophenolate mofetil by Roche) and Myfortic (mycophenolate sodium by Novartis).

Cellcept was developed by a South African geneticist Anthony Allison and his wife Elsie M. Eugui. In the 1970s while working at the Medical Research Council, Allison investigated the biochemical causes of immune deficiency in children. He discovered the metabolic pathway involving an enzyme, inosine monophosphate dehydrogenase, which is responsible for undesirable immune response in autoimmune diseases, as well as for immune rejection in organ transplantation. He conceived an idea that if a molecule that could block the enzyme is discovered, it could become an immunosuppressive drug that could be used for autoimmune diseases and in organ transplantation. In 1981 he decided to go for drug discovery and approached several pharmaceutical companies, which turned him down one by one as he had no primary knowledge of drug research. However, Syntex liked his plans and asked him to join the company with his wife. He became vice president for the research. In one of their experiments the Allisons used an antibacterial compound, mycophenolate mofetil, which was abandoned in clinical use due to its adverse effects. They discovered that the compound had immunosuppressive activity. They synthesised a chemical variant for increased activity and reduced adverse effects. They subsequently demonstrated that it was useful in organ transplantation in experimental rats. After successful clinical trials, the compound was approved for use in kidney transplant by the U.S. Food and Drug Administration on 3 May 1995, and was sold under the brand name Cellcept. It was approved for use in the European Union in February 1996.

== Names ==
It was initially introduced as the prodrug mycophenolate mofetil (MMF, brand name Cellcept) to improve oral bioavailability. The salt mycophenolate sodium has also been introduced. Enteric-coated mycophenolate sodium (EC-MPS) is an alternative MPA formulation.

MMF and EC-MPS appear to be equal in benefits and safety.

== Research ==
Mycophenolate mofetil is beginning to be used in the management of auto-immune disorders such as idiopathic thrombocytopenic purpura (ITP), systemic lupus erythematosus (SLE), scleroderma (systemic sclerosis or SSc), and pemphigus vulgaris (PV) with success for some patients.

It is also being used as a long-term therapy for maintaining remission of granulomatosis with polyangiitis, though thus far, studies have found it inferior to azathioprine. A combination of mycophenolate and ribavirin has been found to stop infection by and replication of dengue virus in vitro. It has also shown promising antiviral activity against MERS, especially in combination with interferon.

Preliminary data suggest that mycophenolate mofetil might have benefits in people with multiple sclerosis. However the evidence is insufficient to determine the effects as an add‐on therapy for interferon beta-1a in people with RRMS.

== See also ==
- Tacrolimus
