= Inosine-5′-monophosphate dehydrogenase =

Class of enzymes

Inosine 5'-monophosphate dehydrogenase
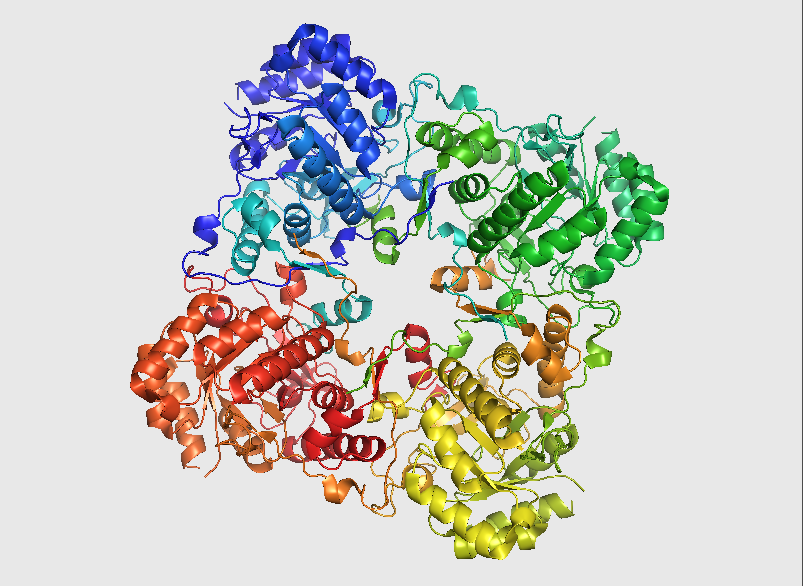
- Structure of IMPDH

Identifiers
- EC no.: 1.1.1.205
- CAS no.: 9028-93-7

Databases
- BRENDA: enzyme data
- ExPASy: NiceZyme view
- KEGG: enzyme entry
- MetaCyc: metabolic pathway
- Rhea: reactions
- PDB structures: RCSB PDB PDBe PDBsum
- Gene Ontology: AmiGO / QuickGO
Search
- PMC: articles
- PubMed: articles
- NCBI: proteins

Inosine 5′-monophosphate dehydrogenase (IMPDH) is a purine biosynthetic enzyme that catalyzes the nicotinamide adenine dinucleotide (NAD^{+})-dependent oxidation of inosine monophosphate (IMP) to xanthosine monophosphate (XMP), the first committed and rate-limiting step towards the de novo biosynthesis of guanine nucleotides from IMP. IMPDH is a regulator of the intracellular guanine nucleotide pool, and is therefore important for DNA and RNA synthesis, signal transduction, energy transfer, glycoprotein synthesis, as well as other processes that are involved in cellular proliferation.

== Structure and function ==
The canonical monomeric form of IMPDH has a molecular mass of approximately 55 kDa and generally consists of 400-500 residues. IMPDHs have been described as tetrameric, although further data validated the existence of octameric forms.

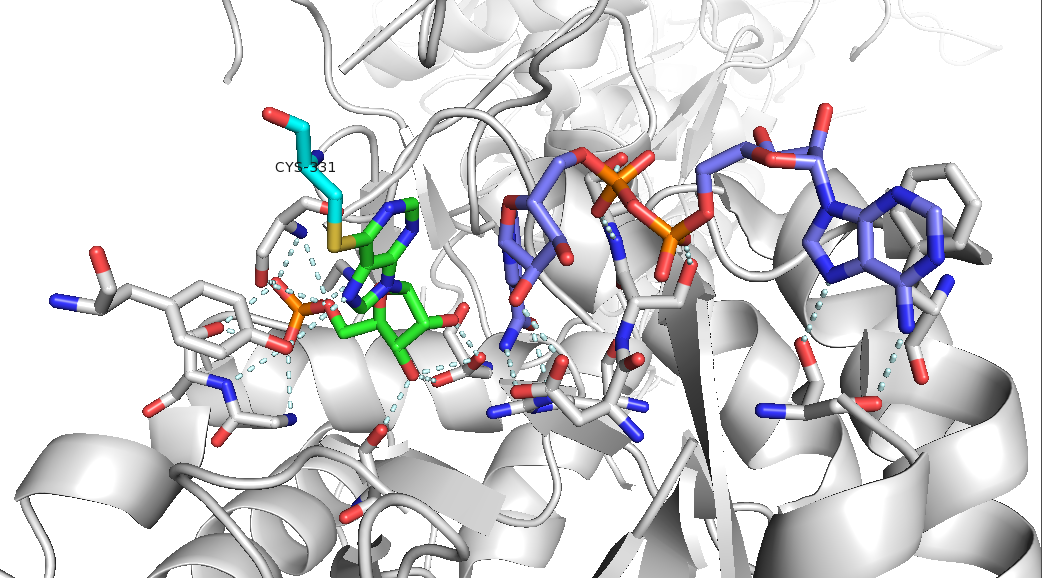
Visual representation of the active site with IMP (green) and NAD (purple) bound. Key residues (white) of the protein and the catalytic cysteine (cyan) are shown. Dashed lines represent polar contacts.

Most IMPDH monomers contain two domains: a catalytic (β/α)_{8} barrel domain with an active site located in the loops at the C-terminal end of the barrel, and a subdomain, named the Bateman domain, and consisting of two, repeated cystathionine beta synthetase (CBS) domains that are inserted within the dehydrogenase sequence. Monovalent cations have been shown to activate most IMPDH enzymes and may serve to stabilize the conformation of the active-site loop.

The Bateman domain is not required for catalytic activity. Mutations within the Bateman domain or a complete deletion of the domain do not impair the in vitro catalytic activity of some IMPDH . Other deletion examples of the Bateman domain in IMPDH have shown an enhanced in vitro catalytic activity in comparison with the corresponding wild-type counterpart. An in vivo deletion of the Bateman domain in E. coli suggests that the domain can act as a negative transregulator of adenine nucleotide synthesis. IMPDH has also been shown to bind nucleic acids, and this function can be impaired by mutations that are located in the Bateman domain. The Bateman domain has also been implicated in mediating IMPDH association with polyribosomes, which suggests a potential moonlighting role for IMPDH as a translational regulatory protein. In Staphylococcus aureus, IMPDH have been identified as a plasminogen-binding protein. Drosophila IMPDH has been demonstrated to act as a sequence-specific transcriptional repressor that can reduce the expression of histone genes and E2F. IMPDH localizes to the nucleus at the end of the S phase and nuclear accumulation is mostly restricted to the G2 phase. In addition, metabolic stress has been shown to induce the nuclear localization of IMPDH.

== Mechanism ==
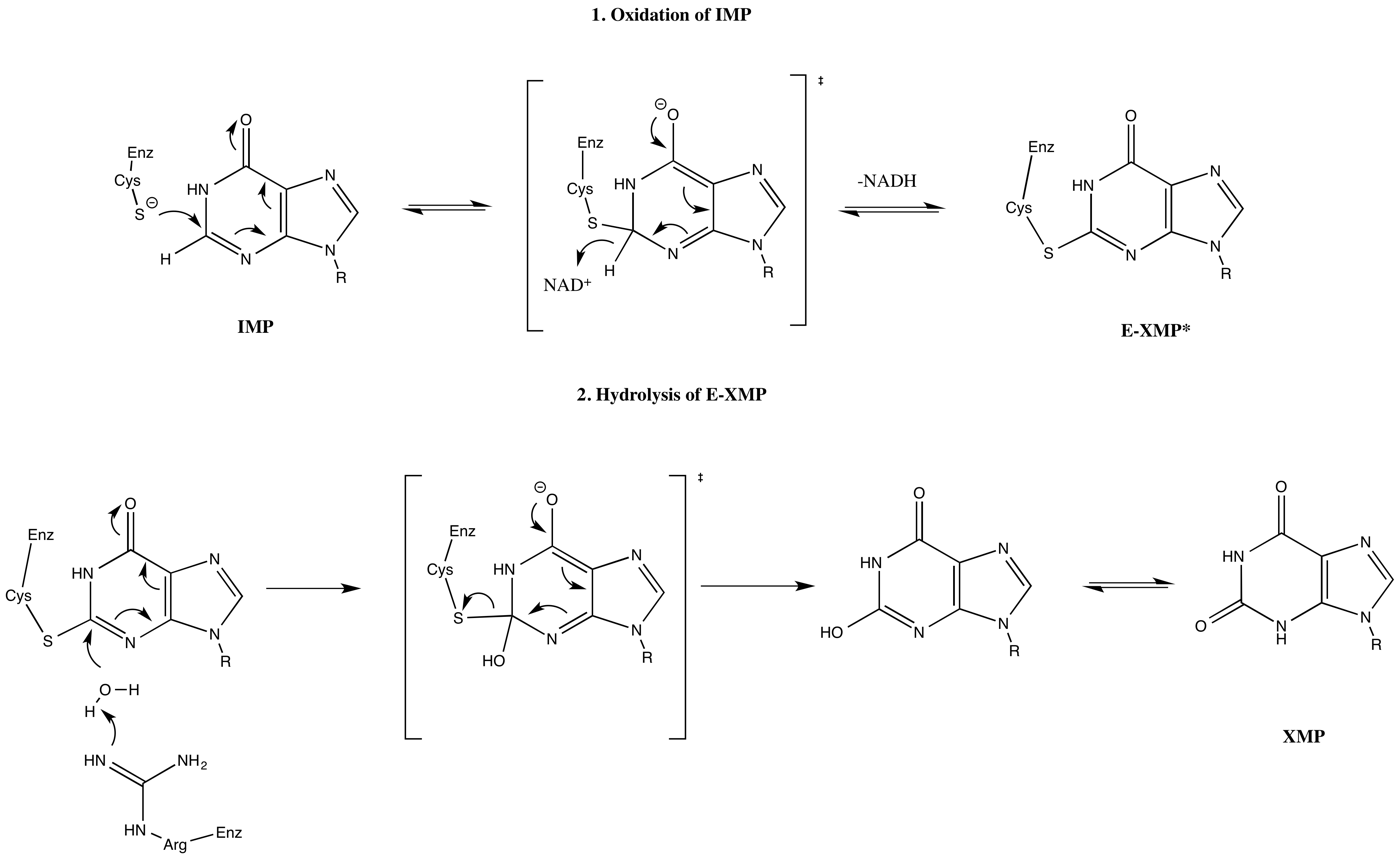
General mechanism used by the enzyme IMPDH to convert IMP to XMP. Only the purine portion of each molecule is shown.

The overall reaction catalyzed by IMPDH is:

inosine 5'-phosphate + NAD^{+} + H_{2}O $\rightleftharpoons$ xanthosine 5'-phosphate + NADH + H^{+}

The mechanism of IMPDH involves a sequence of two different chemical reactions: (1) a fast redox reaction involving a hydride transfer to NAD^{+} which generates NADH and an enzyme-bound XMP intermediate (E-XMP*) and (2) a hydrolysis step that releases XMP from the enzyme. IMP binds to the active site and a conserved cysteine residue attacks the 2-position of the purine ring. A hydride ion is then transferred from the C2 position to NAD^{+} and the E-XMP* intermediate is formed. NADH dissociates from the enzyme and a mobile active-site flap element moves a conserved catalytic dyad of arginine and threonine into the newly unoccupied NAD binding site. The arginine residue is thought to act as the general base that activates a water molecule for the hydrolysis reaction. Alternatively, molecular mechanics simulations suggest that in conditions where the arginine residue is protonated, the threonine residue is also capable of activating water by accepting a proton from water while transferring its own proton to a nearby residue.

IMP dehydrogenase 1

Identifiers
- Symbol: IMPDH1
- Alt. symbols: RP10
- NCBI gene: 3614
- HGNC: 6052
- OMIM: 146690
- RefSeq: NM_000883
- UniProt: P20839

Other data
- EC number: 1.1.1.205
- Locus: Chr. 7 q31.3-q32
Search for
- Structures: Swiss-model
- Domains: InterPro

== In humans ==
IMP dehydrogenase 2
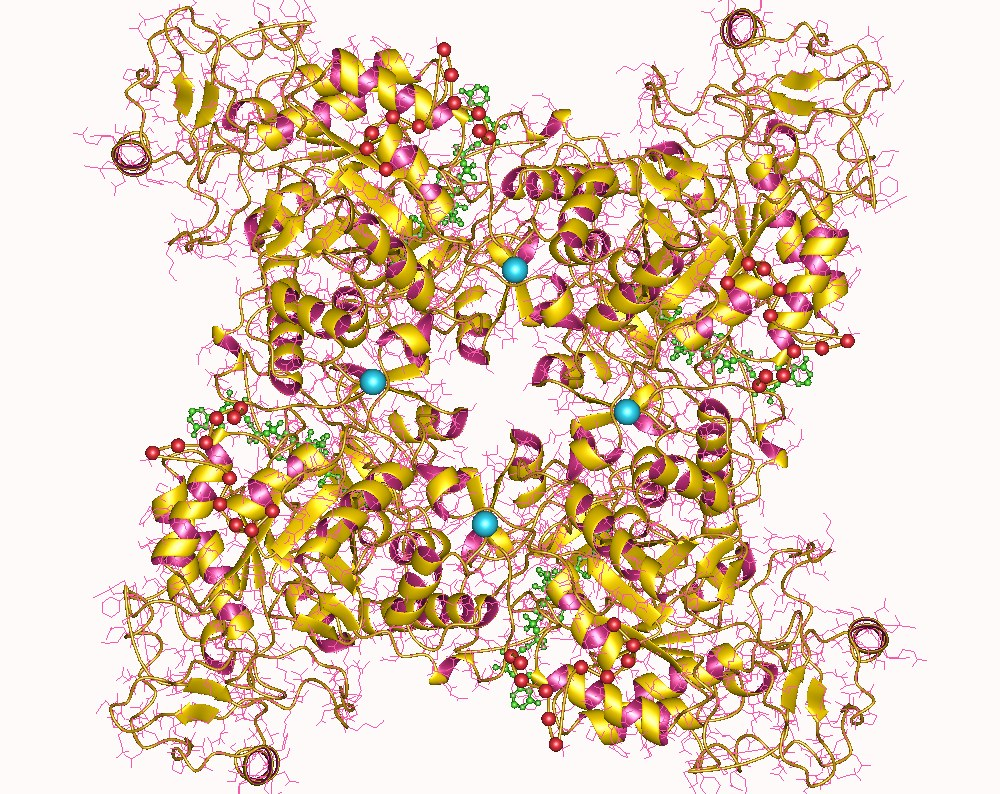
- IMP dehydrogenase 2 homotetramer, Human

Identifiers
- Symbol: IMPDH2
- Alt. symbols: IMPD2
- NCBI gene: 3615
- HGNC: 6053
- OMIM: 146691
- RefSeq: NM_000884
- UniProt: P12268

Other data
- EC number: 1.1.1.205
- Locus: Chr. 3 p21.2
Search for
- Structures: Swiss-model
- Domains: InterPro

Humans express two distinct isozymes of IMPDH encoded by two distinct genes, IMPDH1 and IMPDH2.

Both isozymes contain 514 residues, have an 84% similarity in peptide sequence, and have similar kinetic properties. Both isozymes are constitutively expressed in most tissues, but IMPDH1 is predominately expressed in the spleen, retina, and peripheral blood leukocytes. IMPDH1 is generally expressed constitutively at low levels, and IMPDH2 is generally upregulated in proliferating cells and neoplastic tissues. Homozygous IMPDH1 knockout mice demonstrate a mild retinopathy in which a slow, progressive form of retinal degeneration gradually weakens visual transduction, while homozygous IMPDH2 knockout mice display embryonic lethality.

== Clinical significance ==
Guanine nucleotide synthesis is essential for maintaining normal cell function and growth, and is also important for the maintenance of cell proliferation and immune responses. IMPDH expression is found to be upregulated in some tumor tissues and cell lines. B and T lymphocytes display a dependence on IMPDH for normal activation and function, and demonstrate upregulated IMPDH expression. Therefore, IMPDH has been addressed as a drug target for immunosuppressive and cancer chemotherapy.

Mycophenolate is an immunosuppressant that is used to prevent transplant rejection and acts through inhibition of IMPDH. Mycophenolate mofetil has been shown to inhibit completely both vaccinia and monkeypox viruses.

Mutations in the Bateman domain of IMPDH1 are associated with the RP10 form of autosomal dominant retinitis pigmentosa and dominant Leber's congenital amaurosis.

== Research ==
IMPDH inhibitors have been shown to prevent SARS-CoV-2 replication in cells and are being tested in clinical trials for COVID-19.

Recently, several IMPDH inhibitors, including AVN-944, have been identified as promising compounds against Trypanosoma cruzi, the etiological agent of Chagas disease.

== See also ==
- Purine metabolism
- Xanthosine
