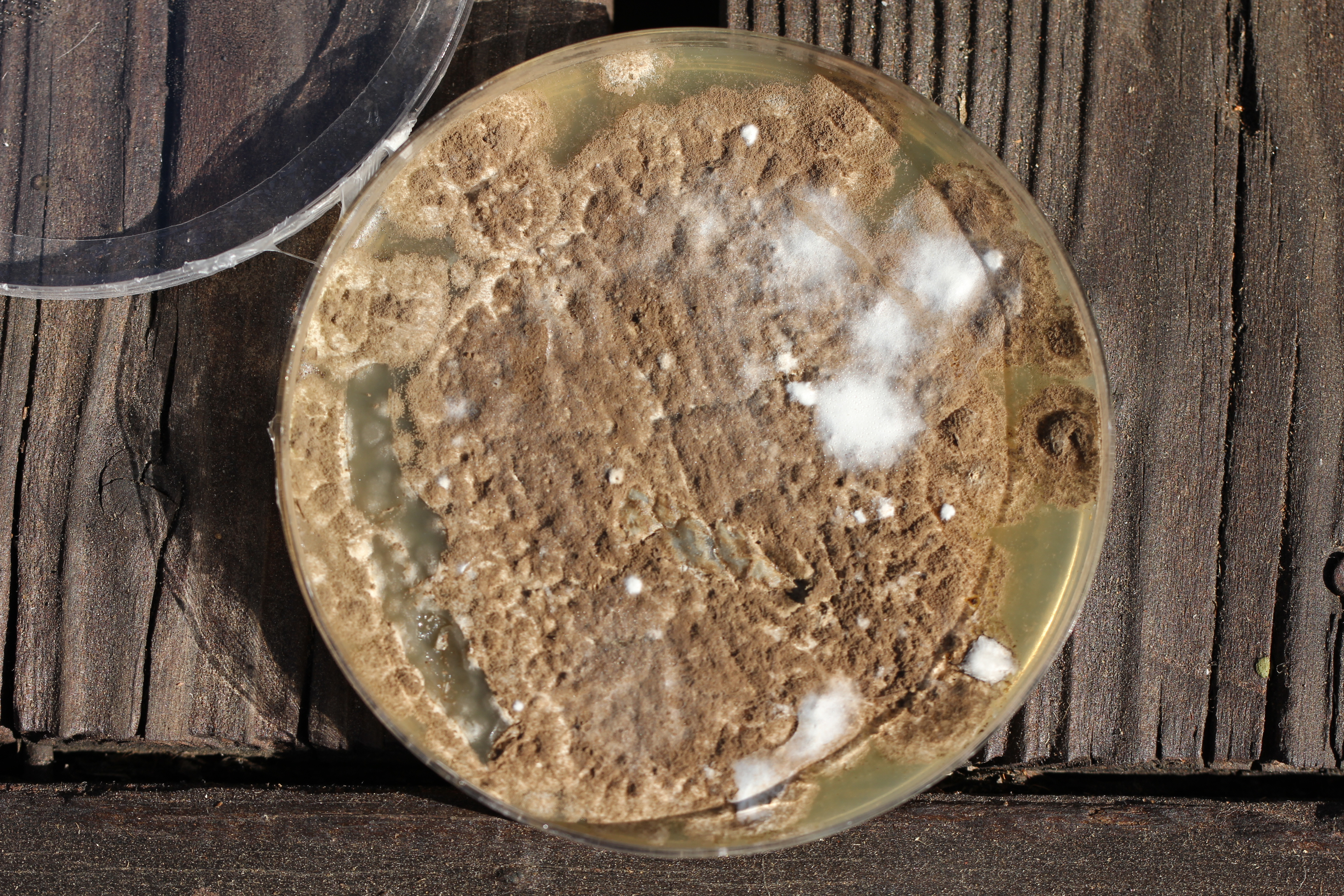

Scientific classification
- Domain: Eukaryota
- Kingdom: Fungi
- Division: Ascomycota
- Class: Eurotiomycetes
- Order: Eurotiales
- Family: Aspergillaceae
- Genus: Penicillium
- Species: P. brevicompactum

Binomial name
- Penicillium brevicompactum Dierckx, 1901

Synonyms
- Penicillium griseobrunneum Dierckx (1901); Penicillium stoloniferum Thom (1910); Penicillium tabescens Westling (1911); Penicillium monstrosum Sopp (1912); Penicillium bialowiezense K.M. Zalessky (1927); Penicillium biourgeianum K.M. Zalessky (1927); Penicillium hagemi K.M. Zalessky (1927); Penicillium patris-mei K.M. Zalessky (1927); Penicillium szaferi K.M. Zalessky (1927); Penicillium volgaense Beliakova & Milko (1972)

= Penicillium brevicompactum =

Species of fungus

Penicillium brevicompactum is a mould species in the genus Penicillium.

Mycophenolic acid can be isolated from P. brevicompactum.
