= Fava (surname) =

Fava is a surname. Notable people with the surname include:

- Amand-Joseph Fava (1826–1899), French bishop
- Anna Mainardi Fava (1933–2003), Italian politician
- Antonio Fava (born 1949), Italian actor and comedian
- Antonio Hercolani Fava Simonetti (1883–1962), Italian noble and diplomat
- Athos Fava (1925–2016), Argentine politician
- Carlo Del Fava (born 1981), Italian rugby player
- Claudio Fava (born 1957), Italian politician and writer
- Dino Fava (born 1977), Italian football player
- Enrique Fava (1920–1994), Argentine actor
- Franco Fava (born 1952), Italian athlete
- Giovanni Fava (psychiatrist) (born 1952), Italian psychiatrist and academic
- Giuseppe Fava (1925–1984), Italian writer and journalist
- Kate Del Fava (born 1998), American football player
- Maximo Fava (1911–date of death unknown), Brazilian rower
- Michael Fava (born 1962), British Catholic priest and former military officer
- Pietro Ercole Fava (1669–1744), Italian nobleman
- Ronald Fava (born 1949), American politician
- Saverio Fava (1832–1913), Italian diplomat and politician
- Scott Fava (born 1976), Australian rugby player
