= Antea =

Antea may refer to:

- Antea (Parmigianino), a painting by the Italian painter Parmigianino
- Antea Cement, an Albanian company
- Antea LifeStyle Center in Querétaro, Mexico, the largest shopping center in Mexico
- Antea, a queen in Greek mythology
- Antaea, an epithet for a number of mythological goddesses

== See also ==
- Antes (name)
