= Antos (name) =

Antoś is a Polish masculine given name that is a diminutive form of Antoni, Antonin and Antonius that is used in Poland. Antoś, Antos or Antoš may either be a surname or given name. As a surname it is derived from the Antonius root name. Notable people with these names include:

== Given name ==
- Antoš Frolka (1877–1935), Czech painter
- Antos Gémes, (born 1981), Hungarian actor

== Surname ==
- István Antos (1908–1960), Hungarian politician
- Mihály Antos (1879–1937), Hungarian gymnast.
- Václav Antoš (1905–1978), Czech swimmer

== Fictional characters ==
- Bareil Antos, Star Trek: Deep Space Nine character

== See also ==
- Antes (name)
- Anto (name)
- Anton (given name)
- Anton (surname)
- Ants (given name) (not a cognate)
- Aetos (disambiguation)
- Altos (disambiguation)
- Antes (disambiguation)
- Anthos (disambiguation)
- Antis (disambiguation)
- Atos (disambiguation)
