= Antas =

Antas may refer to:

== People ==
- Jolanta Antas (born 1954), Polish professor of linguistics

== Places ==
- Antas, Andalusia, Spain
- Antas, Bahia, Brazil
- Antăș, Bobâlna, Romania
- Antas de Ulla, Galicia, Spain

== Other ==
- Temple of Antas, Italy

== See also ==
- Antes (name)
