= Orphic Hymns =

Collection of 87 ancient Greek hymns

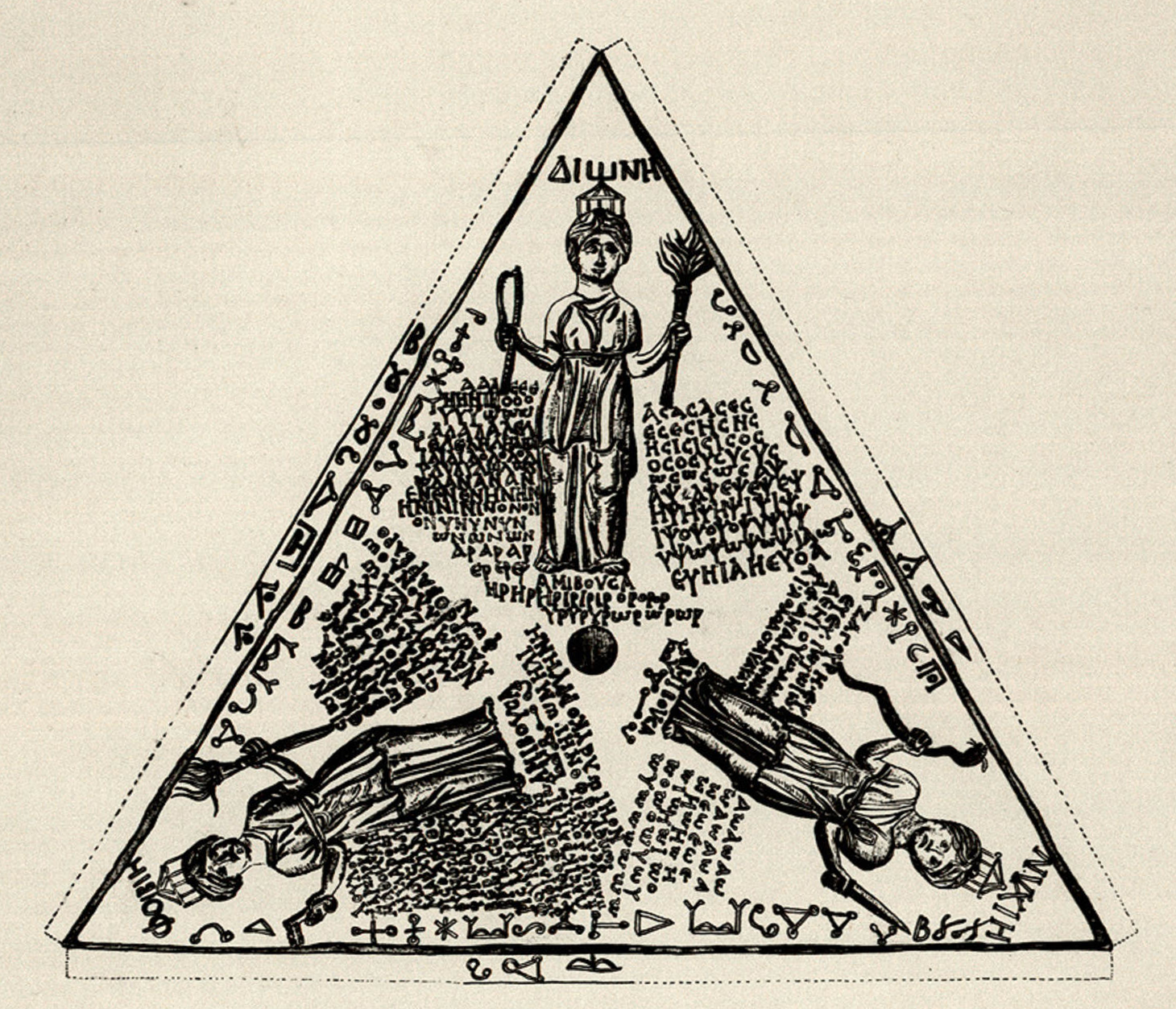
Illustration of a bronze tablet from Pergamon, Asia Minor, dating to the 3rd century AD. An inscription mentions the goddess Melinoë, who is otherwise known only from the Orphic Hymns.

The Orphic Hymns are a collection of eighty-seven ancient Greek hymns addressed to various deities, which were attributed in antiquity to the mythical poet Orpheus. They were composed in Asia Minor (located in modern-day Turkey), most likely around the 2nd or 3rd centuries AD, and were used in the rites of a religious community which existed in the region. The Hymns are among the few extant works of Orphic literature (the tradition of texts attributed to Orpheus in antiquity), and recent scholars have observed parallels between the collection and other Orphic works.

The collection is preceded by a proem (or prologue), in which Orpheus addresses the legendary poet Musaeus, and calls upon around seventy deities to be present. The individual hymns in the collection, all of which are brief, typically call for the attention of the deity they address, before describing them and highlighting aspects of their divinity, and then appealing to them with a request. The descriptions of deities consist primarily of strings of epithets (titles or adjectives applied to gods), which make up a substantial portion of the hymns' content, and are designed to summon the powers of the god. The deity featured most prominently in the collection is Dionysus, who is the recipient of eight hymns, and is mentioned throughout the collection under various names. Most of the deities featured in the Hymns are derived from mainstream Greek mythology, and a number are assimilated with one another.

The Orphic Hymns seem to have belonged to a cult community from Asia Minor which used the collection in ritual, and probably held Dionysus as their central god. The rite in which the Orphic Hymns featured was the teletḗ (τελετή, a term which usually refers to a rite of initiation into mysteries), and this ceremony appears to have taken place at night-time. Most hymns specify an offering to be made to the deity, which was probably burned during the performance of the hymn. Scholars have noted the apparent lack of Orphic doctrines in the Hymns, though certain themes and references have been interpreted as pointing to the presence of Orphic thought in the collection.

No external references to the Orphic Hymns survive from antiquity, and they are first mentioned by the Byzantine writer John Diaconus Galenus (who has been dated to the 12th century AD). From perhaps as early as the 5th century AD, the Orphic Hymns were preserved in a codex which also included works such as the Orphic Argonautica and the Homeric Hymns. The first codex containing the Orphic Hymns to reach Western Europe arrived in Italy in the first half of the 15th century, and in 1500 the first printed edition of the Hymns was published in Florence. During the Renaissance, a number of scholars believed that the collection was a genuine work of Orpheus, while in the late 18th century a more sceptical wave of scholarship argued for a dating in late antiquity. In the late 19th and early 20th centuries, a number of inscriptions were discovered in Asia Minor, leading to the ritual function of the collection being established among classicists and historians of religion.

== Composition and attribution ==
=== Provenance and date ===
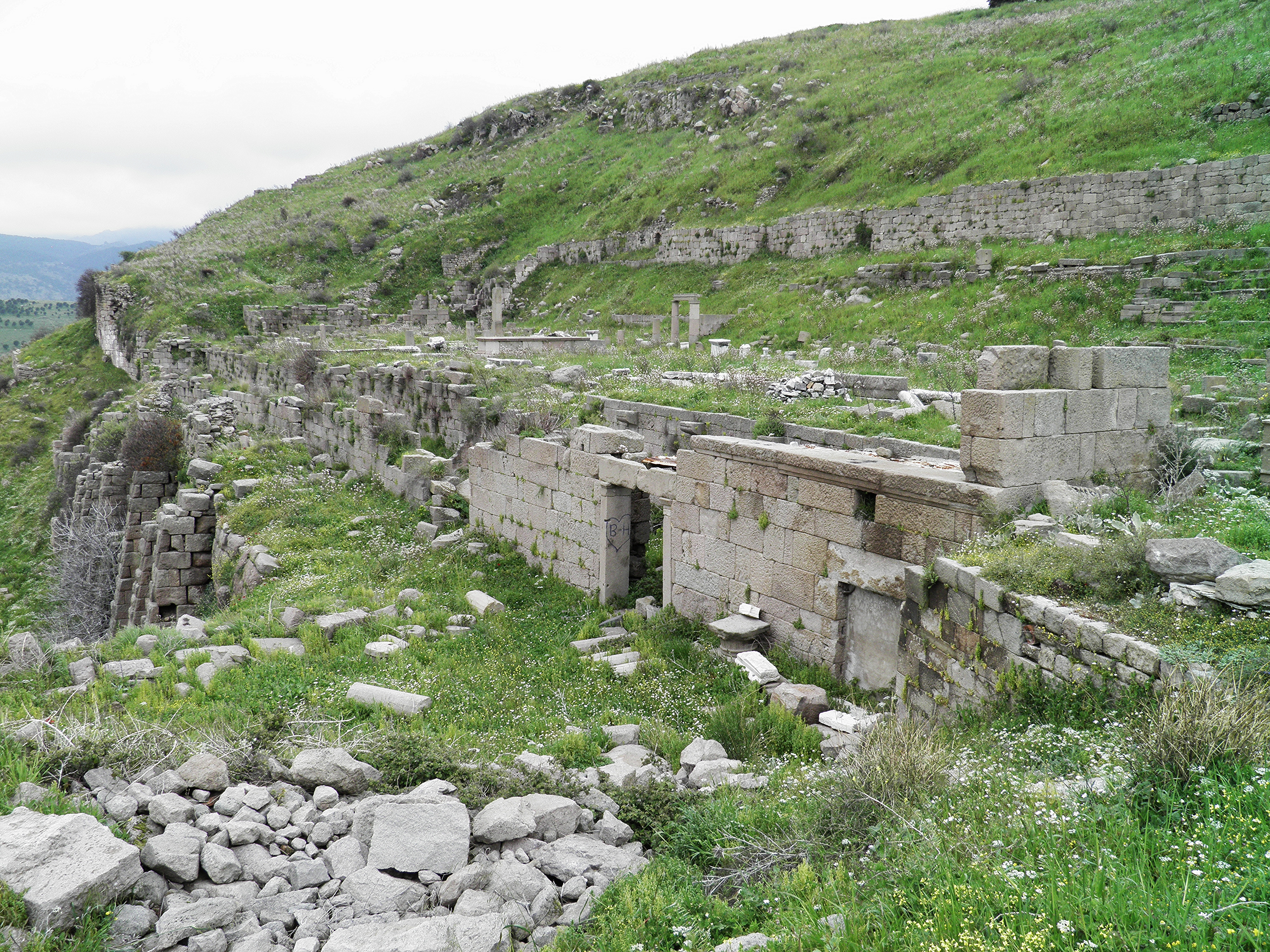
The sanctuary of Demeter from the city of Pergamon in Asia Minor, where inscriptions to deities addressed in the Orphic Hymns were discovered

It is widely accepted in modern scholarship that the Orphic Hymns were composed in Asia Minor (located in modern-day Turkey). (Note: Herrero de Jáuregui 2010a, p. 47; Morand 2001, p. 196. The view that the Hymns originated in Egypt, held by some as recently as the early 20th century, has been firmly rejected by more recent scholars.) The most significant piece of evidence linking the collection to this region is the inclusion of deities – such as Mise, Hipta, and Melinoë – who are attested only in western Asia Minor, and whose presence in inscriptions from the area indicate they were the subject of worship there. The prominence given in the collection to deities associated with the sea, as well as the concern displayed towards the sea and its perils, indicate that the Hymns were probably composed somewhere near the coast of Asia Minor.

In 1911, Otto Kern postulated that the Hymns originated from the city of Pergamon (near the western coast of Asia Minor), on the basis of a number of inscriptions, dedicated to deities addressed in the Hymns, which had been discovered in the sanctuary of Demeter in the city. Evaluating Kern's hypothesis in her 2001 study of the Hymns, Anne-France Morand concludes that, although an origin in Pergamon cannot be ruled out, the city cannot be definitively identified as the collection's place of provenance, given that the epigraphic evidence connected with the Hymns originates from throughout western Asia Minor. There is near-universal agreement in modern scholarship that the Orphic Hymns were composed for use by a religious community, which existed in the region and used the collection in ritual. (Note: Malamis, p. 197; Ricciardelli 2000, p. xxxiv. On the group which used the Hymns, as well the rite in which they played a role, see § Religious significance.) Kern argued that this group existed in Pergamon at the sanctuary of Demeter, a view which Morand dismisses, as the site of the cult's activity was more likely private (and sanctuaries were generally public). (Note: Morand 2001, p. 303. On the public nature of ancient Greek sanctuaries, see Miles, para. 3.)

Estimates for the date of the Orphic Hymns' composition have varied widely, (Note: Morand 2001, p. 35. For an overview of the datings which were put forward from the 18th century through to the mid-20th century, see Hunsucker, pp. 20–22.) though most have fallen between the 2nd century BC and the 5th century AD. Among recent scholars, the collection has typically been dated to around the 2nd or 3rd centuries AD. Studies of the collection's vocabulary suggest a date around the 3rd to 5th centuries AD, and attempts to date the Hymns based upon the perceived influence of certain forms of philosophical thought have been largely inconclusive. No references to the Orphic Hymns survive from antiquity, though modern scholars have largely avoided arguing for a date on this basis.

Gabriella Ricciardelli, who supports a date in the 2nd or 3rd century AD, points to the prominence of the worship of Dionysus (who occupies a central role in the collection) in Asia Minor around this time. Morand places the Hymns between the 2nd and 5th centuries AD, though this dating has been criticised for placing undue weight upon the similarity of the collection's vocabulary with that of the 5th-century AD poet Nonnus. In Radcliffe Edmonds's estimation, the collection contains passages taken from earlier works, and may have been a "synthesis of earlier and contemporary works, organized by an Orphicist of the time". Daniel Malamis, who argues that a date in the 1st century AD (or even the 1st century BC) should not be ruled out, suggests that the work may have been composed as an analogue to the Orphic Rhapsodies, (Note: Malamis, pp. 450–451. Malamis suggests that the collection may have, alongside the Rhapsodies, been a "similarly compendious work, but one that synthesises earlier poetry in the hymnic, ritual format, as opposed to the narrative format of myth".) a theogony attributed to Orpheus, typically dated to between the 1st century BC and the 2nd century AD.

The identity of the poet who produced the collection is unknown, though most scholars agree that the Hymns were the product of a single author. (Note: Malamis, p. 196. For example, see Graf 1992, p. 161; West 1983, p. 28. The majority of recent scholars, however, view the proem as having originally been separate; see § Structure and style.) On the basis of stylistic differences from the rest of the collection, some scholars have argued that certain hymns may have been added to the collection at a later date; Ricciardelli points to the hymn to the Moirai (Hymn 59), as well as those to Hermes Chthonius (Hymn 57), Mother Antaia (Hymn 41), and Aphrodite (Hymn 55), as examples of such hymns. (Note: Ricciardelli 2008, p. 345. In the hymn to the Moirai, the characteristic strings of epithets, which typically constitute much of the hymn's content, make up only four of the twenty verses, and Ricciardelli describes the hymn as being "inspired" in tone.) Certain passages from other hymns are potentially interpolations, including two lines from the hymn to Nyx (Hymn 3), which may have been taken from an earlier Orphic hymn to the goddess.

=== Attribution to Orpheus ===
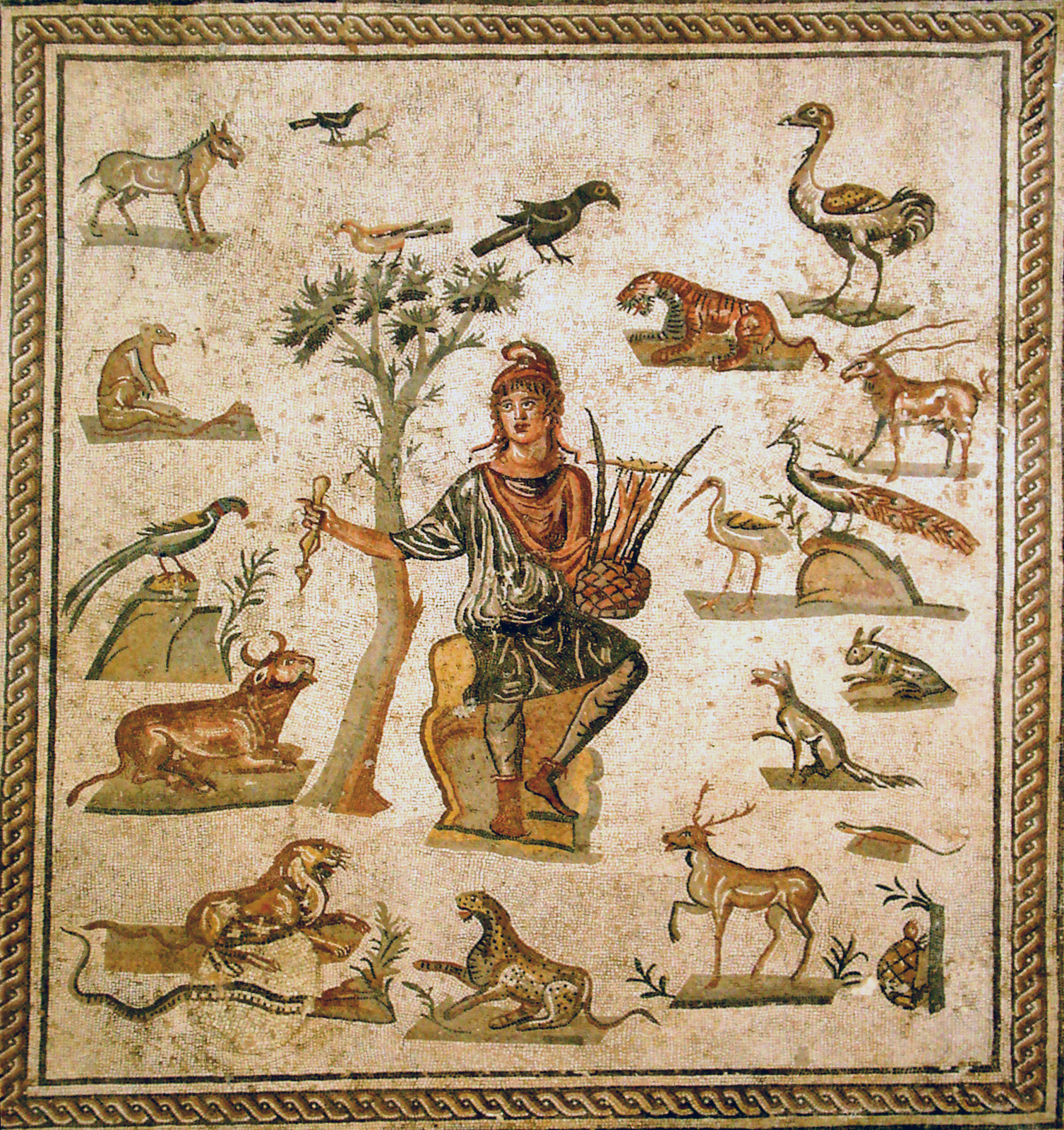
Roman mosaic of Orpheus, the mythical poet to whom the Orphic Hymns were attributed, from Palermo, 2nd century AD

The collection's attribution to the mythical poet Orpheus is found in the title (which varies across the surviving manuscripts). (Note: Herrero de Jáuregui 2015, p. 230. On the variance of the title across the collection's manuscripts, see Malamis, p. 205; according to Malamis, the "common element" among the preserved titles is [Orphéōs / Orpheùs] pròs Mousaîon ([Ὀρφέως / Ὀρφεὺς] πρὸς Μουσαῖον).) This title sits above the proem, (Note: Ricciardelli 2008, p. 328. On the proem and its place in the collection, see § Structure and style.) an address to the legendary poet Musaeus of Athens (a kind of address found in other works), which marks the collection as a work of Orpheus. In antiquity, literary works were attributed to Orpheus as a way of attaching to them a special kind of authority, marking them as innovative, or deviant from the standard tradition. For the Hymns, their ascription to Orpheus would have placed them even earlier than Homer, whom Orpheus was believed to have preceded. The collection is written in the first-person voice of Orpheus, with the proem itself being the address he gives to Musaeus. In the rest of the collection, there are several passages which indicate the work was written as though composed by Orpheus: Orphic Hymn 76 to the Muses mentions "mother Calliope", (Note: Morand 2015, p. 212; OH 76.10 (Athanassakis & Wolkow, p. 60; Quandt, p. 52).) and Orphic Hymn 24 to the Nereids refers to "mother Calliope and lord Apollo", alluding to the parentage of Orpheus (whose mother was said to be Calliope, and his father, at times, Apollo). (Note: Herrero de Jáuregui 2015, p. 231; Morand 2015, p. 212; OH 24.12 (Athanassakis & Wolkow, p. 23; Quandt, p. 21).)

The Orphic Hymns are among the few extant works of Orphic literature, the tradition of texts attributed to Orpheus in antiquity which dealt with certain themes and myths distinct from those in mainstream Greek literature. A number of scholars have brought into question how "Orphic" the Hymns can be considered, partly because of the apparent absence of references to known Orphic myths, with Henri-Dominique Saffrey in 1994 characterising them as "Orphic only in name". (Note: Rudhardt 2008, Introduction, para. 6, quoting Saffrey, p. 6.) More recently, Morand and Jean Rudhardt have seen the Hymns as markedly Orphic in nature, displaying characteristics typical of Orphic texts and borrowing from the Orphic literary tradition. (Note: Morand 2001, p. 197; Rudhardt 2008, Introduction, paras. 6–7; Rudhardt 1991, p. 282. For places in which the Hymns draw from the Orphic literary tradition, see Rudhardt 2008, Chapter II, paras. 19, 36, 67, 137, 141, 155, 177.) The Hymns contain numerous poetic formulae (recurring phrases used to express common ideas) which are known to have been present in the Orphic Rhapsodies, and the order of the hymns in much of the collection appears to reflect that theogony's narrative (though it is unclear whether these features were derived from the Rhapsodies themselves, or from earlier Orphic poems upon which the theogony drew). (Note: Malamis, pp. 388–389. For Malamis's discussion of the apparent parallels between the sequence of the hymns and the narrative of the Rhapsodies, see Malamis, pp. 208–212.) Marie-Christine Fayant sees allusions in the collection to myths which appeared in Orphic theogonies, such as the dismemberment of Dionysus and Zeus's swallowing of the hermaphroditic deity Protogonos. She also argues that in the Hymns' content one can observe a cosmogony similar to that in the Hieronyman Theogony, a lost Orphic theogony possibly dating to the 2nd century BC, with which she believes the author of the Hymns was probably familiar. (Note: Fayant 2014, pp. 697–700. For Fayant's reconstruction of the cosmogony which she reads within the Hymns, see Fayant 2014, pp. 690–696. On the Hieronyman Theogony, and for this dating, see Meisner 2018, p. 1.)

The Orphic Hymns are the most important surviving representative of the genre of hymnic literature attributed to Orpheus. Examples of hymns ascribed to Orpheus are attested at least as early as the 5th century BC, (Note: Morand 2001, p. 89. For a discussion of Orphic hymns other than the collection of eighty-seven hymns, see Bernabé 2008, pp. 413–417.) and the limited surviving evidence for this genre points to such works having been short hymns which contained strings of epithets, and were created for ritual use (or were ritualistic in their manner of address). (Note: Malamis, p. 436; Herrero de Jáuregui 2010b, p. 90. The line quoted here is from Malamis.) In Malamis's view, the author of the collection of eighty-seven hymns was probably familiar with earlier Orphic hymns, and chose to produce a work which was similar in content and style.

== Structure and style ==
Learn now, Mousaios, a mystical and most holy rite,
a prayer which surely excels all others.

Μάνθανε δή, Μουσαῖε, θυηπολίην περισέμνην,
εὐχήν, ἢ δή τοι προφερεστέρη ἐστὶν ἁπασέων.

— Proem, lines 1–2, translated by Apostolos Athanassakis and Benjamin Wolkow

The collection begins with a text, often referred to as the proem or prologue, (Note: For the former, see Morand 2015, p. 209; Herrero de Jáuregui 2015, p. 224. For the latter, see Morand 2001, p. 36.) in which Orpheus addresses Musaeus, who is often described as his student or son in Greek literature. (Note: West 1968, p. 288; Herrero de Jáuregui 2015, p. 232. According to Herrero de Jáuregui, this kind of address, from the teacher figure to the student, is a "typical feature of didactic poetry", and Orpheus can here be seen as the "prototype of the poet and the priest who would compose and sing hymns", while Musaeus can be seen as the "prototype of the initiates who would listen to them".) The proem has fifty-four lines, including the final ten which make up the hymn to Hecate (which is attached without separation or a title). The opening two lines of the proem are a dedication in which Orpheus asks Musaeus to learn the rite (thuēpolíē, θυηπολίη) and prayer (eukhḗ, εὐχή). The latter refers to the address which follows on lines three to forty-four, in which around seventy different deities are called upon to attend the rite, as well as the libation (spondḗ, σπονδή) (referring to the ceremony in which the Hymns would have played a role). The purpose of this prayer is seemingly to name and devote a hymn to all the gods, although it addresses numerous deities not mentioned in the collection itself, and omits others who are subjects of hymns. Partly on the basis of this difference in the deities mentioned, as well as the presence of the word thuēpolíē (which does not appear in the rest of the collection) (Note: Morand 2015, p. 210 translates this term as "a ritual usually linked with sacrifice".) at the beginning and end of the proem, Martin Litchfield West posits that the proem was originally a separate Orphic poem. (Note: West 1968, pp. 288–289. West argues that this poem was called Thuēpolikón (Θυηπολικόν), which is a title listed by the 10th-century AD Suda among the works it attributes to Orpheus. West argues that "[t]he title would naturally be derived from the references to a θυηπολίη at the beginning and end of the poem".) The idea that the proem and the rest of the collection were of distinct origins has been the more commonly held view among scholars, (Note: Malamis, p. 203. For example, see Gordon, p. 35; Fayant 2014, p. lxxxix; Ricciardelli 2008, p. 330.) though Morand has recently argued for their common authorship, pointing to the similarities in the usage of epithets, and in the way deities are characterised between the two.

In addition to the proem, the Orphic Hymns consist of eighty-seven brief poems, which range from six to thirty lines in length. In the surviving manuscripts, the hymn addressed to Hecate is appended to the proem, though modern editions present it separately, as the first hymn of the collection. (Note: Ricciardelli 2000, p. xlii. Ricciardelli argues that the hymn to Hecate was originally separate from both the proem and the rest of collection, and was added at the same time as the proem.) The hymns follow a sequence which moves from birth to death: the second hymn is addressed to Prothyraia, a goddess associated with birth, while the last is dedicated to Thanatos (Death), and ends in the word gêras (γῆρας, 'old age'). The collection is also arranged in such a way that primordial deities appear in the earliest hymns, and later gods are found further on; the first hymns are addressed to deities who feature in Orphic cosmogony, such as Nyx (Hymn 3), Uranus (Hymn 4), Aether (Hymn 5), and Protogonos (Hymn 6). Deities who possess similarities or are associated with one another are often placed in adjacent hymns, such as the astronomical divinities – the Stars, Sun (Helios), and Moon (Selene) (Hymns 7–9) – or Zeus and Hera (Hymns 15–16), who are linked through their marriage. The ordering of hymns also appears to correspond to the narrative of one or more Orphic theogonies, with parallels to the Orphic Rhapsodies in particular. (Note: Malamis, pp. 208–212. According to Graf, the myth of the dismemberment of Dionysus can also be seen in the order of Hymns 29–37.) Fayant sees a chiastic structure in the sequence of the hymns, dividing them into five groups of deities (centred around a Dionysian core): primordial and cosmic gods (Hymns 3–14), divinities presiding over human activities (Hymns 28–43), Dionysus and his retinue (Hymns 44–58), divinities concerned with the lives of humans (Hymns 59–77), and, once again, cosmic gods (Hymns 78–84). (Note: Fayant 2014, p. lxii; Meisner 2014, p. 288. Fayant labels these sections, respectively, as A, B, C, B', and A'. These groupings exclude the very first and last hymns in the collection, which she lists as prologue (Hymns 1–2) and epilogue (Hymns 85–87) sections. For Fayant's full discussion of these groupings, see Fayant 2014, pp. xxxvi–lxiii.) Malamis argues for a tripartite structure in which the sections open with hymns to Hecate, Hermes, and Hermes Chthonius, respectively (Hymns 1, 28, 57), all of whom are associated with boundaries. (Note: Malamis, p. 215. The three groups of deities in these sections are cosmic gods (Hymns 1–27), gods associated with the mysteries (Hymns 28–58), and gods related to the lives of humans.)

Each individual hymn in the collection has three internal parts: the invocation, the development, and the request. (Note: Rudhardt 1991, p. 264; Rudhardt 2008, Chapter I, para. 21. Fayant prefers to see only two parts in each hymn, viewing the development as part of the invocation.) In some hymns, especially those shorter in length, these three parts can be difficult to distinguish, and may not occur in order. (Note: Morand 2001, pp. 41–42. For an outline of the ways in which various hymns deviate from this standard structure, see Rudhardt 2008, Chapter I, paras. 23–24.) The invocation is brief, typically appears at the start of the hymn, and is designed to gain the attention of the hymn's addressee. It names the deity, and usually calls upon them with a verb, which may be in the imperative, though sometimes no such verb is present, in which case the god is simply named. (Note: Morand 2001, p. 45. In several hymns the addressee is not named at all; see Morand 2001, p. 48. For example, Orphic Hymn 69 does not name its recipients, the Erinyes, as saying their name was believed to bring strife upon the person who spoke it.) The development (also referred to as the amplification) makes up the main, central portion of the hymn, and is the longest section; it follows immediately from the invocation, with the point at which it begins often being difficult to distinguish. It consists mostly of descriptions of the deity, particularly in the form of numerous epithets, and may discuss different features or aspects of the god, as well as include information such as their familial relations, or locations in which they were worshipped; (Note: Morand 2001, p. 58. Some hymns also contain an intermediate request, which is located within the development; see Morand 2001, pp. 48–49.) the purpose of this section is to gratify the deity so that they choose to make themselves present. The request (also referred to as the prayer) generally finishes the hymn, and is usually only around one or two lines in length. (Note: Morand 2001, p. 49. The point at which the request begins is almost always easily distinguishable; see Rudhardt 2008, Chapter I, para. 146.) It opens with several verbs which typically ask for the god to listen to what the speaker has to say, and for them to be present. The content of the request varies across the collection: some hymns ask the deity to come favourably, some ask for their presence at the mystery, or to accept a sacrifice; others ask for certain outcomes, such as health, prosperity, or wealth, which in some instances are specific to the god, such as the request for the Clouds to bring rain, or for Hygieia to ward off illnesses.

1 Πρωτόγονον καλέω [...]
[...] διφυῆ, μέγαν, αἰθερόπλαγκτον,
ὠιογενῆ, χρυσέαισιν ἀγαλλόμενον πτερύγεσσι,
ταυροβόαν, γένεσιν μακάρων θνητῶν τ’ ἀνθρώπων,
σπέρμα πολύμνηστον, πολυόργιον, Ἠρικεπαῖον,
5 ἄρρητον, κρύφιον ῥοιζήτορα, παμφαὲς ἔρνος,
ὄσσων ὃς σκοτόεσσαν ἀπημαύρωσας ὁμίχλην
πάντη δινηθεὶς πτερύγων ῥιπαῖς κατὰ κόσμον
λαμπρὸν ἄγων φάος ἁγνόν, ἀφ’οὗ σε Φάνητα κικλήσκω
ἠδὲ Πρίηπον ἄνακτα καὶ Ἀνταύγην ἑλίκωπον.
10 ἀλλά, μάκαρ, πολύμητι, πολύσπορε, βαῖνε γεγηθὼς
ἐς τελετὴν ἁγίαν πολυποίκιλος ὀργιοφάντης.
Protogonos I call, [...] ] – Invocation
[...] twin-sexed, great, roaming the ether, ⌉ – Development
egg-born, rejoicing in golden wings,
bullroarer, birth of the blessed and of mortals,
seed much-minded, of many rites, Erikepaios,
unspoken, hidden rusher, all-radiant shoot;
who undimmed the dark mist from the eyes,
whirling in beating of wings through the cosmos
bringing light, bright, pure: whence I call you Phanes
and Priapos the king, and quick-glancing Antauges.
But blessed, much-minded, much-seeded, come joyful ⌉ – Request
to the holy rite, our all-varied hierophant.
The text of Hymn 6 to Protogonos, with Daniel Malamis's translation. The three parts of the hymn are marked. (Note: Malamis, pp. 30–33. The division of the three parts of the hymn is based upon Malamis, pp. 464–465, 474.)

For the most part, the hymns in the collection are unified in their style and language. (Note: Gordon, p. 35; Ricciardelli 2008, p. 345; Rudhardt 2008, Introduction, para. 25; cf. Graf 1992, p. 161. Some scholars view certain hymns, which appear to be stylistically dissimilar to the others in the collection, as later additions; see § Provenance and date.) They are written in dactylic hexameter, the metre of Homeric poetry, (Note: Athanassakis & Wolkow, p. 175. On dactylic hexameter as the metre of Homeric poetry, and its use in works attributed to Orpheus, see Edmonds 2013a, pp. 4, 74.) and display a consistency in metrical composition. According to Rudhardt, in terms of vocabulary and grammar, the Hymns find a "distant model" in the works of Hesiod and Homer, but also contain words and forms from later literature, spanning from the 5th century BC to the first centuries AD. (Note: Rudhardt 2008, Introduction, para. 18–9, 22; see also Hopman-Govers, p. 37.) In particular, the language of the collection bears similarity to that of late works such as Nonnus's Dionysiaca, the Greek Magical Papyri, and several poems from the Greek Anthology. The most distinctive feature of the Hymns is their use of concatenations of epithets, which constitute a large part of their content. (Note: Hopman-Govers, p. 44. On the role of epithets in the Hymns, see § Deities in the Hymns below.) They also make extensive use of phonic repetition, as well as forms of wordplay, such as etymologies of the names of gods. Other notable stylistic elements include the frequent use of compound adjectives as epithets, the tendency to juxtapose contrasting descriptions of deities, and the use of asyndeton (the omission of conjunctions).

== Religious significance ==
It is largely accepted in modern scholarship that the Orphic Hymns were religious in function, and were used in rites by a cult which existed in Asia Minor. (Note: Malamis, p. 197; Ricciardelli 2000, p. xxxiv; Graf & Johnston, p. 155; Graf 2009, p. 170; Linforth, p. 186. For a discussion of where this group existed, and when the Hymns were composed, see § Provenance and date above.) According to Morand, this group performed initiations into some form of mysteries. (Note: Morand 2001, p. 238; cf. Graf & Johnston, p. 141, who describes the group as a "mystery association".) The term boukólos (βουκόλος, 'cowherd') is found in the Hymns, a religious title which is often used elsewhere to refer to worshippers of Dionysus, and is connected to Orpheus in some contexts. (Note: Morand 2001, p. 286. The term appears twice, in OH 1 to Hecate, and OH 31 to the Kouretes. For an extensive discussion of the term boukólos, see Morand 2001, pp. 249–282.) The use of the word boukólos and the prominence of Dionysus in the collection indicate that he was the central god of the cult which used the Hymns, and some scholars describe the group as Dionysian or Bacchic. (Note: Graf & Johnston, p. 155; Bremmer, p. 106; Morand, apud Malamis, p. 189; Ricciardelli 2008, p. 325. According to Morand 2001, pp. 232–235, the group may have been called a thiasus.) Within the collection itself, Morand sees different members of the group's religious hierarchy as being mentioned: the mústai (μύσται), the regular members of the cult (and the group mentioned most frequently); the neomústai (νεομύσται), the "new initiates"; the mustipóloi (μυστιπόλοι), who were probably members involved in initiations and ritual activity; (Note: Morand 2001, pp. 240–242. The term means "clothed with mystical power", or "with the power of mysteries".) and the orgiophántai (ὀργιοφάνται), who seem to have been members involved in initiation rites (similarly to the mustipóloi), and who may also have been responsible for displaying holy objects. Richard Martin criticises Morand's reading of a religious hierarchy in these terms, characterising it as "treating hymnic vocabulary as hard evidence".

Most of the hymns in the collection contain a specification of an offering to be made to the deity, which is given as part of the title of the hymn; (Note: Morand 2001, pp. 101, 103; Ricciardelli 2000, p. xxxvii; Ricciardelli 2008, p. 335. Titles which include offerings contain the name of the deity, after which comes the word thumiama (θυμίαμα), and then a specification of the offering..) only eight hymns lack such an offering in the title. (Note: Morand 2001, p. 103. For a discussion of these eight hymns, and the possible reasoning for them not having an offering, see Morand 2001, pp. 111–115.) During the reciting of a hymn, its specified offering would probably have been burned. (Note: Morand 2001, pp. 150–151; Edmonds 2019, p. 164. Morand states that grain, the offering to Earth, might be the possible exception to this.) The offerings most commonly specified are spices, frankincense, storax, manna, and myrrh; (Note: Malamis, p. 206. For a discussion of these substances, see Morand 2001, pp. 118–126.) in some cases a combination of offerings is asked for. Several hymns specify a unique offering to be given to the deity, such as torches to Nyx, saffron to Aether, poppies to Hypnos, and grain (excluding beans or herbs) to Earth; Orphic Hymn 53 to Amphietes asks for a libation of milk in addition to an offering. (Note: Morand 2001, p. 324. For an extensive discussion of these offerings, see Morand 2001, pp. 126–137.) While in a few cases there is a recognisable link between a deity and their offering, as with torches for Nyx (the goddess of the night) or grain for Earth, for most of the hymns there is no clear reasoning behind the choice of offering. Deities which are associated with each other, however, will sometimes be given the same offering. The absence of animals from the offerings may be related to the supposed prohibition of animal sacrifice in Orphic belief.

The ceremony in which the Hymns played a role was the teletḗ (τελετή), a term which usually refers to a rite of initiation into mysteries. (Note: Morand 2001, p. 140. On this term, see Versnel, p. 1480.) Within the Hymns, there are numerous references to the teletḗ, including several mentions of the pántheios teletḗ (πάνθειος τελετή), an initiation rite to all the gods. (Note: Morand 2001, p. 141. Hunsucker, p. 36 suggests that the multitude of deities featured in the collection may indicate that it played a role in a pántheios teletḗ.) This rite appears to have occurred at night-time, and may have included the playing of a tambourine at points. The Hymns also contain several instances of the term órgion (ὄργιον), which may refer to sacred objects which featured in the rite. According to Fritz Graf, the placement of the hymn to Hecate (Hymn 1) at the beginning of the collection may reflect the placement of a hekataion (a representation of a triple-shaped Hecate) at the entrance of the building in which the rite took place, which participants would have walked past before it began. In addition, he argues that the presence of the hymn to Nyx (Hymn 3) early in the collection indicates that the Hymns accompanied a nocturnal ritual which began at dusk and lasted through the night. Graf also sees the request to be "good to meet", made of several deities in the collection, as a reflection of the terror which initiates would have felt during the rite at the prospect of encountering a deity who was hostile, as such an experience was supposedly capable of driving one to madness. (Note: Graf 2009, pp. 175–176, 182; Graf & Johnston, p. 156; Malamis, p. 191. The term euántētos (εὐάντητος) is an epithet which means "good to meet". According to Graf 2009, p. 176, it "characterizes powers that are highly ambivalent and not very welcoming, or (more rarely) that protect from more terrible powers". The term appears in five hymns, usually in the final request.) The words of the hymns may have been set to a melody and were perhaps performed with musical accompaniment, although no such music survives.

[...] offshoot of Gaia and starry Ouranos, [...]

Γαίης τε βλάστημα καὶ Οὐρανοῦ ἀστερόεντος

— Hymn 19 to Cronus, line 6, translated by Daniel Malamis. This expression is also found in the "Orphic" gold tablets.

Scholars have noted in the Orphic Hymns the apparent dearth of Orphic doctrines, (Note: Ricciardelli 2008, p. 346; similarly, see also Rudhardt 2008, Introduction, para. 6; Morand 2001, p. 209.) certain religious ideas believed to have been present in now-lost Orphic poems. As a whole, the collection shows little concern for the afterlife, and at no point references the idea of metempsychosis (the transmigration of the soul), which is often associated with Orphism; according to Paul Veyne, the Hymns are essentially uninterested in what happens after death, being concerned only with "this world". (Note: Veyne, pp. 12–13; cf. Vian 2014, p. 137.) In her study of the Hymns, Morand analyses the references to souls, and the roles played by memory and purity, as well as the parallels between the Hymns and similar evidence such as gold tablets which have been considered "Orphic". After reviewing this evidence, she concludes that it is "compatible with Orphism". (Note: Morand 2001, pp. 209–230. In her discussion of the afterlife in the Hymns, she also considers the role of the underworld and underworld deities in the collection, and how concepts such as death, fate, and salvation are treated. In addition, she posits that the lack of interest in the afterlife might be because of the collection's audience and genre, or religious reasons, pointing to mysteries having often kept cult secrets.) Throughout the collection, there is no explicit mention of any major Orphic myth, including the story of the dismemberment of Dionysus by the Titans, which has often been considered the central myth of Orphism; one element of the myth, however, the so-called "Orphic anthropogony", may be alluded to in the hymn to the Titans, which calls its addressees the "ancestors of our fathers". (Note: Morand 2001, pp. 216–217; Ricciardelli 2000, pp. 381–383; OH 37.1–2 (Athanassakis & Wolkow, p. 33; Quandt, p. 29).) The Hymns also make no concrete prescriptions as to a certain way of life, though the absence of meat in the offerings could imply a prohibition of animal sacrifice, and the explicit disallowing of beans in the offering to Gaia may similarly indicate a ban on eating beans, both of which could suggest an Orphic way of life. In addition, the idea of purity holds significance in the Hymns, with the hymn to Eros asking the god to come to the initiates and "banish from them vile impulses", (Note: Graf 2009, pp. 181–182; OH 58.9–10 (Athanassakis & Wolkow, p. 48; Quandt, p. 42). See also OH 61.11–2 (Athanassakis & Wolkow, p. 50; Quandt, p. 44), which asks Nemesis to "grant nobility of mind", and "put an end to repulsive thoughts, thoughts unholy, fickle and haughty".) which potentially indicates adherence to some form of sexual ethics. (Note: Graf 2009, p. 181 n. 58; Morand 2001, pp. 218–219. The phrase quoted here is from Graf.)

== Deities in the Hymns ==
[...] the dreadful winged weapon, heart-quaking, hair-raising,
sudden, thunderous, pure, invincible bolt,
all-devouring onrush in eddies of infinite roaring,
unbreakable, sullen, unfaceable hurricane,
sharp, celestial bolt of the blazing Descender, [...]

πτηνὸν ὅπλον δεινόν, κλονοκάρδιον, ὀρθοέθειρον,
αἰφνίδιον, βρονταῖον, ἀνίκητον βέλος ἁγνόν,
ῥοίζου ἀπειρεσίου δινεύμασι παμφάγον ὁρμήν,
ἄρρηκτον, βαρύθυμον, ἀμαιμάκετον πρηστῆρα,
οὐράνιον βέλος ὀξὺ καταιβάτου αἰθαλόεντος,

— Hymn 19 to Zeus Keraunios, lines 8–12, translated by Daniel Malamis

One of the most distinctive characteristics of the Orphic Hymns is the strings of epithets which constitute a substantial portion of their content. In contrast to the Homeric Hymns, in which the middle part of individual hymns often presents a narrative involving the god, in the Orphic Hymns the development section consists mostly of these concatenations of epithets; references to myths are never more than allusions, (Note: Rudhardt 2002, p. 486; Morand 2007, p. 9. Rudhardt adds that such references would have been opaque to any reader without prior knowledge of the myth.) and these strings of epithets are themselves the typical means through which the collection refers to myths. The purpose of these chains of epithets is to acquire the attention of the god and to summon their powers. To this end, and to gain the goodwill of their addressee, a variety of appellations are used, each of which serves to highlight an aspect of the deity, such as elements of their power, locations of worship, or their part in myths. In addition, epithets will frequently be applied to more than one deity, contributing to the tendency of the collection to bring together separate gods. Some of the epithets in the collection are derived from earlier literature, especially the works of Homer and Hesiod, while others are neologisms, some of which, though without prior attestation, are references to the deity's role in an existing myth; (Note: Hopman-Govers, p. 37, citing Guthrie 1930, pp. 216–221.) others still are allusions to known cult titles of the god, which were used in certain geographical locations. According to Rudhardt, while the paratactic clusters of epithets in the Hymns may seem to indicate "rudimentary thought", within them is contained a sort of syntax, where adjacent terms bear relation to each other in subtle ways. (Note: Rudhardt 2008, Chapter I, paras. 229, 285; cf. Rudhardt 1991, pp. 265–268.)

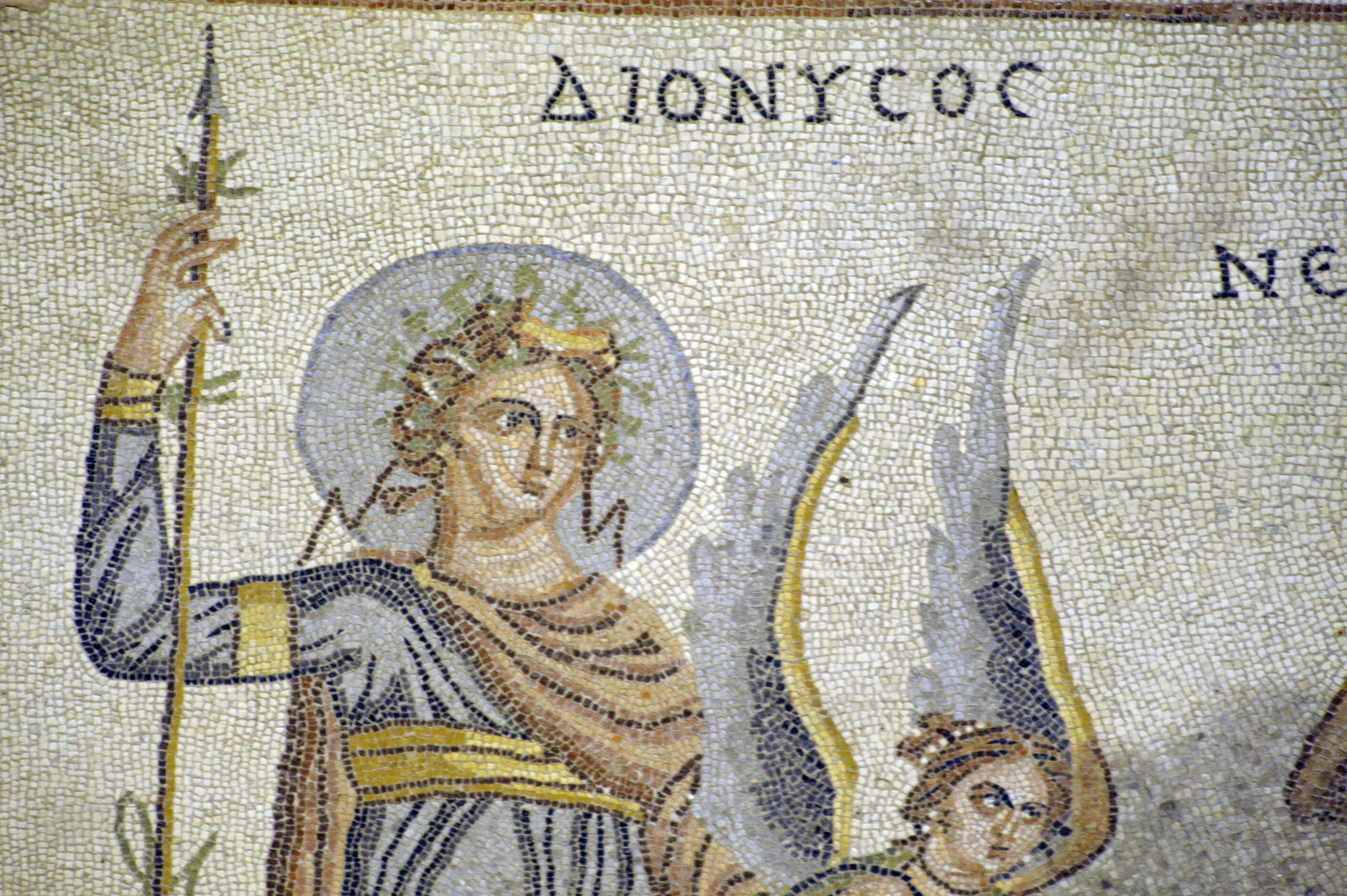
Mosaic of Dionysus, the deity featured most prominently in the Orphic Hymns, from the House of Poseidon in Zeugma, 3rd century AD

Of the deities featured in the Orphic Hymns, Dionysus is given the place of greatest prominence. He is the recipient of eight separate hymns (more than any other deity), which address him in various manifestations, and constitute the central portion of the collection. (Note: Ricciardelli 2008, pp. 332, 343. The eight hymns to Dionysus, under various names, are those to Dionysus (Hymn 30), Mise (Hymn 42), Dionysus Bassareus Trieterikos (Hymn 45), Liknites (Hymn 46), Perikionios (Hymn 47), Lysios Lenaios (Hymn 50), Trieterikos (Hymn 52), and Amphietes (Hymn 53).) Numerous deities in the collection are related to or associated with Dionysus, and he is explicitly mentioned in twenty-two of the eighty-seven hymns, often using an epithet. The collection refers to myths about Dionysus which are known within the mainstream Greek tradition (though these references are seemingly to unusual variants of these stories), as well as to myths without attestation elsewhere.

The Hymns display particular concern for one part of Dionysus's mythology, the story of his three births. There exist two main traditions around the birth of Dionysus: the standard version, in which he is the child of Zeus and Semele, and an Orphic version, in which he is born to Zeus and his daughter, Persephone. The Orphic Hymns reference both of these parentages, mentioning the birth of Eubuleus (a name for Dionysus) to Zeus and Persephone in an "unspeakable union", and later calling Semele the mother of Dionysus; (Note: Rudhardt 2002, pp. 489–491; OH 30.6–7 (Athanassakis & Wolkow, p. 27; Quandt, p. 25), 44.3 (Athanassakis & Wolkow, p. 38; Quandt, p. 33).) according to Rudhardt, this is not an inadvertent inclusion of contradictory versions, but a deliberate reference to a system in which Dionysus has two consecutive mothers. In Rudhardt's view, these two successive births can only be explained by the Orphic myth of the dismemberment of Dionysus – in which Dionysus, the infant son of Zeus and Persephone, is ripped apart and eaten by the Titans, and then subsequently reincarnated – which would, in the Hymns, place Persephone as his first mother and Semele as his second. (Note: Rudhardt 2002, pp. 493–495; Rudhardt 2008, Chapter II, paras. 64–65. For a general outline of the myth of Dionysus's dismemberment, see Meisner 2018, p. 237.) His third birth is from the thigh of the Phrygian god Sabazios (here closely linked to Zeus), who stitches the young child there after his birth from Semele. (Note: Rudhardt 2008, Chapter II, paras. 146–147. On this event following the birth from Semele, see Morand 1997, p. 176. This is identified as his third birth by Malamis, p. 212 and Fayant 2014, p. 677.)

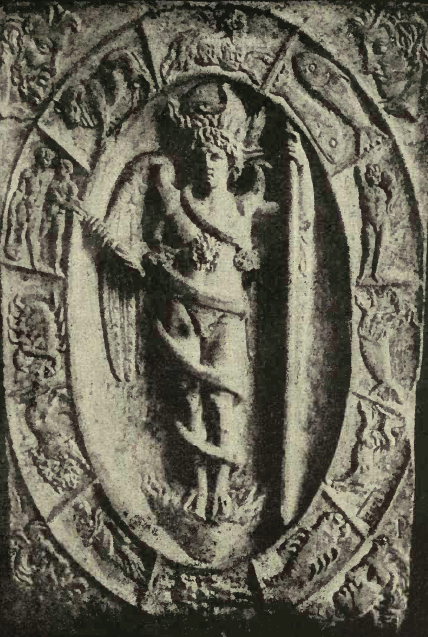
Relief of Protogonos, an Orphic god found in the Hymns, from Modena, 2nd century AD

Most of the gods mentioned in the Orphic Hymns are known within mainstream Greek mythology. The only deity in the collection typically held as Orphic is Protogonos, the "first-born" god who emerges from an egg, also referred to as Ericepaios, Phanes, Priapus, and Antauges; he is addressed in Orphic Hymn 6, which portrays him in a manner derived directly from the Orphic tradition. Zeus is the recipient of three hymns, and is depicted in a manner largely in line with his characterisation in the standard Greek tradition, (Note: Rudhardt 2008, Chapter II, paras. 6, 22. The three hymns are those to Zeus (Hymn 15), Zeus Keraunios (Hymn 19), and Zeus Astrapeus (Hymn 20).) though Fayant sees Orphic Hymn 15 as alluding to the Orphic myth of Zeus's swallowing of Protogonos (which is known to have appeared in Orphic theogonies). (Note: Fayant 2014, pp. 700–703; OH 15.3–5 (Athanassakis & Wolkow, p. 17; Quandt, p. 15). On the Orphic myth of Zeus's swallowing of Protogonos, see Meisner 2018, pp. 219–236.) Rudhardt argues that Protogonos and Zeus, along with Dionysus, should be understood as aspects of a single, tripartite Orphic deity. The collection also references the myth of Persephone's abduction, alluding to her capture by Pluto in a meadow and later describing Mother Antaia (a name of Demeter) as searching in the underworld for her lost daughter. (Note: Ricciardelli 2008, pp. 332–333; OH 18.12–15 (Athanassakis & Wolkow, p. 19; Quandt, pp. 17–18), 42.3–7 (Athanassakis & Wolkow, p. 36; Quandt, p. 32).) Heracles, who is portrayed quite differently from traditional depictions, is made both a Titan and a solar deity. Several gods addressed in the Orphic Hymns – Mise, Hipta, and Melinoe – have little or no literary attestation beyond the Hymns, and were unknown outside the collection until their discovery in inscriptions from Asia Minor. (Note: Athanassakis & Wolkow, p. x. Mise and Hipta do have some attestation elsewhere in literature, whereas Melinoe, outside of the Hymns, is only mentioned in an inscription.) This epigraphic evidence, which is roughly contemporaneous with the Hymns, indicates deities such as Mise and Hipta were not invented by the collection's author. The Hymns also contain several references to well-known foreign deities such as Men, a god worshipped in Asia Minor, and the Egyptian goddess Isis.

A number of the gods featured in the Hymns are identified with one another. Through attributing similar characteristics to two different deities, the collection can bring these gods closer to each other, almost to the point of them merging; (Note: Rudhardt 1991, p. 273. Rudhardt 1991, pp. 273–274 also points out that deities who are identified with each other tend to be genealogically connected.) these pairs of gods are not completely assimilated, however, as each deity, while adopting features of the other god, still retains their own individual characteristics. Although Jane Ellen Harrison, writing at the beginning of the 20th century, saw this identifying tendency as conferring upon the collection an "atmosphere of mystical monotheism", (Note: Morand 2010a, p. 149, quoting Harrison, p. 625.) this idea of a monotheistic bent to the Hymns has been rejected by more recent scholars. Giulia Sfameni Gasparro argues that the collection should instead be understood as henotheistic, revolving around the chief deity of Dionysus, who is simultaneously singular and multifarious. Two deities who are prominently identified with one another in the collection are Dionysus and Protogonos: both are described at times as possessing bull-like features, or as being "dual" or "double" in nature, and Dionysus, in his own hymn, is at one point directly addressed as "Protogonos". Other examples of deities who are identified with each other in the Hymns include Artemis and Hecate, Rhea and the Mother of the Gods, and Demeter and Mother Antaia. Scholars have also noted the similarity between how deities are identified in the Hymns and other works of Orphic literature, with the collection seeming to follow an existing Orphic tradition in linking certain pairs of gods. (Note: For example, see Rudhardt 2008, Chapter II, para. 155 with n. 229, 177, 266.)

== Transmission and scholarship ==
=== Textual history ===
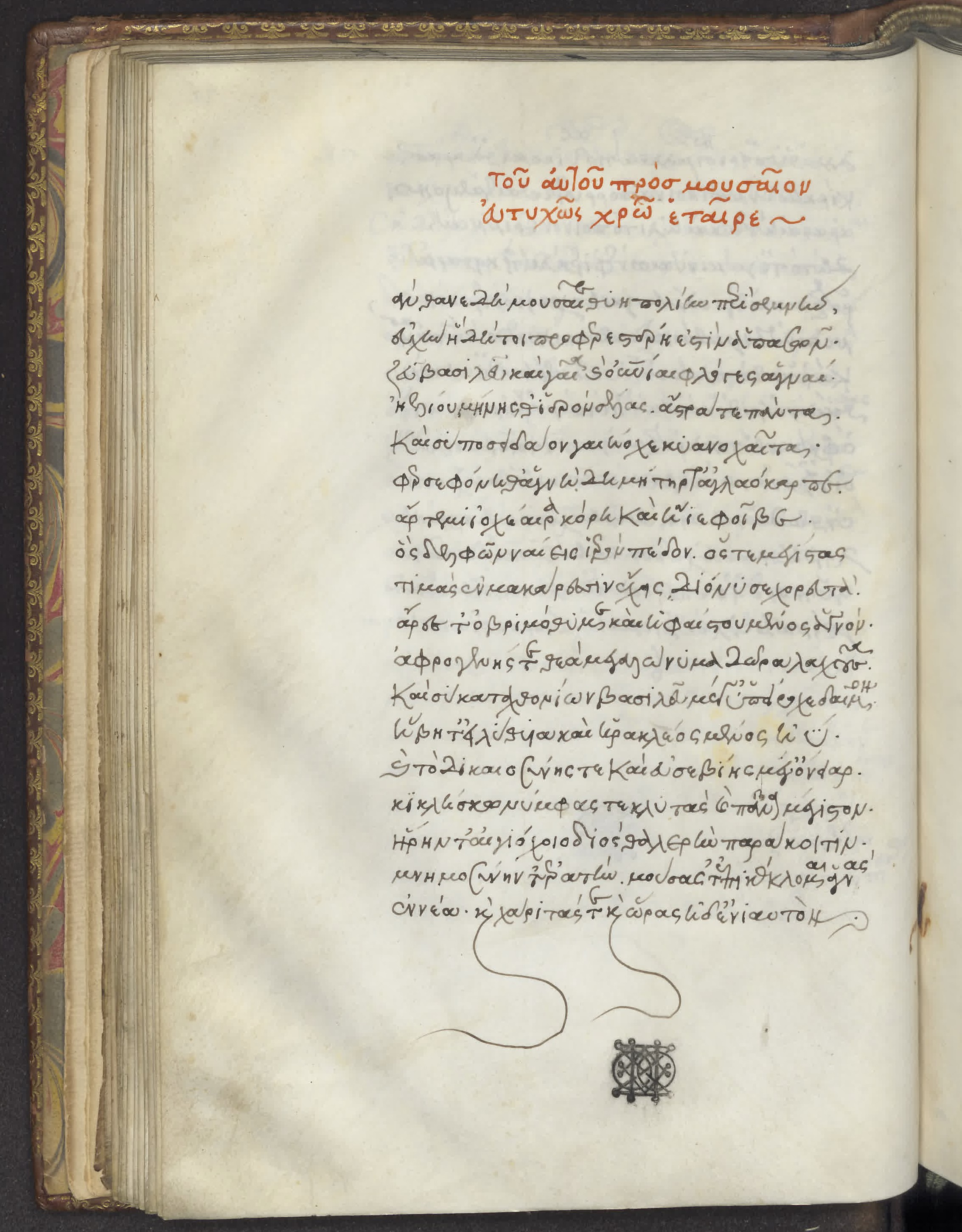
A page from the Leidensis BPG 74C manuscript, which dates to the 15th century, and is part of the φ (phi) family. (Note: Quandt, pp. 6*, 13*. For this dating, see the "stemma général" in Vian 1980.) This page contains the first 18 lines of the proem.

There are no extant references to the Orphic Hymns from antiquity; hymns attributed to Orpheus are mentioned in works such as the Derveni papyrus (4th century BC) and Pausanias's Description of Greece (2nd century AD), though these almost certainly do not refer to the collection of eighty-seven hymns. The earliest definite reference to the Hymns comes from the Byzantine writer John Diaconus Galenus, who has been dated to the 12th century AD. (Note: Roilos, pp. 231–232. He has a terminus ante quem of the early 14th century, and West 1968, p. 288 n. 3 states that he "cannot be earlier than the ninth century".) Galenus mentions the collection thrice in his commentary on Hesiod's Theogony, referring to epithets from the hymns to Helios and Selene, (Note: Hunsucker, p. 5; John Diaconus Galenus, on Hesiod's Theogony, 381 (Flach, p. 328).) and quoting lines from those to Helios and Hecate; (Note: Hunsucker, p. 6; John Diaconus Galenus, on Hesiod's Theogony, 381 (Flach, p. 330).) he notes "Orpheus" as the source in all three citations, and at one point mentions fragrances in reference to the collection, indicating he possessed a manuscript which contained offerings. Although no extant references to the Hymns exist before Galenus, the collection would have been known in literary circles in the centuries following its composition, and it may have influenced later works such as the Orphic Argonautica (4th century AD) and the Dionysiaca of Nonnus (5th century AD). (Note: Fayant 2014, p. xxxv. On the relation of the Dionysiaca to the Orphic Hymns, see Otlewska-Jung, pp. 77–96.)

At some point between the 5th to 13th century AD, the Orphic Hymns were collected into a single codex, which also contained the Homeric Hymns, the Orphic Argonautica, and the Hymns of Callimachus and Proclus. (Note: Càssola, p. lxv; cf. West 2003, p. 21, who states that this occurred "[s]ometime in late antiquity, or more likely in the early Middle Ages".) The earliest known codex containing the Orphic Hymns to arrive in Western Europe was brought to Venice from Constantinople by Giovanni Aurispa in 1423, (Note: Athanassakis & Wolkow, p. ix; Quandt, p. 10*. The codex also included the Homeric Hymns and the Hymns of Callimachus.) and shortly afterwards, in 1427, Francesco Filelfo brought to Italy another codex containing the collection; both of these manuscripts are now lost. (Note: Quandt, p. 10*; Athanassakis & Wolkow, p. ix. In total, there are six lost codices which we know of.) The surviving codices, of which there are around forty, all date between about 1450 and 1550, and often include the Orphic Argonautica, the Homeric Hymns, Hesiodic works, and the Hymns of Callimachus and Proclus. (Note: Borgeaud 2014, p. 214; Athanassakis & Wolkow, p. ix; Fayant 2014, p. xxxiv. Quandt, pp. 3*–9* lists a total of thirty-seven surviving manuscripts, and Ricciardelli 2000, pp. 3–4 includes five not mentioned by Quandt; all of these are listed by Malamis, pp. 457–459, who also includes a forty-second manuscript.)

Most (or perhaps all) of the extant codices descend from a single archetype, denoted in scholarship by the siglum Ψ (psi), (Note: Malamis, p. 19, figure 1; Quandt, p. 45*. Quandt believed that all of the manuscripts descended from Ψ, though it has since been proposed that some manuscripts may have had independent sources..) which probably dated to the 12th or 13th century, and was a paper manuscript with text written in minuscule; (Note: Malamis, p. 17. The codex also contained the Homeric Hymns, the Orphic Argonautica, and the hymns by Callimachus and Proclus. The text of the Orphic Hymns in the archetype would have spanned eighteen pages, with thirty-two lines to each page.) it arrived in Italy in the first half of the 15th century, and may have been the manuscript transported by Aurispa to Venice. From this manuscript were derived four apographs (or transcribed copies) – namely φ (phi), θ (theta), A, and B, in chronological order of transcription – which were produced as the archetype gradually suffered damage. Various further manuscripts are descended from the subarchetypes φ and θ, with both manuscripts being recoverable only from these descendants, while A and B, which omit the Homeric Hymns (and in the latter case the Hymns of Callimachus also), are preserved in surviving editions. Another extant manuscript, h, is of less clear origin, and may not have derived its text from Ψ; West suggests that in one hymn it makes use of a separate source.

In the latter part of the 15th century, Marsilio Ficino, a Neoplatonist, translated the Orphic Hymns into Latin as a youth, seemingly producing the first translation of the collection, though it remained unpublished. (Note: Schwab, pp. 302–303 with n. 5; Hunsucker, p. 8 with n. 2. According to Hunsucker, Ficino probably made this translation in the 1460s.) The editio princeps (or first printed edition) of the Hymns was produced in Florence in 1500 by Filippo Giunta; (Note: Hunsucker, p. 9; Quandt, p. 5*. The edition also contained the Orphic Argonautica and the Hymns of Proclus.) this codex, denoted in scholarship by the siglum Iunt, is descended from φ. This was followed by the publication of an edition by the Aldine Press in 1517, and the first printing of a translation (into Latin) of the collection in 1519, written by Marcus Musurus. By the end of the 16th century, a total of six editions had been published, (Note: Athanassakis & Wolkow, p. ix. For a list of these editions, see Quandt, p. 58.) including the 1566 edition by Henri Estienne. Estienne's volume remained the standard edition of the text for the following two centuries, until the publication, in 1764, of Johann Matthias Gesner's Orphica, which included a number of corrections that had been put forward by 18th-century scholars.

Editions of the Hymns from prior centuries were surpassed by the version of the text in the voluminous 1805 collection of Orphic literature by Gottfried Hermann. Hermann proposed over 170 corrections to the text of the Hymns, and his edition was the first to contain a critical apparatus. He was also the first scholar to split the hymn to Hecate from the proem, presenting it as the first hymn in the collection, a choice which almost all subsequent editions have followed. The first complete English translation of the collection was produced in 1787 by the Neoplatonist Thomas Taylor, and the first complete German translation, by David Karl Philipp Dietsch, was published in 1822. (Note: Hunsucker, p. 12. For the date of Taylor's translation, see Malamis, p. 153 with n. 53.) Hermann's edition of Orphic literature was followed in 1885 by that of Jenő Ábel, whose edition of the Hymns was pilloried by subsequent scholars, particularly for its lack of consideration of the manuscript tradition. The critical edition by Wilhelm Quandt (to which Paul Maas contributed) (Note: On the contribution of Paul Maas to Quandt's edition, see Morand 2017, paras. 2–3.) was published in 1941, followed in 1955 by its second edition. Quandt sought to provide an accurate reconstruction of Ψ, with the exception of a number of what he perceived to be spelling errors in the archetype, which he corrects; (Note: Blumenthal, pp. 141–142; cf. Quandt, pp. 37*–38*.) his rendering of Ψ has served as the basis of subsequent editions. Recent versions of the Hymns include the 1977 English translation by Apostolos Athanassakis, the first since Taylor's, the 2000 edition, with Italian translation and commentary, by Gabriela Ricciardelli, and the 2014 Budé edition by Marie-Christine Fayant, with French translation and commentary.

=== Reception and scholarship ===
In the mid 15th century, following the arrival of the codex brought by Aurispa to Venice, the Orphic Hymns seem to have attained a level of popularity amongst the educated of Renaissance Italy. This attention to the work may have been due to the Greek scholar and Neoplatonist Gemistos Plethon, who visited Florence around this time; Plethon is known to have been familiar with the Orphic Hymns, having produced an autograph of a selection of the hymns (Note: Diller, p. 37; Woodhouse, p. 62; cf. Hladký, pp. 43, 265–266.) (a codex which scholars have identified as the source of the h family of manuscripts). (Note: West 1970, p. 304; Malamis, p. 19.) Ficino, whose work may have been influenced by Plethon, believed that the Hymns were the genuine writings of Orpheus, and appears to have had a liking for singing their contents, believing that the collection was capable of "bringing the human soul into alignment with the harmonies of the heavens". (Note: Voss, pp. 232–233; Walker, pp. 101–103. The line quoted here is from Voss.) Subsequent Renaissance writers, such as Pico della Mirandola, viewed the Hymns as having deep theological doctrines hidden within them, and saw the various gods they mention as merely aspects of a single, underlying god.

In the 1540s, Agostino Steuco and Giglio Gregorio Giraldi put forward the idea that the collection was the work of another Orpheus, who supposedly lived long after the original Orpheus was believed to have existed. Daniel Heinsius, writing in 1627, attributed the collection to the Athenian Onomacritus (6th to 5th century BC), to whom Orphic poetry had sometimes been ascribed in antiquity, and this idea of the Onomacritan authorship of the Hymns became the dominant view in the 17th century. (Note: Malamis, pp. 145–148. For this dating, see Heinze, para. 1.) By 1689, Henri Estienne had expressed scepticism towards this attribution, while in the mid-18th century Jean-Baptiste Souchay wrote that Onomacritus had simply modified the dialect of the Orphic Hymns to Ionic Greek, but that they were genuinely written by Orpheus, having been produced earlier than the 5th century BC.

In the late 18th century, the Göttingen school of history lambasted the idea that Orphic literature was a product of early antiquity; Johann Gottlob Schneider argued, on the basis of their lack of mention among ancient authors, that the Orphic Hymns were produced in late antiquity (probably in the 3rd century AD) for use in the debate over Orphism and Orpheus at that time between Christian and Neoplatonic apologists. (Note: Malamis, pp. 150–151. For a discussion of this debate, see Edmonds 2013a, pp. 27–47.) Schneider decried the Hymns as a "hogwash of mystical sayings and allegorical prattlings", while his contemporary, Christoph Meiners, described their style as horridus, and supported a late dating, viewing the collection as containing a kind of confused Stoicism. Around the same time, in 1780, Dietrich Tiedemann argued that the individual hymns in the collection were of highly diverse origins and dates, with the surviving collection of Orphic Hymns simply being a compilation. In contrast to this sceptical approach, Taylor, writing in his translation of the Hymns, adopted a mystical view of the collection, and claimed they had belonged to the Eleusinian Mysteries (a Greek mystery cult from Eleusis).

At the start of the 19th century, scholars such as Georg Friedrich Creuzer and Friedrich Sickler believed that the Hymns, while composed in (or possibly after) the Hellenistic period, were a later rendering of a much earlier collection. (Note: Malamis, p. 157. Malamis notes that both scholars were putting forward arguments which were bolstered by an early dating of the collection. Compare their views with that of Johann Gerlach in 1797, on which see Hunsucker, p. 21; Malamis, pp. 157–158.) Christian Lobeck, writing in his 1829 work Aglaophamus, held that the collection was composed by an individual from the Byzantine era, and rejected the idea of them belonging to a cult community, believing that their author produced them as a scholarly exercise. Several decades later, Christian Petersen posed a challenge to Lobeck's view, arguing that the collection showed a strong influence of Stoic thought, as indicated by the appearance of certain Stoic personifications, and the tendency to treat deities as though they are aspects of nature. On the basis of this perceived Stoic influence, he dated the collection to around the 1st or 2nd centuries AD.

In the late 19th century, excavations in western Asia Minor brought to light epigraphic evidence which led to the establishment of the idea that the Orphic Hymns had been liturgical in function. The discovery, around the time of Petersen's work, of inscriptions containing the word boukólos (βουκόλος) (a religious title which appears in the Hymns), led Rudolf Schöll to postulate in 1879 that the Hymns had belonged to a Bacchic mystery group. Around a decade later, Albrecht Dieterich, in a study of the Hymns recognised by scholars as definitively establishing their ritual nature, concluded that the collection belonged to a cult community which engaged in mysteries, and judged that this group possessed an internal hierarchy. He dated the collection to around the 1st or 2nd centuries BC, and locates its origins to a coastal region of either Asia Minor or Egypt (with him favouring the city of Alexandria as its location). Ernst Maass, writing in 1895, claimed that the term boukólos referred to Orpheus himself, while, ten years later, Zdenko Baudnik studied the Stoic characteristics of the Hymns in detail, and supported the idea of an Alexandrian origin.

Around the beginning of the 20th century, the discovery of inscriptions in western Asia Minor to deities featured in the Hymns, such as Hipta, Erikepaios, and Melinoe, led Otto Kern to conclude in 1910 that the collection was composed in Asia Minor, for use by a Dionysian cult; a year later, he argued that the Hymns originated specifically from Pergamon, and that the cult community which used them existed at the sanctuary of Demeter in the city, where inscriptions to a number of deities addressed in the collection had been discovered. (Note: Linforth, p. 185; Malamis, p. 172. The sanctuary, which was unearthed in 1910, is a témenos (τέμενος). Among the deities mentioned in the inscriptions found in the sanctuary are Mise, Melinoe, the Winds, Asclepius, and Night; notably, there is no mention of Dionysus.) His view that the Hymns originated in Asia Minor received widespread acceptance, though his argument that their location could be narrowed down to Pergamon was treated with greater scepticism. Kern later argued, in 1940, that the surviving collection is the product of an originally Dionysian work having been edited by a Stoic interpolator, who attached the proem and further hymns.

Following the publication of Kern's papers on the location of the Hymns' composition, scholars such as Felix Jacoby and W. K. C. Guthrie argued that the collection belonged to an Orphic society, though the latter considered it improbable that the group was "Orphic in the strict sense of accepting the whole body of Orphic dogma". (Note: Ricciardelli 2000, p. xxxvii. For the quoted passage, see Guthrie 1952, p. 259.) In 1930, Leonard van Liempt studied the collection's vocabulary, concluding that it was similar to that used in 3rd- and 4th-century AD poetry. Several years later, Ulrich von Wilamowitz-Moellendorff judged that the Hymns lacked all poetic merit, and half a century afterwards, in 1983, Martin Litchfield West dismissed them as evidence merely of "cheerful and inexpensive dabbling in religion by a literary-minded burgher and his friends". (Note: Graf 2009, p. 170; Malamis, pp. 184–185. Graf and Malamis are quoting West 1983, p. 29.) After the publication of Quandt's edition, the Hymns received little attention until towards the end of the 20th century, when scholarly interest in the collection was rekindled, driven mainly by the work of Jean Rudhardt. In the wake of Rudhardt's writings, the 21st-century scholarship of the Hymns has, according to Daniel Malamis, moved beyond the view held by scholars such as Wilamowitz and West that they were "trivial or low-brow", with recent scholars focusing in particular on the "ritual and performative aspect" of the collection.

== List of the Orphic Hymns ==
No.	Title (usually including offering)	Addressee	Identity of Addressee	Lines	Content	Ref.
1	None (Note: In the manuscripts in which the Orphic Hymns survive, the hymn to Hecate is appended to the proem, without division, a separate title, or the specification of an offering. Some scholars have also argued that it may not have originally been part of the collection.)	Hecate	Sepulchral goddess in Greek religion	10	Connects her with Artemis, associates her with the Moon	
2	"Offering of Prothyraia, storax"	Prothyraia	Epithet of Hecate, Eileithyia, and Artemis	14	Assimilates her with Artemis, celebrates her role in promoting childbirth	
3	"Offering of Nyx, firebrands"	Nyx	Personification of Night in the Theogony	14	Describes her as mother of gods and men, calls her Cypris, an epithet of Aphrodite	
4	"Offering of Ouranos, frankincense"	Uranus	Father of the Titans in the Theogony	9	Emphasises his antiquity, identifies him with the cosmos	
5	"Offering of Aither, saffron"	Aether	Uppermost level of the atmosphere	6	Describes it as the dwelling of Zeus	
6	"Offering of Protogonos, myrrh"	Protogonos	Important god in Orphic literature	11	Portrays him similarly to Orphic tradition, as born from an egg in a burst of light	
7	"Offering of the Stars, spices"	Stars	The stars, treated as divinities	13	Describes them as children of Night, and as controlling human destiny	
8	"Offering for Helios, gum of frankincense"	Helios	God with a cult from at least Homer's time	20	Describes him as a Titan, refers to him under the name Hyperion	
9	"Offering for Selene, spices"	Selene	Daughter of Hyperion in the Theogony	12	Focuses on her astronomical role as the moon, calls her "mother of time"	
10	"Offering of Physis, spices"	Physis	Nature, sometimes a personification in philosophical literature	30	Depicts Physis as a mysterious force which pervades the world	
11	"Offering of Pan, various"	Pan	God who is half-goat, initially from Arcadia	23	Represents him as rustic god, who protects shepherds, and as a cosmic god	
12	"Offering of Herakles, frankincense"	Heracles	Greek hero who performs labours	16	Describes him as a solar deity, seemingly identifies him with Apollo	
13	"Offering of Kronos, storax"	Cronus	Youngest of the Titans	10	Addresses him as controller of the cosmos, and of natural activity	
14	"Offering of Rhea, spices"	Rhea	Titan and mother of Zeus	14	Calls her the daughter of Protogonos, identifies her with Cybele	
15	"Offering of Zeus, storax"	Zeus	Ruler of the cosmos in the Theogony	11	Characterises him similarly to the regular Greek tradition	
16	"Offering of Hera, spices"	Hera	Wife of Zeus, daughter of Cronus	10	Identifies her with the air	
17	"Offering of Poseidon, myrrh"	Poseidon	God of the sea, brother of Zeus	10	Addresses him as ruler of the sea, and as being able to shake the earth	
18	"For Pluto"	Pluto	Name for Hades, originally a separate god	19	Describes him in his role as an underworld god	
19	"Offering of Zeus Keraunos, storax"	Zeus Keraunios	"Zeus the Thunderer" (Note: Downey, p. 25. Different manuscripts provide the hymn with different titles, and it can be read as either Κεραυνίου Διός or Κεραυνοῦ Διός; Ricciardelli translates these two phrases as, respectively, Zeus Folgoratore and Fulmine di Zeus. Here the latter reading is adopted, following Ricciardelli.)	23	Provides a detailed physical description of the thunderbolt	
20	"Offering of Zeus Astrapeus, gum of frankincense"	Zeus Astrapeus	Zeus "of the lightning"	6	Describes the sight and sound of Zeus's lightning, and its dangerous power	
21	"Offering of the Nephe, myrrh"	Nephe	Clouds	7	Treats them as natural phenomena, producing rain and thunder	
22	"Offering of Thalassa, gum of frankincense"	Thalassa	Sea	10	Identifies her with Tethys	
23	"Offering of Nereus: myrrh"	Nereus	Son of Pontus in the Theogony	8	Associates him with earthquakes	
24	"Offering of the Nereids, spices"	Nereids	Daughters of Nereus and Doris	12	Describes them as revealing the rite of Bacchus and Persephone	
25	"Offering of Proteus, storax"	Proteus	An "Old Man of the Sea" in the Odyssey	25	Describes him as all-knowing, and asks him to give foresight	
26	"Offering of Ge, every seed except beans and spices"	Gaia	Earth, a mother goddess	11	Describes her as providing nourishment, and also treats her as a cosmic body	
27	"Offering of the Mother of the Gods, various"	Mother of the Gods	Cybele, a Phrygian goddess	14	Identifies her with Rhea, as well as Hestia	
28	"Offering of Hermes, frankincense"	Hermes	Son of Zeus and Maia	12	Emphasises his role in the domain of language	
29	"Hymn of Persephone"	Persephone	Daughter of Zeus and Demeter, abducted by Hades	20	Depicts her as dual, as both a fertility goddess and queen of the underworld	
30	"Offering of Dionysos, storax"	Dionysus	God described as being born three times	9	Describes him as son of Zeus and Persephone, identifies him with Protogonos	
31	"Hymn of the Kouretes"	Kouretes (Note: The Kouretes are also addressed in Orphic Hymn 38.)	Group of men who noisily dance around the infant Zeus	7	Connects them to mountains, uses epithets which allude to their part in Zeus's infancy	
32	"Offering of Athena, spices"	Athena	Major Greek deity, popular in cult	17	In addition to typical descriptions, associates her with mountains and caves	
33	"Offering of Nike, manna"	Nike	Victory, daughter of Styx and Pallas	9	Associates her with war	
34	"Offering of Apollo, manna"	Apollo	Major Greek god, son of Zeus and Leto	27	Presents a traditional depiction, then addresses him as a cosmic solar god	
35	"Offering of Leto, myrrh"	Leto	Mother of Apollo and Artemis	7	Emphasis her role as mother of her children	
36	"Offering of Artemis, manna"	Artemis	Sister of Apollo, connected with Asia Minor	16	Depicts her traditionally, as a hunting goddess, and goddess of childbirth (Note: Rudhardt 2008, Chapter II, para. 210. The hymn brings attention to the apparent paradox of her being a goddess of childbirth, but having not given birth herself. It also applies the epithet "Titanine" to her.)	
37	"Offering of the Titans, frankincense"	Titans	Twelve offspring of Earth and Sky	9	Describes them as ancestors of all living creatures (Note: Morand 2001, pp. 216–217. According to Morand, as this places the Titans as ancestors of mankind, this passage is a possible reference to the so-called "Orphic anthropogony", the purportedly Orphic idea of humans containing within themselves a form of original fault. Christopher A. Faraone has identified this hymn as a thumokatachon, a kind of magical spell attested elsewhere in Greek literature.)	
38	"Offering of the Kouretes, frankincense"	Kouretes (Note: The Kouretes are also addressed in Orphic Hymn 31.)	Group of men who noisily dance around the infant Zeus	25	Portrays them as being winds, describes them as living on Samothrace	
39	"Offering of Korybant, frankincense"	Corybant	Singular form of "Corybantes", figures who worship Cybele (Note: Athanassakis & Wolkow, p. 142. On the identity of the figure addressed here, see Ricciardelli 2000, p. 388.)	10	Describes him as capable of dispelling fears	
40	"Offering of Demeter Eleusinia, storax"	Eleusinian Demeter	Major fertility deity, goddess of agriculture	20	Describes her as the first to have harvested crops, calls her "torch-bearing"	
41	"Offering of Mother Antaia, spices"	Mother Antaia	Name for Demeter	10	Describes her search for Persephone in the underworld (Note: Rudhardt 2008, Chapter II, paras. 119–120, 122. According to Rudhardt, this hymn shows the influence of an Orphic version of the myth of the abduction of Persephone.)	
42	"Offering of Mise, storax"	Mise	Goddess attested in Anatolian inscriptions	11	Identifies her with Dionysus, describes her as the daughter of Isis	
43	"Offering of the Horai, spices"	Horae	Personifications of the seasons	11	Connects them with nature, references Persephone's return from the underworld	
44	"Offering of Semele, storax"	Semele	Mother of Dionysus by Zeus	11	Alludes to her death upon witnessing Zeus's true form	
45	"Hymn of Dionysos Bassareus Trieterikos"	Dionysus Bassareus Trieterikos	Manifestation of Dionysus (Note: Athanassakis & Wolkow, p. 152. Bassareus is a form of Dionysus in which he is wearing the fur of a fox, while Trieterikos, meaning "triennial", is the name for the god to whom the Trieterides festival was dedicated.)	7	References a "maenadic ritual", mentions Dionysus's thyrsus	
46	"Offering of Liknites, manna"	Liknites	Cult title of Dionysus (Note: Athanassakis & Wolkow, p. 153. The name means "he who is in the liknon" (λίκνον), and was identified by the 5th- or 6th-century AD Hesychius as an epithet of Dionysus; according to Ricciardelli, the name should thus be taken as referring to the infant Dionysus.)	8	Associates Dionysus with vegetation, describes Persephone as his nurse	
47	"Offering of Perikionios, spices"	Perikionios	Manifestation of Dionysus (Note: Athanassakis & Wolkow, p. 155. The name Perikionios, which means "which surrounds the column", was a cult epithet of Dionysus from Thebes. Dionysus was worshipped in the form of the ivy which wrapped around a column at the location of his mother's death.)	6	Describes his protection of Cadmus's palace	
48	"Offering of Sabazios, spices"	Sabazius	God from Phrygia, honoured in Greek cult	6	Describes him as stitching Dionysus into his thigh	
49	"Offering of Hipta, storax"	Hipta	Goddess mentioned in Lydian inscriptions	7	Describes her as rearing Dionysus, and as glorifying the rite of Sabazios	
50	"(Hymn) of Lysios Lenaios"	Lysios Lenaios	Two epithets of Dionysus	10	Associates Dionysus with vegetation, calls him "Epaphian" (Note: Edmonds 2013b, p. 415. Edmonds believes that this hymn, through its use of this epithet, is assimilating Dionysus with an Egyptian figure "who is identified in various sources as Osiris, Apis, and Epaphus".)	
51	"Offering of the Nymphs, spices"	Nymphs	Young women who are nature divinities	19	Describes them as "nurses of Bacchus", and daughters of Oceanus	
52	"Offering of Trieterikos, spices"	Trieterikos	Dionysus, god of the trieterides (Note: Ricciardelli 2000, p. 432. The trieterides (meaning "triennial") were festivals which took place every second year (and so in the modern day would be considered biennial).)	13	Calls Dionysus "of many names", applies numerous epithets to him	
53	"Offering of Amphietes, everything except frankincense, and offer milk"	Amphietes	Dionysus (Note: Athanassakis & Wolkow, p. 163. For a discussion of this name, and its relation to the name of the previous hymn, see Ricciardelli 2000, pp. 436–437.)	10	Describes Dionysus as "chthonic", associates him with vegetation	
54	"Offering of Silenos, Satyros, Bakkhai, manna"	Silenus, Satyrs, Bacchae	Figures in the thiasos of Dionysus	11	Describes Silenus as leading the Naiads and Bacchae in the Lenaian rite	
55	"For Aphrodite"	Aphrodite	Goddess of love and sex	29	Calls Necessity her daughter, lists locations of significance to her	
56	"Offering of Adonis, spices"	Adonis	Fertility god, Near Eastern in origin	12	Identifies him with Dionysus, says he is born of Persephone	
57	"Offering of Hermes Chthonios, storax"	Hermes Chthonius	Chthonic Hermes, associated with the dead	12	Calls him the son of Dionysus and Aphrodite	
58	"Offering of Eros, spices"	Eros	One of the earliest gods in the Theogony	10	Describes him as "playing" with gods and mortals, calls him "two-natured"	
59	"Offering of the Moirai, spices"	Moirai	The Fates, often three in number	21	Tells of their cosmic abode, and how they look over mortals	
60	"Offering of the Charites, storax"	Charites	Female deities, often associated with the Horae	7	Calls them daughters of Lawfulness (a Hora)	
61	"Hymn of Nemesis"	Nemesis	Goddess who punishes transgressive mortals	12	Describes her as monitoring the speech and thoughts of mortals	
62	"Offering of Dike, frankincense"	Dike	Hora in the Theogony	11	Refers to her "all-seeing eye", mentions her as having a place on Zeus's throne	
63	"Offering of Dikaiosyne, frankincense"	Dikaiosyne	Goddess difficult to distinguish from Dike	16	Connects her with the image of scales	
64	"Hymn of Nomos"	Nomos	Law, sometimes the father of Dike or Dikaiosyne	13	Describes him as law operating in the cosmic and mortal realms	
65	"Offering of Ares, frankincense"	Ares	God of war	9	Calls him Cypris, an epithet of Aphrodite, and Lyaeus, an epithet of Dionysus	
66	"Offering of Hephaistos, gum of frankincense"	Hephaestus	Blacksmith god, often the son of Zeus and Hera	13	Refers to Hephaestus as the element of fire, in the universe and the body	
67	"Offering of Asklepios, manna"	Asclepius	Divine physician, with some worship	9	Calls him Paean, an epithet of Apollo, calls him Apollo's son	
68	"Offering of Hygeia, manna"	Hygeia	Health, often associated with Asclepius	13	States that she is adored by everyone, except for Hades	
69	"Offering of the Erinnyes, storax and manna"	Erinyes	Female figures who enact vengeance upon criminals	17	Places their home next to the River Styx, describes them similarly to the Moirai	
70	"Offering of the Eumenides, spices"	Eumenides	The "benevolent aspect" of the Erinyes	11	Describes them as even more petrifying than in the previous hymn (Note: Ricciardelli 2000, p. 492. Ricciardelli remarks that the nature of this description may indicate verses were swapped between the two at some point.)	
71	"Offering of Melinoe, spices"	Melinoe	Goddess with no literary attestation elsewhere (Note: Athanassakis & Wolkow, p. 195. The only mention of Melinoe outside of the Orphic Hymns is in an inscription on a device used for magical purposes.)	12	Connects her with Hecate, describes her as Persephone's daughter	
72	"Offering of Tyche, frankincense"	Tyche	Goddess of fortune and fate	10	Says she is born from the blood of Eubuleus, identifies her with Artemis	
73	"Offering of Daimon, frankincense"	Daimon	Figure similar to Tyche	9	Calls him Zeus, applies the epithet ploutodoten ('giver of wealth') to him	
74	"Offering of Leukothea, storax"	Leucothea	Sea goddess	10	Calls her a nurse of Dionysus, asks her to save boats at sea	
75	"Offering of Palaimon, manna"	Palaemon	Sea god, who was originally Melicertes (Note: Athanassakis & Wolkow, pp. 200, 202. After being pursued by her crazed husband to the edge of a coastal cliff, Ino, clutching her son Melicertes, jumps from the edge; the gods of the sea turn her into Leucothea, and her son into Palaemon.)	8	Places him as part of the thiasos of Dionysus	
76	"Offering of the Muses, frankincense"	Muses	Daughters of Zeus and Persephone	12	Describes them as teaching the mysteries	
77	"Offering of Mnemosyne, frankincense"	Mnemosyne	Mother of the Muses by Zeus	10	Describes her as being able to revive memories	
78	"Offering of Eos, manna"	Eos	Dawn, who rises at the edge of the world each morning	13	Describes the light she brings each day, and how she dispels sleep	
79	"Offering of Themis, frankincense"	Themis	One of the Titans, sometimes assimilated with Earth	12	Calls her the first to establish oracular sites and the worship of Bacchus	
80	"Offering of Boreas, frankincense"	Boreas	North wind	6	Describes him as hailing from Thrace	
81	"Offering of Zephyros, frankincense"	Zephyrus	West wind	6	Puts emphasis on the sea	
82	"Offering of Notos, frankincense"	Notus	South wind	7	Asks him to bring clouds which will produce rain	
83	"Offering of Okeanos, spices"	Oceanus	River encircling the world according to Homer	9	Calls him the progenitor of the gods, describes him as encompassing the world	
84	"Offering of Hestia, spices"	Hestia	Goddess of the hearth	8	Contains earth-related phrases which link her with Gaia and Hades	
85	"Offering of Hypnos, with poppy"	Hypnos	Sleep, twin brother of Death in the Iliad	10	Calls him the brother of Death and Oblivion	
86	"Offering of Oneiros, spices"	Oneiros	A "disastrous" Dream (Note: Ricciardelli 2000, p. 533. Ricciardelli states that the hymn's addressee is similar to (though not the same as) the personification of Dream which Zeus sends to Agamemnon in the Iliad.)	18	Depicted as a bringer of revelations during sleep	
87	"Offering of Thanatos, manna"	Thanatos	Death, brother to Sleep and child of Night	12	Asks him for a long life, describes him as dissolving (ἐκλύης) the bonds of life	

== Editions and translations ==
- Taylor, Thomas (1824) [1787], The Mystical Hymns of Orpheus, C. Whittingham, Chiswick. OCLC 913055190. English translation.
- Hermann, Johann Gottfried Jakob (1805), Orphica, Leipzig, C. Fritsch. OCLC 3332126. Internet Archive. Greek edition with Latin critical apparatus.
- Dietsch, David Karl Philipp (1822), Die Hymnen des Orpheus: griechisch und deutsch, Erlangen, Palm und Enke Verlag. OCLC 310526470. German translation with Greek text.
- Abel, Eugenius (1885), Orphica, Leipzig, Sumptibus Fecit G. Freytag. OCLC 983822311. Internet Archive. Greek edition with Latin critical apparatus.
- Plassmann, Joseph Otto (1928), Orpheus: Altgriechische Mysteriengesänge, Jena, Diederichs. OCLC 10027445. German translation.
- Quandt, Wilhelm (1955), Orphei Hymni, Berlin, Weidmann. OCLC 22971774. Greek edition with Latin critical apparatus.
- Charvet, Pascal (1995), La Prière: Les Hymnes d'Orphée, Paris, NiL Éditions. ISBN 2841110265. French translation.
- Athanassakis, Apostolos N. (1977), The Orphic Hymns: Text, Translation, and Notes, Atlanta, Scholars Press. ISBN 0891301194. English translation with Greek text.
- Ricciardelli, Gabriella (2000), Inni Orfici, Milan, Mondadori. ISBN 8804476613. Greek edition with Italian translation.
- Athanassakis, Apostolos N., and Benjamin M. Wolkow (2013), The Orphic Hymns, Baltimore, Johns Hopkins University Press. ISBN 9781421408828. OCLC 799025024. Internet Archive. English translation. A revised edition of Athanassakis's 1977 translation.
- Fayant, Marie-Christine (2014), Hymnes Orphiques, Collection Budé, Paris, Les Belles Lettres. ISBN 9782251005935. Greek edition with French translation.
