= Athos =

Athos may refer to:

== Places ==
- Mount Athos, a mountain in Greece
- Athos Range, a mountain range in Antarctica
- Athos, a village in France, part of the commune Athos-Aspis

== People ==
- Armand d'Athos (1615–1643), Gascon black musketeer of the Maison du Roi in France
- Athos Bulcão (1918–2008), Brazilian painter and sculptor
- Athos Chrysostomou (born 1981), Cypriot football goalkeeper
- Athos de Oliveira (born 1943), Brazilian swimmer
- Athos Dimoulas (1921–1985), Greek poet
- Athos Fava (1925–2016), Argentine communist
- Athos Pisoni (1937–2025), Brazilian sports shooter
- Athos Schwantes (born 1985), Brazilian fencer
- Athos Solomou (born 1985), Cypriot footballer
- Athos Tanzini (1913–2008), Italian fencer
- Athos Valsecchi (1919–1985), Italian politician

== Ships ==
- SS Athos, a 1915 French cargo-passenger ship sunk by a U-boat in World War I
- Athos 1, a tanker from which spilled crude oil into the Delaware River in 2004

== Fictional or mythical characters ==
- Athos (character), one of the title characters in the novel The Three Musketeers (1844) by Alexandre Dumas père
- Athos (mythology), one of the Gigantes in Greek mythology
- Athos Fadigati, the protagonist of the novel The Gold-Rimmed Spectacles (1954) by Giorgio Bassani and of its film adaptation The Gold Rimmed Glasses (1987)
- Athos Magnani, father and son protagonists of Bertolucci's film The Spider's Stratagem (1970)
- Athos Roussos, in the novel Fugitive Pieces (1996) by Anne Michaels
- Athos, in the video game Fire Emblem (2003)

== Arts and entertainment ==
- Athos, a fictional planet in the 1986 science fiction novel Ethan of Athos by Lois McMaster Bujold
- Athos (Stargate), a fictional planet in the TV series Stargate Atlantis
- Athos (album), a 1994 album by Stephan Micus

== See also ==
- Atos (disambiguation)
- Anthos (disambiguation)
