= Argonautica (disambiguation) =

The Argonautica is the title of several epic poems which tell the story of Jason and the Argonauts:

- Argonautica, by Apollonius of Rhodes, a Greek epic poem written in the 3rd century BCE
- Argonautica, by Gaius Valerius Flaccus, a Latin epic poem written shortly after 70 CE.
- Argonautica Orphica, attributed to Orpheus, a Greek epic poem probably written sometime in the 4th through 6th centuries CE
- Argonautica, a fictional cruise ship from the 1998 horror movie Deep Rising
