= Ants (given name) =

Male given name

- Gender: Male
- Language: Estonian
- Name day: 24 June

Origin
- Region of origin: Estonia

Other names
- Related names: Johannes, Hans

Ants is an Estonian masculine given name. Notable people with the name include:

- Ants Antson (1938–2015), Estonian speed skater and Olympic medalist
- Ants Eskola (1908–1989), Estonian actor and singer
- Ants Frosch (born 1959), Estonian politician, diplomat and intelligence officer
- Ants Järvesaar (born 1948), Estonian farmer and politician
- Ants Käärma (born 1942), Estonian agronomist and politician
- Ants Kaljurand (Ants the Terrible; 1917–1951), partisan (Forest Brother)
- Ants Kiviselg (born 1955), Estonian sport physician
- Ants Kurvits (1887–1943), Estonian military commander (major general)
- Ants Laaneots (born 1948), Estonian military general, former Commander-in-Chief of the Estonian Defence Forces
- Ants Laikmaa (1866–1942), Estonian painter
- Ants Lauter (1894–1973), Estonian actor, theatre director and pedagogue
- Ants Leemets (1950–2019), Estonian politician and museum director
- Ants Mängel (born 1987), Estonian badminton player
- Ants Mellik (1926–2005), Estonian architect
- Ants Nuut, Estonian trombonist, vocalist and tuba player for the rock band Apelsin
- Ants Oidermaa (1891–1941), Estonian politician, diplomat and newspaper editor
- Ants Oras (1900–1982), Estonian translator and writer
- Ants Paju (1944–2011), Estonian politician, journalist, athlete and engineer
- Ants Pärna (1935–2014), Estonian maritime historian and poet
- Ants Pauls (born 1940), Estonian politician
- Ants Piip (1884–1942), Estonian lawyer, diplomat and politician
- Ants Soosõrv (born 1969), Estonian renju player and coach
- Ants Soots (born 1956), Estonian conductor
- Ants Tael (1936–2025), Estonian dancer and dance pedagogue
- Ants Tamme (1940–2025), Estonian politician and journalist
- Ants Taul (born 1950), Estonian musician and instrument-maker
- Ants Üleoja (born 1936), Estonian choral conductor and music educator
- Ants Vaino (1940–1971), Estonian racing driver
- Ants Väravas (1937–2018), Estonian cyclist and coach
- Ants Veetõusme (born 1949), Estonian politician and financial and sports figure
- Ants Viires (1918–2015), Estonian ethnologist and historian
- Henn-Ants Kurg (1898–1943), Estonian colonel and diplomat

== See also ==
- Ants (disambiguation)
- Ant (name)
- Antes (name)
