= Mise =

Mise or Miše may refer to:

- Mise (mythology), a deity addressed in the Orphic Hymns
- Ante Miše (born 1967), Croatian footballer
- Jerolim Miše (1890–1970), Croatian painter, teacher, and art critic
- Mapping Imaging Spectrometer for Europa, an imaging spectrometer aboard Europa Clipper
- MISE, an abbreviation for Mean integrated squared error

== See also ==
- Mise en abyme
- Mise en place
- Mise-en-scène
