= Aetos =

Aetos (Greek: Αετός, eagle) may refer to:

== Places ==
- Aetos, Aetolia-Acarnania, a village in Medeon municipality, Aetolia-Acarnania, Greece
- Aetos, Drama, a former village in the Drama regional unit, Greece
- Aetos, Euboea, a village in Karystos municipality, Euboea, Greece
- Aetos, Florina, a municipality in the Florina regional unit, Greece
- Aetos, Messenia, a municipality in Messenia, Greece
- Aetos, Thesprotia, a village in Filiates municipality, Thesprotia, Greece
- Aytos, a municipality in Burgas Province, Bulgaria

== Other uses ==
- Aetos (motorcycle), a pre-World War I Italian bike
- Aetos Security Management, a security company in Singapore
- Aetos Skydra F.C., a football club
- Greek ship Aetos
- Aëtos, figure from Greek mythology

== See also ==
- Antos (name)
