= Prothyraia =

Deity addressed in the Orphic Hymns

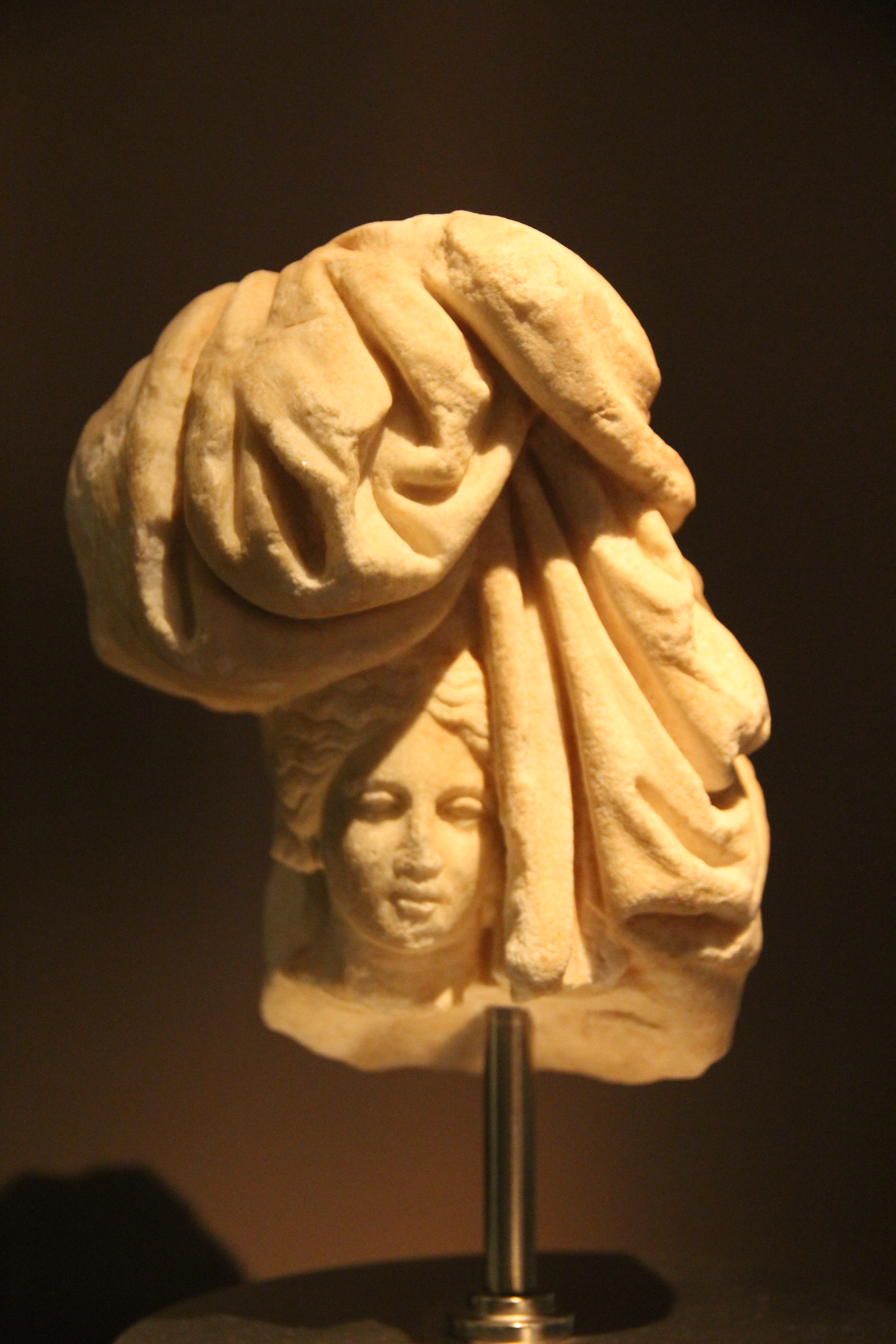
Fragment of a hekataion with the head of Hecate Prothyraia, 4th-century BC, Museum of Cycladic Art, Greece

Prothyraia (Ancient Greek: Προθυραία, romanized: Prothuraía) is the figure addressed in the second of the Orphic Hymns, a collection of ancient Greek hymns composed around the 2nd and 3rd centuries AD.

== Epithet ==
Prothyraia's name means 'at the door' or 'at the door-way', and is used to denote a goddess who presides over the area around the entrance to a building. Prothyraia is an epiclesis of the goddesses Eileithyia, Hecate, and Artemis; Prothyraia is attested as an epithet of Artemis in a 2nd-century AD inscription discovered in Epidaurus. In Pausanias's Description of Greece, there is reference to a temple in Eleusis which was dedicated to Artemis Propylaia. (Note: Ricciardelli, p. 328; Pausanias, 1.38.6 (Jones, pp. 204, 205).)

== Orphic Hymn ==
In line 9 of the Orphic Hymn to Prothyraia, she is addressed as "Eileithyia", and in line 12 she is called "Artemis Eileithyia". The epithets applied to her in the hymn relate primarily to her role in helping with births, and the request of the hymn implores her to aid in giving birth. Two descriptions the hymn applies to her are ōdínōn eparōgós (ὠδίνων ἐπαρωγός), meaning she "who offers support in the pains of childbirth", and ōkýlocheia (ὠϰυλόχεια), meaning she "who accelerates childbirth".

The placement of the hymn to Prothyraia, a figure associated with birth, at the beginning of the collection, is significant, and mirrors the position of the hymn to Thanatos (Death) as the last hymn. According to Fritz Graf, during the rite in which the Orphic Hymns played a role, the hymn to Prothyraia may have been sung as the initiates were entering the building where the rite took place.
