= Hipta =

Goddess from Asia Minor

Hipta (Ancient Greek: Ἵπτα) is an Anatolian goddess attested in inscriptions from the Katakekaumene region of Lydia, and addressed in the forty-ninth of the Orphic Hymns. In the inscriptions which mention her, which date roughly to between the 1st and 3rd centuries AD, she is called "Mother Hipta" and is often mentioned alongside the Phrygian god Sabazios. This epigraphic evidence indicates that Hipta and Sabazios were the subject of worship in the region, and suggests that there existed a sanctuary dedicated to the two gods in the area.

In the Orphic Hymns, she is described as the nurse of Dionysus, who raises him on Mount Tmolus, and as exulting the rites of Sabazios. The hymn addressed to Hipta is also strongly connected with the previous hymn in the collection, which is addressed to Sabazios. The 5th-century AD Neoplatonist Proclus attributes to the mythical poet Orpheus a work titled On Hipta, and relates a story in which Hipta carries the young Dionysus in a líknon, a tale which appears to align with the account given in the Orphic Hymns.

== Name ==
In the inscriptions which mention Hipta, her name is given as Hípta (Ἵπτα) or Heípta (Εἵπτα), names which are non-Greek in origin. In editions of the Orphic Hymns produced prior to the discovery of Hipta's name in epigraphic evidence, her name was rendered as "Hippa" (Ἵππα), a reading of her name recorded in a number of the collection's manuscripts. According to the 5th- or 6th-century AD grammarian Hesychius, the word hípta refers to a bird (perhaps, in particular, woodpeckers), and is also a name for the goddess Hera. (Note: Morand 2001, p. 177; Hesychius, s.v. ἵπτα (Cunningham, p. 473).)

== Lydian inscriptions ==
Hipta is mentioned in four Greek inscriptions from Katakekaumene, a region of Lydia in Asia Minor which sits to the northeast of Mount Tmolus; all four inscriptions were discovered within a radius of twelve kilometres. One such inscription, found in a church in the settlement of Gölde, is a stele which likely dates to the 1st century AD. It refers to "Mother Hipta" (Μητρί Ἵπτα), and mentions the Phrygian god Sabazios; above the inscription is a relief containing objects similar to those which have been found depicted on votive hands to Sabazios. There is only a single known inscription which names Hipta without mentioning Sabazios, which was discovered on an altar in a house from Maionia, and likely dates to the 1st century AD. The remaining two inscriptions are examples of so-called "confession" inscriptions, a group of inscriptions found in the region which date to the 2nd and 3rd centuries AD and contain a guilty confession to the deity they address. (Note: Versnel, p. 75. They typically detail the transgression committed, how the god subsequently enacts physical vengeance upon the individual, and how the god exonerates the individual for their wrongdoing, before supplicating the deity in question.) One of these inscriptions, discovered in Ayazviran, relates the suffering of an individual who stole a slave of Hipta and Sabazios and subsequently received an eye disease. The other "confession" inscription, found in an individual's house in the region, reads as follows: (Note: Morand 2001, pp. 178–179. Both inscriptions relate that the transgressive action is stealing from Hipta and Sabazios, and that the eyes the location in which the perpetrator is made to suffer.)

To Zeus-Sabazios and Mother Hipta
Diocles son of Trophimos.
Because I caught the doves of the gods
I was punished in the eyes and had the
act of divine power inscribed.

These inscriptions evince that Hipta and Sabazios were venerated in cult in the city of Maionia, and seem to indicate that there existed a place of worship dedicated to Hipta and Sabazios in the area, which Anne-France Morand suggests may have been a sacred grove. Given the proximity of the inscriptions to each other, Peter Hermann suggested that they may have originated from a single cult site. The inscriptions address Hipta as "Mother Hipta", pointing strongly to a connection with the Phrygian goddess Cybele. According to Ian Rutherford, Hipta may have been a late form of Ḫepat, a goddess worshipped in Hurrian religion.

== Orphic literature ==
Hipta is addressed in the forty-ninth of the Orphic Hymns, a collection of Greek hymns composed in Asia Minor around the 2nd or 3rd centuries AD. Within the collection, the hymn to Hipta is among the group of hymns which focus on the childhood of Dionysus, with her hymn falling directly behind that to Sabazios. In the hymn to Sabazios, Dionysus is sewed into the thigh of Sabazios-Zeus, and, when he emerges, is given to Hipta, who rears him on Mount Tmolus, a mountain near to where the inscriptions mentioning her were discovered. In Hipta's own hymn, she is similarly described as the nurse of Dionysus, and as:

Celebrating rites and exulting in the mysteries of pure Sabos
And the nocturnal dances of loud Iacchos.

Within this passage, "Sabos" refers to Sabazios. The connection with Cybele may also be present in her Orphic Hymn, where she is addressed, in line 4, as "chthonic mother", and associated with Mount Ida and Mount Tmolus. The strong association of the Orphic Hymn to Hipta with that to Sabazios mirrors their connection in the inscriptions which mention her.

According to the 5th-century AD Neoplatonist Proclus, the mythical poet Orpheus was the author of a work entitled On Hipta. Proclus also relates a tale, in which, after the birth of Dionysus from Zeus's thigh, the young god is given to Hipta, who puts the child in a líknon (λίκνον, a winnowing basket), around which a snake is coiled, which she places on top of her head. The líknon is an object frequently used in Dionysian worship, and is attested in ancient art, and snakes are known to played a role in mysteries of Sabazios. This story appears to be congruent with the description of the Hipta in the Orphic Hymns, and may be illustrated on a vase from the classical period which depicts a female figure presenting to two gods a winnowing basket, the contents of which are covered. According to Rosa García-Gasco, a figure mentioned in Nonnus's Dionysiaca, Mystis, is a name for Hipta, the nurse of Dionysus from Orphic literature.
