= Atos (disambiguation) =

Atos is a French multinational technology company headquartered in Bezons, France.

Atos may also refer to:

- American Theatre Organ Society
- ATOS (Autonomous Decentralized Transport Operation Control System), Japanese computerized control system for train traffic
- Hyundai Atos, a city car produced by the Hyundai Motor Company
- Atos Wirtanen (1906–1979), Ålandic-born former member of the Finnish parliament
- A-I-R Atos, a range of rigid-wings made by A-I-R
- Atos Jiu-Jitsu, a Brazilian jiu-jitsu academy and competition team

== See also ==
- Athos (disambiguation)
- Antos (name)
