= Antis =

Antis may refer to:

- Antis (band), a Lithuanian postmodernist rock band
- Antis (dog), a dog that received the Dickin medal for bravery during World War II
- Antis Township, Blair County, Pennsylvania
- In antis, an architectural term for columns or pillars on the side of a door or window that are not detached from the main structure.

== See also ==
- Antes (name)
- Antos (name)
