= Ante =

Ante may refer to:

- Ante (cards), an initial stake paid in a card game
- Ante (poker), a forced bet in the game of poker
- Ante (name), Croatian form of the given name Anthony
- The Latin word ante, meaning "before", which is used as a prefix in many Latin phrases. e.g. antebellum, meaning "before a war"
- Sivry-Ante, a municipality in the Marne department of France with two villages: Ante and Sivry-Ante

== See also ==
- Antes (disambiguation)
- Anth (disambiguation)
