= Anthos =

Anthos may refer to:

- Anthos (play), a lost play by Athenian dramatist Agathon
- Anthos (restaurant), a former restaurant in New York City
- A spirit god in the fictional comic book series Guardians of the Galaxy
- Anthos, part of Google Cloud Platform
- Rosemary, also called anthos
- Anthos Capital, a Los Angeles-based venture capital firm

== See also ==
- Anthon (given name)
- Athos (disambiguation)
- Antos (name)
