= Aneta Załazińska =

Polish linguist (born 1976)

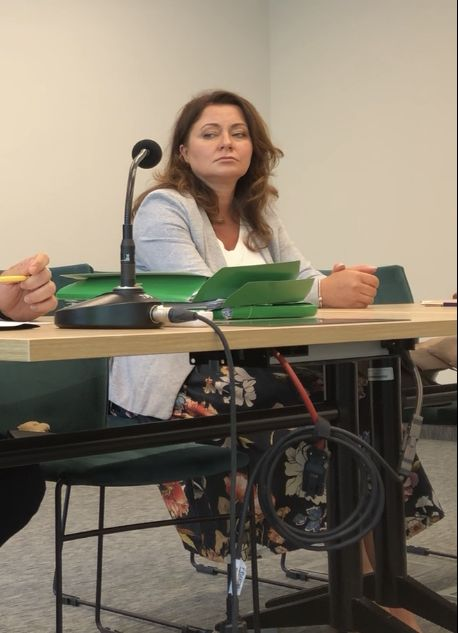
- Aneta Załazińska, 2022
- Born: 1976 (age 49–50)
- Citizenship: Polish
- Education: Jagiellonian University
- Occupation: Linguist
- Employer: Jagiellonian University

Aneta Załazińska (born 1976) is a linguist and professor at the Jagiellonian University.

== Biography ==
In 2000 she graduated with a master's degree in Polish studies from the Jagiellonian University. In 2004 she obtained doctorate upon thesis Niewerbalna struktura dialogu. W poszukiwaniu polskich wzorców narracyjnych i interakcyjnych zachowań komunikacyjnych supervised by Jolanta Antas. In 2016 she obtained habilitation. She was appointed a member of the disciplinary committee for Jagiellonian University students from 2020.

== Books ==
- Schematy myśli wyrażane w gestach. Gesty metaforyczne obrazujące wybrane abstrakcyjne relacje i zasoby podmiotu mówiącego. Kraków: „Universitas”. 2001.
- Retoryka podręczna, czyli jak wnikliwie słuchać i przekonująco mówić. Kraków: Wydawnictwo „Znak”. 2005. Co-authored with Michał Rusinek.
- Niewerbalna struktura dialogu. W poszukiwaniu polskich wzorów narracyjnych i interakcyjnych zachowań komunikacyjnych. Kraków: „Universitas”. 2006.
- Retoryka codzienna. Poradnik nie tylko językowy. Warszawa: Wydawnictwo Czarna Owca. 2010. Co-authored with Michał Rusinek.
- Obraz. Słowo. Gest. Kraków: Wydawnictwo Uniwersytetu Jagiellońskiego. 2016.
- Jak się dogadać czyli retoryka codzienna. Kraków: Wydawnictwo „Znak”. 2018. Co-authored with Michał Rusinek.
