= Altos =

Altos may refer to:

- Altos (Mygdonia), a town of ancient Greece
- Altos (Paraguay)
- Altos, Brazil, a municipality in Piauí
  - Associação Atlética de Altos, a football team in the municipality of Altos
- Altos Computer Systems, an early microcomputer manufacturer

== See also ==
- Antos (name)
- Los Altos (disambiguation)
