= Antes =

Antes may refer to:

- Antes people, inhabiting parts of Eastern Europe in the Early Middle Ages
- Plural of Ante (poker)
- "Antes" (song), 2021 song by Anuel AA
- Antes (surname)

== See also ==
- Henry Antes House, historic house in Upper Frederick Township, Pennsylvania, US
- Fort Antes, stockade in Pennsylvania, US, built by Colonel John Antes c. 1778
- Ante (disambiguation)
- Antos (name)
