= Ants Leemets =

Estonian politician (1950–2019)

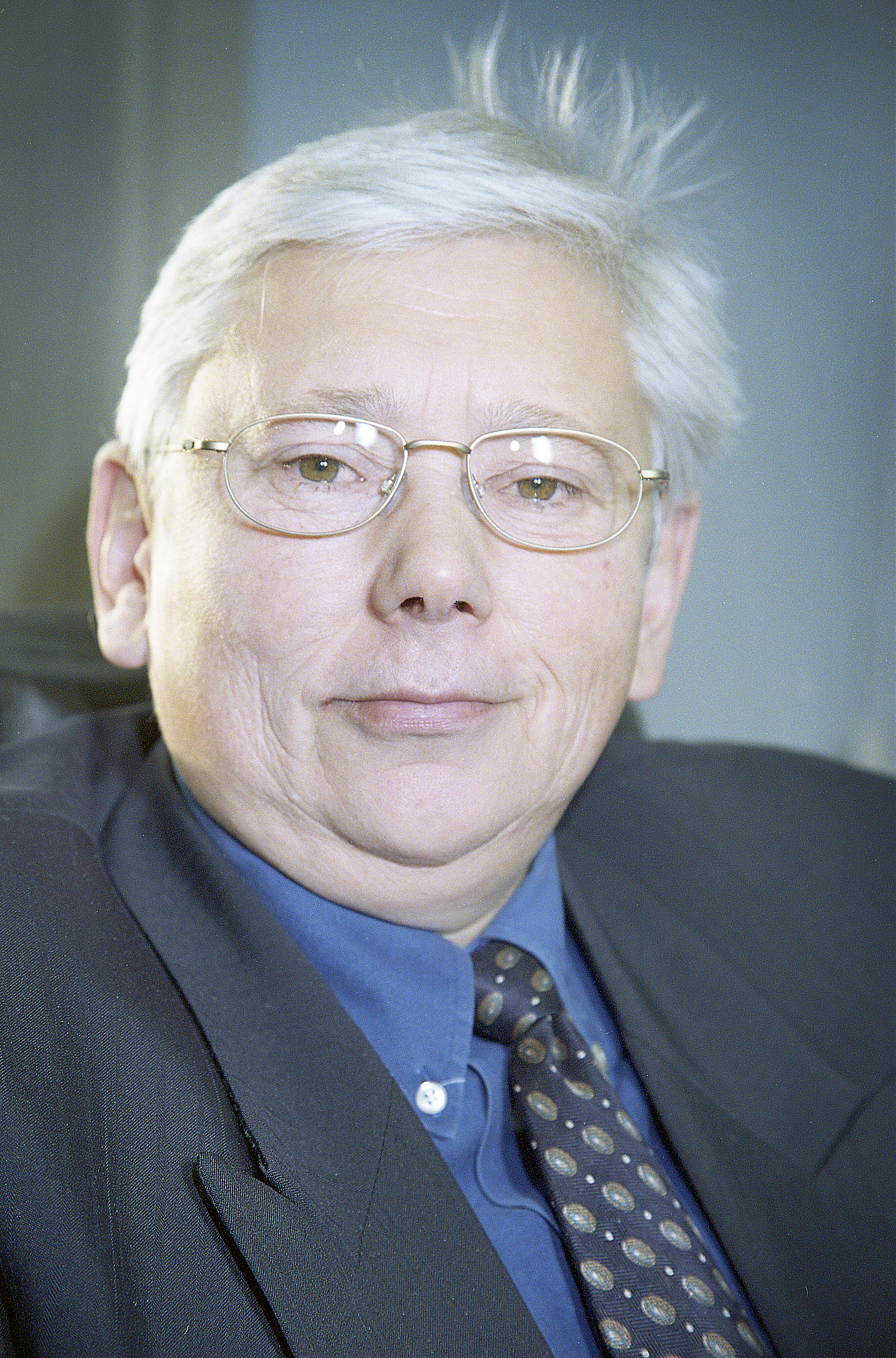
- Born: 23 June 1950; Rakvere, then part of Estonian SSR, Soviet Union
- Died: 23 November 2019 (aged 69)
- Occupations: Politician, museum director
- Years active: 1992–2019

Ants Leemets (23 June 1950 – 23 November 2019) was an Estonian politician and museum director who served as Minister without Portfolio and later as Deputy Mayor of Tallinn.

Leemets was born in Rakvere and graduated in 1968 from Rakvere 1st Secondary School. In 1976 he graduated from the Faculty of Law from University of Tartu.

During the period of 1992–1995, he was the County Governor of Lääne-Viru County, then as Minister without Portfolio (Regional Minister) for several months during the second government of Prime Minister Tiit Vähi in 1995. In 1999, Leemets was an alternate member of the IX Riigikogu. Leemets served as Deputy Mayor of Tallinn in 1996, and again from November 1999 to March 1999, and from November 1999 to March 2001.

From 2002, he had been the head of Virumaa Museums Foundation. He was also the President of the Estonian Association of People with Mobility Disabilities from 2001 until 2013, and honorary member from 2017 until his death. From 2009, he was a member of the Tallinn City Council for the Estonian Reform Party. From 2016, until his death, he was a board member of the Estonian Sports and Olympic Museum in Tartu.

2019, he received the Order of Merit of Tallinn for his many years of service as a member of the Tallinn City Council and as Commissioner for his contribution to the development of Tallinn.
