= Anna Mainardi Fava =

Italian politician (1933–2003)

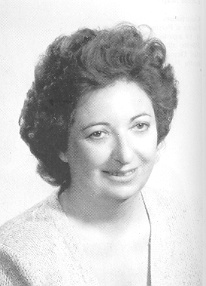

Member of the Chamber of Deputies
- In office 6 July 1983 – 22 April 1992

Personal details
- Born: 10 July 1933 Salsomaggiore Terme, Italy
- Died: 17 March 2003 (aged 69)
- Party: Italian Communist Party; Democratic Party of the Left

Anna Mainardi Fava (10 July 1933 – 17 March 2003) was an Italian politician. She was a member of the Chamber of Deputies from 1983 to 1992, representing the Italian Communist Party and the Democratic Party of the Left.

== Early life ==
Mainardi Fava was born on 10 July 1933, in Salsomaggiore Terme. She served as mayor of Salsomaggiore Terme and then as a member of the regional committee for Fidenza and as a member of the leadership committee for the region. She was a member of the regional and national committee of the Italian Communist Party (PCI).

== Political career ==
She was first elected to the Chamber of Deputies for Parma–Modena–Piacenza–Reggio Calabria in the 1983 general election on 6 July 1983, as a member of the PCI. She was a member of the 14th commission on hygiene and public health. Mainardi Fava was re-elected in the 1987 general election on 25 June 1987. She was a member of the XII commission on social affairs. She was a member for the PCI until the party dissolved when she joined the Democratic Party of the Left (PDS) on 13 February 1991. She left office on 22 April 1992.
