= Antes (name) =

Antes is a Germanic surname. Notable people with this name include the following:

== Surname ==
- Henry Antes (1701–1755), Bavarian religious/political leader
- Hilda Antes (1929 – 2016), German sprinter
- Horst Antes (born 1936), German sculptor
- John Antes (1740–1811), American composer
- Lissette Antes, birth name Lissette Alexandra Antes Castillo (born 1991), Ecuadorian wrestler

== Middle name ==
- John Antes Latrobe (1799–1878), English cleric and writer

== See also ==
- Andes (disambiguation)
- Antas (disambiguation)
- Ante (name)
- Antes (disambiguation)
- Antis (disambiguation)
- Antos (name)
- Ants (given name)
