= Orphic Argonautica =

Greek epic poem

The Orphic Argonautica or Argonautica Orphica (Ancient Greek: Ὀρφέως Ἀργοναυτικά) is a Greek epic poem dating from the 4th century CE. It is narrated in the first person in the name of Orpheus, one of the Argonauts, and tells the story of Jason and the Argonauts. It is not known who the real author is. The poem is found in manuscripts either on its own or together with the Orphic Hymns and other hymns such as the Homeric Hymns and those of Proclus and Callimachus. The poem was lost, but in the fifteenth century it was found and copied in a manuscript (Codex Matritensis gr. 4562) by the Neoplatonic Greek scholar Constantine Lascaris. Another related work is the Lithica (describing the properties and symbolism of different stones).

The narrative is basically similar to that in other versions of the story, such as the Argonautica of Apollonius Rhodius, on which it is probably based. The main differences are the emphasis on the role of Orpheus and a more mythological, less realistic technique of narration. In the Argonautica Orphica, unlike in Apollonius Rhodius, it is claimed that the Argo was the first ship ever built.

== Translations and editions ==
- Madeła, Alexandra Maria (2024). The Argonautika by Orpheus: Writing Pre-Homeric Poetry in Late Antiquity. Brill. ISBN 978-90-04-71568-4.
- Les argonautiques orphiques, ed. Francis Vian (Collection des universités de France), Belles Lettres 2003, ISBN 2-251-00389-4, ISBN 978-2-251-00389-4 (Greek with French translation)
- Johann Matthias Gesner, Orphic Argonautica in Argonautica, Hymni Libellus de lapidibus et fragmenta cum notis, Leipzig, Sumtibus Caspari Fritsch, 1764. Internet Archive. (Greek text with Latin translation)
