= Antas, Bahia =

Municipality of Bahia, Brazil

Coordinates: 10°24′00″S 38°19′58″W

- Municipality
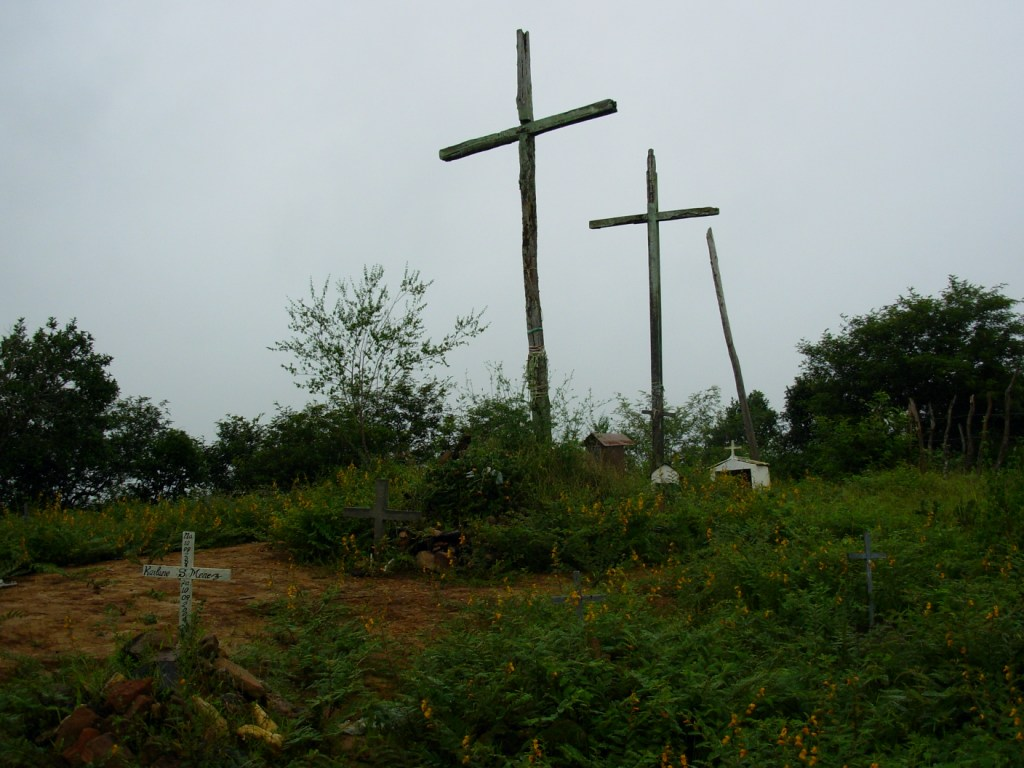

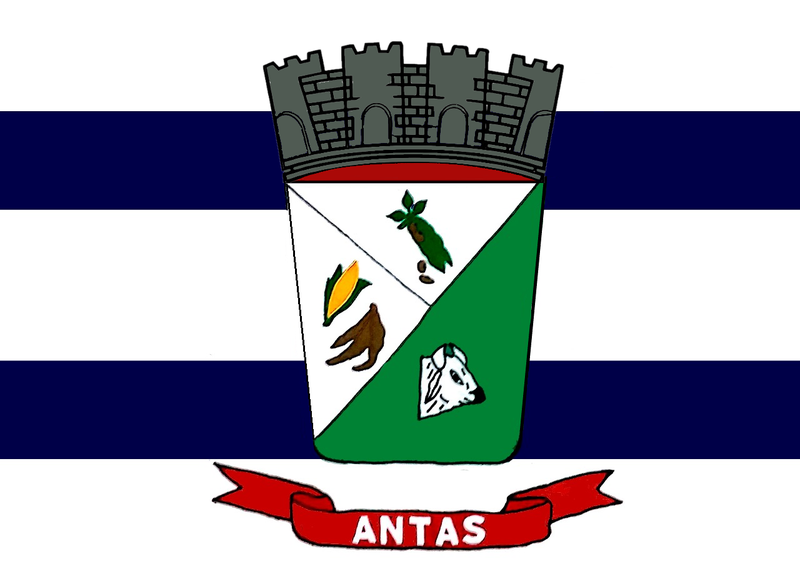
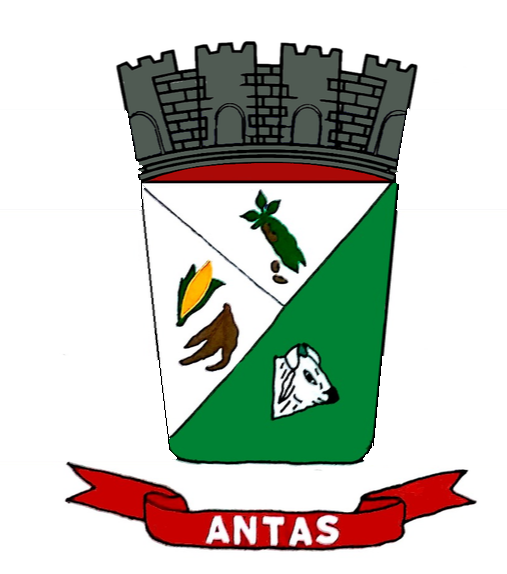
- Flag Coat of arms
- Interactive map of Antas, Bahia
- Country: Brazil
- Region: Nordeste
- State: Bahia

Population (2020)
  - Total: 19,479
- Time zone: UTC−3 (BRT)

Antas, Bahia is a municipality in the state of Bahia in the North-East region of Brazil.

== See also ==
- List of municipalities in Bahia
