= Giovanni Fava (psychiatrist) =

Italian psychiatrist

Giovanni Andrea Fava (born 10 June 1952 in Valdagno, Italy) is an Italian psychiatrist and academic, known for his research on the treatment of affective disorders, psychosomatic medicine, and the adverse effects of antidepressant drugs. He is a professor at the Alma Mater Studiorum – University of Bologna and a clinical professor of psychiatry at the University at Buffalo School of Medicine and Biomedical Sciences. He is the originator of Well-Being Therapy and of the sequential model for combining pharmacotherapy and psychotherapy in the treatment of depression.

== Education and early career ==
Fava received his medical degree from the University of Padova in 1977, completing electives at McMaster University, the University of Rochester (with George L. Engel), and Dartmouth Medical School (with Zbigniew J. Lipowski). He completed his residency training in psychiatry at the University of Padova in 1981.

After qualifying, he worked for several years in the United States, holding positions in Albuquerque, New Mexico, and Buffalo, New York, including appointments at the University of New Mexico School of Medicine and the State University of New York at Buffalo. From 1992 to 2022, he was the editor-in-chief of the peer-reviewed medical journal Psychotherapy and Psychosomatics.

=== Academic appointments ===
Fava returned to Italy in 1988, where he established an Affective Disorders Program in the Department of Psychology of the University of Bologna. He served first as Associate Professor of Psychosomatic Medicine and subsequently as Professor of Clinical Psychology at Bologna until the end of 2018, when he became a professor at the Alma Mater Studiorum, University of Bologna. Throughout this period he maintained his affiliation with the State University of New York at Buffalo, where he has been Clinical Professor of Psychiatry at the School of Medicine and Biomedical Sciences since 1997.

== Research ==
Fava has authored more than 700 scientific publications, with research focusing primarily on affective disorders, psychosomatic medicine, and clinical assessment.

Fava developed Well-Being Therapy, a short-term psychotherapeutic approach focused on psychological well-being and relapse prevention in depression. He also proposed a sequential treatment model combining pharmacotherapy and psychotherapy at different stages of treatment.

Fava is known for his research on the adverse effects of antidepressant drugs, including their potential to trigger withdrawal syndromes and relapse among depressed patients. In a 1994 editorial he argued that many of his fellow psychiatrists were too hesitant to question whether a given psychiatric treatment might be more harmful than helpful. He introduced the concept of "oppositional tolerance", which proposes that prolonged antidepressant exposure may contribute to worsening symptoms in some patients.

Fava contributed to the development of clinimetrics, expanding its application to psychiatric assessment. He also introduced the use of staging to describe the longitudinal development of psychiatric disorders.

In 1995 Fava led an international group of investigators who introduced the Diagnostic Criteria for Psychosomatic Research (DCPR), a system for classifying psychosomatic distress that is not included in standard psychiatric assessment.

== Recognition ==
Fava's h-index is in the eighties, with more than 25,000 citations recorded in the Web of Science. He has been included in the Clarivate list of the most influential scientists in the fields of psychiatry and psychology. He has also been President of the International College of Psychosomatic Medicine (2007-2009).

He is the founder and President of the Academy of Well-Being Therapy.

== Selected books ==
- Well-Being Therapy: Treatment Manual and Clinical Applications. Basel: Karger, 2016.
- Discontinuing Antidepressant Medications. Oxford: Oxford University Press, 2021.
- Clinical Judgment in Psychiatry: The Foundation of Optimal Treatment. Oxford: Oxford University Press, 2025.
