= Antos Gémes =

Hungarian theater and film actor

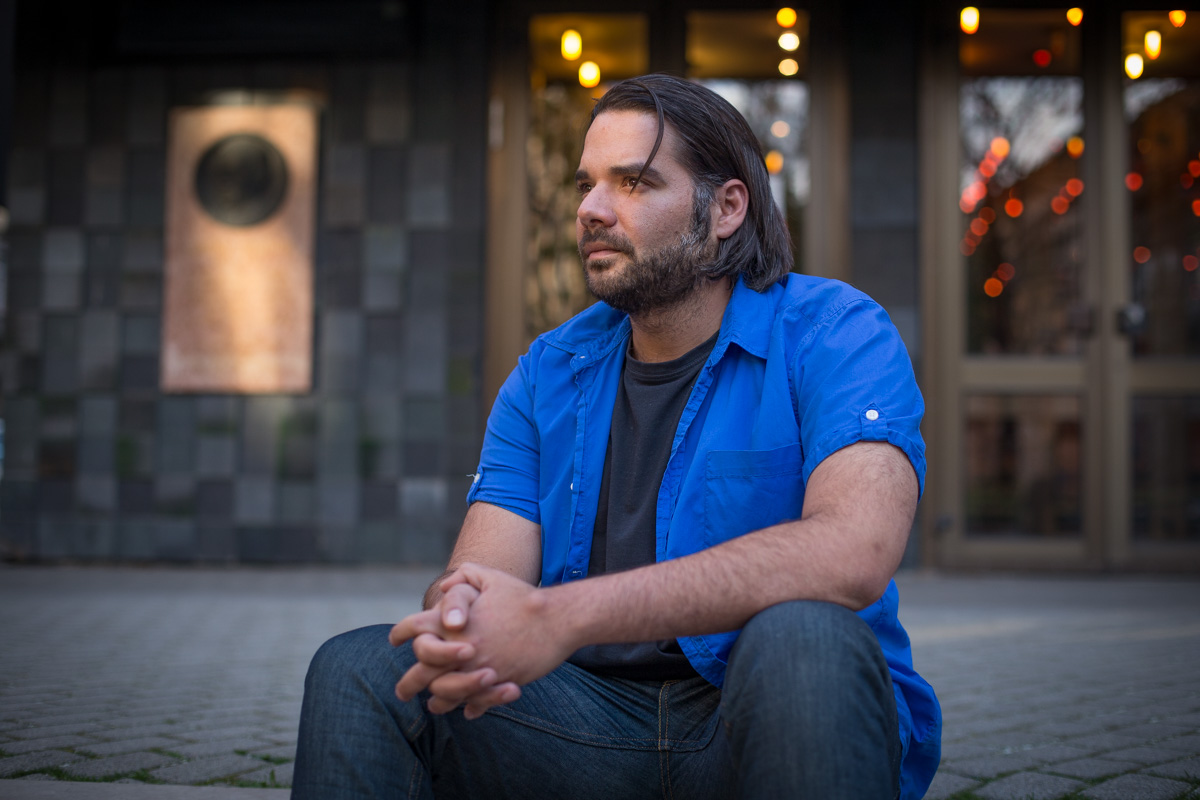
- Antos Gémes by the Magyar Theatre Photo by Gergely Vas (2015)
- Born: 29 April 1981 (age 44); Budapest, Hungary
- Occupation: Actor
- Years active: 2001–present

Antos Gémes (born 29 April 1981, in Budapest) is a Hungarian actor who is a member of the Magyar Theatre.

== Career ==
Antos Gémes was born on 29 April 1981, in Budapest.

He graduated in Leövey Klára music-time High School in 1999. During his high school years, he studied to be a composer. He plays several instruments, like guitar, piano and wind instruments. After his graduation, he tried many types of theatrical forms. For years he worked at Red Nose Clown Doctors Foundation in the role of Dr. Monokli.

He studied puppet acting at Academy of Drama and Film in Budapest from 2004 to 2008 as János Meczner's student. In the last year of his study, he became a scholar member from the Hungarian Actors Union of Magyar Theatre. Since 2010, he has been teaching acting at the school of the theatre.

Even during his academic years, he already had a music band, but in 2009 he founded Harmadik Figyelmeztetés (Third Calling) band where he is the singer. Besides his work in theatres he has been playing in several films and series. He was also featuring in a music clip and viral video series of Compact Disco. He was the protagonist of their clip.

== Selected theater roles ==
- Áron Tamási: Ábel - Ábel
- W. S. Gilbert: The Mikado - Pish-Tush
- Bertolt Brecht: The Good Person of Szechwan - Yang Sun
- Edmond Rostand: Cyrano de Bergerac - Christian
- Cy Coleman: Sweet Charity - Oscar Lindquist
- John Ford: 'Tis Pity She's a Whore - Bergetto
- Terje Nordby: Isblomst - Andreas
- Stephen Sondheim, James Lapine: Into the Woods - The Baker

== Selected filmography ==
- 2012, Marslakók (TV Series) - Óbester Antos
- 2013, Indián (film) - Lantos Tamás

== Sources ==
- Magyar Theatre - Gémes Antos
- Antos Gémes http://topmovies.se/
- Hungarian Theater Database
- This article contains a translation of Gémes Antos from hu.Wikipedia.
