= Mise (mythology) =

Goddess from Asia Minor

Mise or Misé (Ancient Greek: Μίση, romanized: Mísē) is an Anatolian goddess addressed in one of the Orphic Hymns. She is first mentioned in a mime by the Greek poet Herodas, which references a "Descent of Mise". In the Orphic Hymn addressed to her, she is identified with Dionysus, and depicted as a female version of the god. She is also named in two inscriptions discovered around the city of Pergamon in Asia Minor, which indicate that there existed a local cult to her in the area.

== Greek literature ==
The earliest mention of Mise comes from a mime by the Greek poet Herodas (which dates to the 3rd century BC). (Note: Ricciardelli, p. 398. For this dating, see Heinze, para. 1.) One of the characters in the work, Gryllos, is said to have become infatuated with a woman, Metriche, while they were at the "Descent of Mise". (Note: Morand 2001, p. 172; Herodas, Mimiamb 1.56 (Zanker, pp. 16, 17).) This "descent", or káthodos (κάθοδος), appears to reflect a real-world cult practice, and is suggestive of a katabasis (a descent to the Greek underworld). According to Graham Zanker, Mise's descent seems to have been a "copy" of the katabasis of Kore. The events of the mime are likely set on Kos or Cyprus, though other locations are possible, with the exception of Egypt, which is excluded by the mime itself.

Mise is addressed in the forty-second of the Orphic Hymns, a collection of ancient Greek hymns composed in Asia Minor around the 2nd to 3rd centuries AD. The hymn, which is part of the group of hymns in the collection related to Dionysus, identifies her with Dionysus, and depicts her as a female version of the god; the hymn also portrays her as being dual-natured, calling her "masculine and feminine". She is described as the daughter of the Egyptian goddess Isis, who is mentioned by Plutarch as the mother of Dionysus.

The few other references to Mise in literature provide an unclear picture of her. According to Harpocration, the 4th-century BC mythographer Asclepiades of Tragilus considered Dysaules, an autochthon of Eleusis, to be the father, by Baubo, of Protonoe and Nisa (Νίση); the name of latter of these figures was emended to "Mise" by Karl Müller, a reading which has been largely accepted by subsequent scholars. The Greek writer Antoninus Liberalis (who likely dates to around the 2nd and 3rd centuries AD) relates a tale about a figure named Misme (Μίσμη), who may be the same as Mise, in which she takes in a thirsty Demeter and gives her a drink; Misme's son, Ascalabus, bursts into laughter at Demeter's drinking, and is turned by the goddess into a lizard. (Note: Morand 2001, p. 173; Antoninus Liberalis, 24 (Papathomopoulos, p. 42).) According to the 5th- or 6th-century AD grammarian Hesychius, Mise is associated with the Mother goddess and her name is used in oaths. (Note: Morand 2001, p. 173; Ricciardelli, p. 399; Hesychius, s.v. [Μισατίς] Μίση (Cunningham, p. 839).)

== Anatolian inscriptions ==
Mise's name has been found in two inscriptions from Asia Minor. One of these inscriptions, discovered during late-19th-century excavations of the city of Pergamon, was found in the sanctuary of Demeter in the city, and likely dates to the 2nd century BC. The inscription, which consists of the word ΜΙΣΗΙ, was likely originally inscribed on an altar dedicated to the goddess. The other inscription, the date of which is unknown, was discovered on an altar found near to Pergamon, which probably originated from or very close to the city. The text of the inscriptions specifies that the altar was dedicated to "Mise Kore" by a priestess named Ánthis (Ἄνθις). On the altar pieces of wheat are pictured, which, according to Anne-France Morand, mirror her connection with Demeter in the Orphic Hymns; Morand also views the altar as comporting with the "Eleusinian atmosphere" of the hymn to Mise. The existence of an altar dedicated to Mise indicates that she was worshipped in the region, with the two inscriptions pointing towards her having been the subject of a cult which existed in the immediate vicinity of Pergamon.
