= Jolanta Antas =

Polish professor of linguistics

Jolanta Antas (born 20 February 1954 in Szczecin) is a Polish professor of linguistics at the Jagiellonian University of Kraków.

Antas is the head of the Institute of Theory of Communication at the Faculty of Polish Language and Literature of the Jagiellonian University. She conducts research on pragmatic and semantic aspects of negation and lying. With a team of associates, she has drafted a scientific study called “The map of Polish expressions”.

Her doctoral students include Aneta Załazińska.

== On Lies and Lying ==
From September 1980 to 1989, Antas was a part of the Solidarity independent publishing movement. She was the author of articles, the editor and reviewer of texts, in "Hutniku" and "Małopolska monthly".

Antas published two monographs on lying and negation called: O mechanizmach negowania (Kraków 1991), and O kłamstwie i kłamaniu (Kraków 1999). O kłamstwie i kłamaniu (On Lies and Lying) is notably the first Polish book devoted entirely to the phenomenon of lying in the process of verbal communication. The subject is closely related to both logic and philosophy from within the realm of linguistics. The human strategies discussed include partial judgments, false conclusions, misleading silence, secrets, half-truths, compliments, white lies and nonverbal lies.

She appeared at the GESPIN 2009 "Gesture and Speech in Interaction" conference.

== See also ==
- List of Poles, Linguistics
- Theoretical linguistics
