= Greek ship Aetos =

At least two ships of the Hellenic Navy have borne the name Aetos (Greek: Αετός, "eagle"):

- Greek destroyer Aetos (1912), an Aetos-class destroyer, was acquired in 1912 and decommissioned in 1945.
- Greek destroyer Aetos (D01), a Cannon-class destroyer escort, was launched in 1944 as USS Slater; she was transferred to Greece in 1951 and renamed. She was decommissioned in 1991 and is preserved as a museum ship in the United States.
