= Ants Tamme =

Estonian politician and journalist

Ants Tamme (20 April 1940 – 12 April 2025) was an Estonian politician and journalist. He was an alternate member of VIII Riigikogu, representing the Estonian Party of Pensioners and Families (Eesti Pensionäride ja Perede Erakond).

He was born in Lelle Rural Municipality (now Kehtna Parish, Pärnu County (now Rapla County). He graduated from Tallinn Pedagogical University in 1966, and has worked as an Estonian language and literature teacher.
