= Antaea =

Epithet of Demeter, Rhea and Cybele

In Greek mythology, Antaea (Ancient Greek: Ἀνταία), Antaia, or Antea, was an epithet of the goddesses Demeter, Rhea, and Cybele. Its meaning is unclear but it probably signifies a goddess whom man may approach in prayers, this name looks like "ain tinea" the berbere queen of Algerian desert (Tin Hinan). It may also have to do with Cybele's hostility to the Telchines.

"Antaea" was also another name for Stheneboea, wife of Proetus.
