= Athos Fava =

Argentine politician

Athos Fava (1925-2016) was an Argentine communist. He was the General Secretary of the Communist Party of Argentina from 1980 to 1989, and the head of international relations for the party.

Fava authored works such as Memoria Militante (Militant Memory), Que es el Partido Comunista (What is the Communist Party?) and Reflexiones de un dirigente comunista (Reflections of a Communist Leader).
