= Anti (given name) =

Estonian male given name

- Gender: Male
- Language: Estonian
- Name day: 30 November

Origin
- Region of origin: Estonia

Other names
- Related names: Antti, Andres, Andreas, Andrus, Anto

Anti is an Estonian masculine given name. It is a cognate of the Finnish masculine given name Antti. As of 1 January 2020, there are 854 men in Estonia named Anti. Anti is the 192nd most popular male name in the country.

Individuals bearing the name Anti include:

- Anti Allas (born 1977), Estonian politician
- Anti Kuus (born 1956), Estonian economist, entrepreneur, photographer and singer-songwriter
- Anti Liiv (born 1946), Estonian psychiatrist, psychologist and politician
- Anti Poolamets (born 1971), Estonian historian, lawyer and politician
- Anti Saar (born 1980), Estonian children’s writer and translator
- Anti Saarepuu (born 1983), Estonian cross-country skier
- Anti Selart (born 1973), Estonian historian
- Anti Tammeoks (born 1975), Estonian politician
