= Atto =

Atto may refer to:

== People ==
=== Given name ===
- Atto (archbishop of Milan) (died 1080? or after 1085?)
- Atto (bishop of Vic) (died 971)
- Atto of Pistoia (1070–1153), Italian prelate
- Atto of Spoleto, Duke of Spoleto from 653 to 663
- Atto of Vercelli (885–961), Bishop of Vercelli
- Atto Melani (born 1626–1714), Italian opera singer
- Atto Mensah (born 1964), Sierra Leonean football player and coach
- Atto Tigri (1813–1875), Italian anatomist

=== Surname ===
- Osman Ali Atto (1940–2013), Somali warlord

== Other uses ==
- Amazon Tall Tower Observatory, a scientific research facility in the Amazon rainforest of Brazil
- atto-, a metric prefix denoting a factor of 10^{−18}
- ATTO Technology, a computer electronics manufacturer
- Atto I, 1975 album by Al Bano and Romina Power
- BYD Atto, an automobile nameplate

== See also ==
- Antto (disambiguation)
