= Andrus (given name) =

Estonian male given name

- Gender: Male
- Language: Estonian
- Name day: 30 November

Origin
- Region of origin: Estonia

Other names
- Related names: Andres, Andreas

Andrus is an Estonian masculine given name.

People named Andrus include:

- Andrus Ansip (born 1956), Estonian politician
- Andrus Aug (born 1972), Estonian road bicycle racer
- Andrus Eelmäe (born 1956), Estonian actor
- Andrus Johani (1906–1941), Estonian painter
- Andrus Kajak (born 1965), Estonian fencer
- Andrus Kivirähk (born 1970), Estonian writer
- Andrus Merilo (born 1973), Estonian general
- Andrus Murumets (born 1978), Estonian strongman
- Andrus Öövel (born 1957), Estonian rower and politician
- Andrus Paul (born 1975), Estonian luger
- Andrus Poksi (born 1968), Estonian sport sailor and sailing coach
- Andrus Raadik (born 1986), Estonian volleyball player
- Andrus Rõuk (born 1957), Estonian artist and poet
- Andrus Saar (1946–2015), Estonian sociologist and media scholar
- Andrus Saare (born 1965), Estonian politician
- Andrus Saareste (1892–1964), Estonian linguist and dialectologist
- Andrus Seeme (born 1969), Estonian politician
- Andrus Utsar (born 1976), Estonian weightlifter
- Andrus Vaarik (born 1958), Estonian actor and theatre director
- Andrus Värnik (born 1977), Estonian javelin thrower
- Andrus Veerpalu (born 1971), Estonian skier
