= Momofuku =

Momofuku may refer to:

- Momofuku Ando (1910–2007), Taiwanese-Japanese businessman who founded Nissin Food Products and invented instant noodles

Momofuku may also refer to the following, which are all named after Ando:

- Momofuku (album) by Elvis Costello
- By chef David Chang:
  - Momofuku (restaurants)
  - Momofuku (cookbook)

== See also ==
- Momofuku Ando Instant Ramen Museum, an instant noodle museum
