= Eelmäe =

Estonian family name

Origin
- Language: Estonian
- Meaning: "fore hill/mountain"
- Region of origin: Estonia

Eelmäe is an Estonian surname meaning "fore hill/mountain"; a compound of eel (fore, in front of) and mäe (hill/mountain).

As of 1 January 2021, 50 men and 63 women in Estonia have the surname Eelmäe. Eelmäe is ranked as the 2078th most common surname for men in Estonia, and 1734th for women. The surname Eelmäe is most common in Põlva County, where 2.83 per 10,000 inhabitants of the county bear the surname.

Notable people bearing the surname Eelmäe include:

- Andrus Eelmäe (born 1956), Estonian actor
- August Eelmäe (1931–2020), Estonian literary scholar and critic
- Lembit Eelmäe (1927–2009), Estonian actor
- Urmas Eelmäe (born 1964), Estonian historian
