= ANH =

ANH may refer to:

- Alajnihah Airways (ICAO airline code "ANH")
- Atrial natriuretic hormone or atrial natriuretic peptide
- Alliance for Natural Health, UK
- Akita Northern Happinets, a Japanese basketball team
- A New Hope, or Star Wars: Episode IV – A New Hope, the first released Star Wars film

== See also ==
- Anh. (disambiguation)
- Anth (disambiguation)
