= Ankh (disambiguation) =

The Ankh is the Egyptian hieroglyphic character ☥, meaning "life".

Ankh may also refer to:

== People ==
- Ankh-ef-en-Khonsu i, an Ancient Egyptian priest of the god Mentu
- Ankh Warrior, a persona of Vinnie Vincent in the band KISS

== Art, entertainment, and media ==
=== Fictional entities ===
- Ankh, a character in Kamen Rider OOO
- Ankh-Morpork, a city in the Discworld novels of Terry Pratchett

=== Films ===
- Ankh Ka Tara, a 1978 Bollywood film

=== Games ===
- Ankh, a series of computer adventure games:
  - Ankh (video game) (2005)
  - Ankh: Heart of Osiris (2006)
  - Ankh: Battle of the Gods (2007)
- Adventurers of the North - Kalevala Heroes (ANKH), a Finnish role-playing game

== Other uses ==
- ANKH, a protein
- Ankh wedja seneb, an Ancient Egyptian phrase

== See also ==
- Anth (disambiguation)
- Aankhen (disambiguation)
- Akh, soul in ancient Egyptian
