= Anto (name) =

- Gender: Male

Origin
- Meaning: Anthony

Other names
- See also: Ando, Anti

Anto may either be a surname or given name. It is a Slavic name and a Croatian form of Anton, Antonio and Antonijo that is used in Croatia and various Slavic and Balkan cultures. It is also a given name that is used in Italy, Bosnia and Estonia.

== Given name ==
- Anto Đapić (born 1958), Croatian politician
- Anto Drobnjak (born 1968), Montenegrin football player
- Anto Grabo (born 1960), Bosnian football player
- Anto Gvozdenović (1853–1935), Montenegrin military commander, politician and diplomat
- Anto Jakovljević (1962–2025), Croatian football player
- Anto Kovačević (1952–2020), Croatian politician
- M. Anto Peter (1967–2012), computer scientist and technical writer
- Anto Raukas (1935–2021), Estonian geologist
- Anto Saka (born 2004), American football player
- Anthony "Anto" Thistlethwaite (born 1955), British musician
- Anto Kankaras, fictional character from Far Cry

== Surname ==
- Rino Anto (born 1988), footballer

== See also ==
- Anto (disambiguation)
- Ant (name)
- Antão, name
- Anth (name)
- Antto (disambiguation)
