= ATH =

Ath is a city in Belgium.

The acronym or initials ATH may also refer to:

- Athens International Airport, Greece, IATA code
- Atherstone railway station, UK, National Rail code
- Anti-tank helicopter, type of military helicopter
- Around the Horn, an ESPN Television Show
- Absolute threshold of hearing
- ATH (interbank network), Puerto Rico and the Caribbean
- A Toda Hora, a Colombian interbank network
- The Hayes command set for modems "hang up" command
- University of Bielsko-Biała (Polish: Akademia Techniczno-Humanistyczna w Bielsku-Białej or "ATH" in its logo and web site)
- Athabaskan languages (ISO 639-2 and ISO 639-5 codes)
- The abbreviation for the Athletics baseball team, formerly known as the Oakland Athletics (OAK)
- IOC sport code for athletics at the Summer Olympics

== See also ==
- Anth (disambiguation)
