= Anth (disambiguation) =

Anth may refer to the following:

- Anth, short for Anth: A Dream for a Better Tomorrow, 1994 Indian action film
- ANTH domain, protein domain
- Anth (name)

== See also ==
- ANH (disambiguation)
- Ankh (disambiguation)
- Ant (disambiguation)
- Anta (disambiguation)
- Ante (disambiguation)
- Anti (disambiguation)
- ANTM (disambiguation)
- Anto (disambiguation)
- Arth (disambiguation)
- Ath (disambiguation)
- NTH (disambiguation)
