= Eat a Peach (disambiguation) =

Eat a Peach is a 1972 album by the Allman Brothers Band.

Eat a Peach may also refer to:

- Eat a Peach (autobiography), a 2020 book by American chef David Chang
- "Eat a Peach" (Space Ghost Coast to Coast), an episode from the eighth season of the animated series
- "Eat a Peach", an episode from the fifth season of the television series Six Feet Under

== See also ==
- Eat the Peach, a 1986 Irish comedy film
