= Anto =

Anto or Antos may refer to:

- Anto (name), including a list of people with the surname or given name
- Antos (name), including a list of people with the surname or given name
- Anto (restaurant), a Korean steakhouse in Manhattan
- Antofagasta PLC, stock symbol ANTO
- Antăș (Hungarian: Antos), a village in Romania

== See also ==
- Anth (disambiguation)
