= Chrissy Teigen =

American model (born 1985)

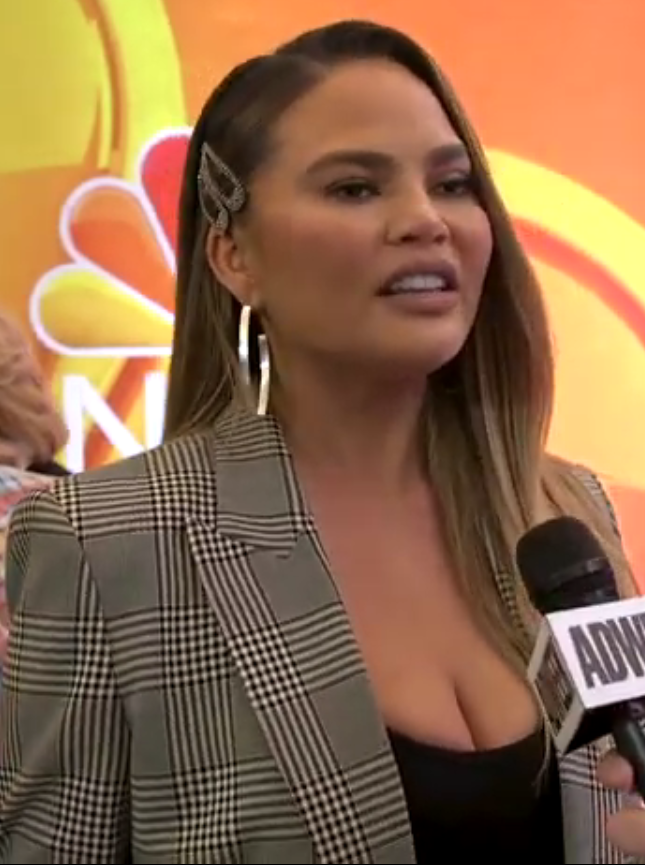
- Teigen in 2019
- Born: Christine Diane Teigen; November 30, 1985 (age 40); Delta, Utah, U.S.
- Occupations: Model; television personality; producer; author
- Years active: 2006–present
- Political party: Democratic
- Spouse: John Legend (m. 2013)
- Children: 4
- Modeling information
- Agency: IMG Models (Worldwide)

Christine Diane Teigen (born November 30, 1985) is an American model, television personality, and author. She made her professional modeling debut in the annual Sports Illustrated Swimsuit Issue, in 2010, and appeared on the 50th-anniversary cover alongside Nina Agdal and Lily Aldridge, in 2014.

Teigen formerly appeared as a panelist on the syndicated daytime talk show FABLife (2015–2016). She co-hosted the musical competition show Lip Sync Battle (2015–2019) with LL Cool J and was a judge on the comedy competition show Bring the Funny (2019). She co-hosted the comedic court show Chrissy's Court (2020–2022) with her mother. Teigen has also authored three cookbooks.

== Early life ==
Christine Diane Teigen was born on November 30, 1985, in Delta, Utah, the daughter of Vilailuck Chaiudom (nicknamed "Pepper") and Ronald Leroy "Ron" Teigen. She is of Thai descent through her mother who hails from Nakhon Ratchasima in the northeastern region of Isan, Thailand, and of Norwegian, German and Sinti descent through her father. Her surname is usually pronounced /ˈtiːɡən/; despite this, she stated that she prefers the pronunciation /ˈtaɪɡən/. Teigen discovered on Finding Your Roots that her distant cousins, who were Roma, were killed in the Holocaust in Auschwitz.

After Teigen was born, she and her family relocated to Snohomish, Washington, where her parents ran a tavern. Her parents separated when she was 15, and she moved to Huntington Beach, California with her father and sister, while her mother returned to Thailand. While living in Huntington Beach, Teigen worked at a surf shop, where she landed a modeling campaign with clothing company Billabong through the shop's clients, and was discovered by a photographer. In her early modeling career, Teigen lived in Miami, Florida "for four years, six months out of the year". Teigen's parents officially divorced in May 2020.

== Career ==
Teigen was a briefcase model on the game show Deal or No Deal during the pilot and first season. She would return to the Deal or No Deal franchise in 2025, as the mysterious banker on the second season of Deal or No Deal Island.

She appeared in the Sports Illustrated swimsuit issue, in 2010, and was named "Rookie of the Year". Her friend and fellow model Brooklyn Decker had introduced her to the people at Sports Illustrated to cast her. The following year, she designed and debuted a capsule collection, with swimwear designer DiNeila Brazil, at Mercedes-Benz Fashion Week Swim in Miami, as well as appearing as a featured character in the 2011 Electronic Arts video game Need for Speed: The Run. She also filmed a Cooking Channel special titled Cookies and Cocktails.

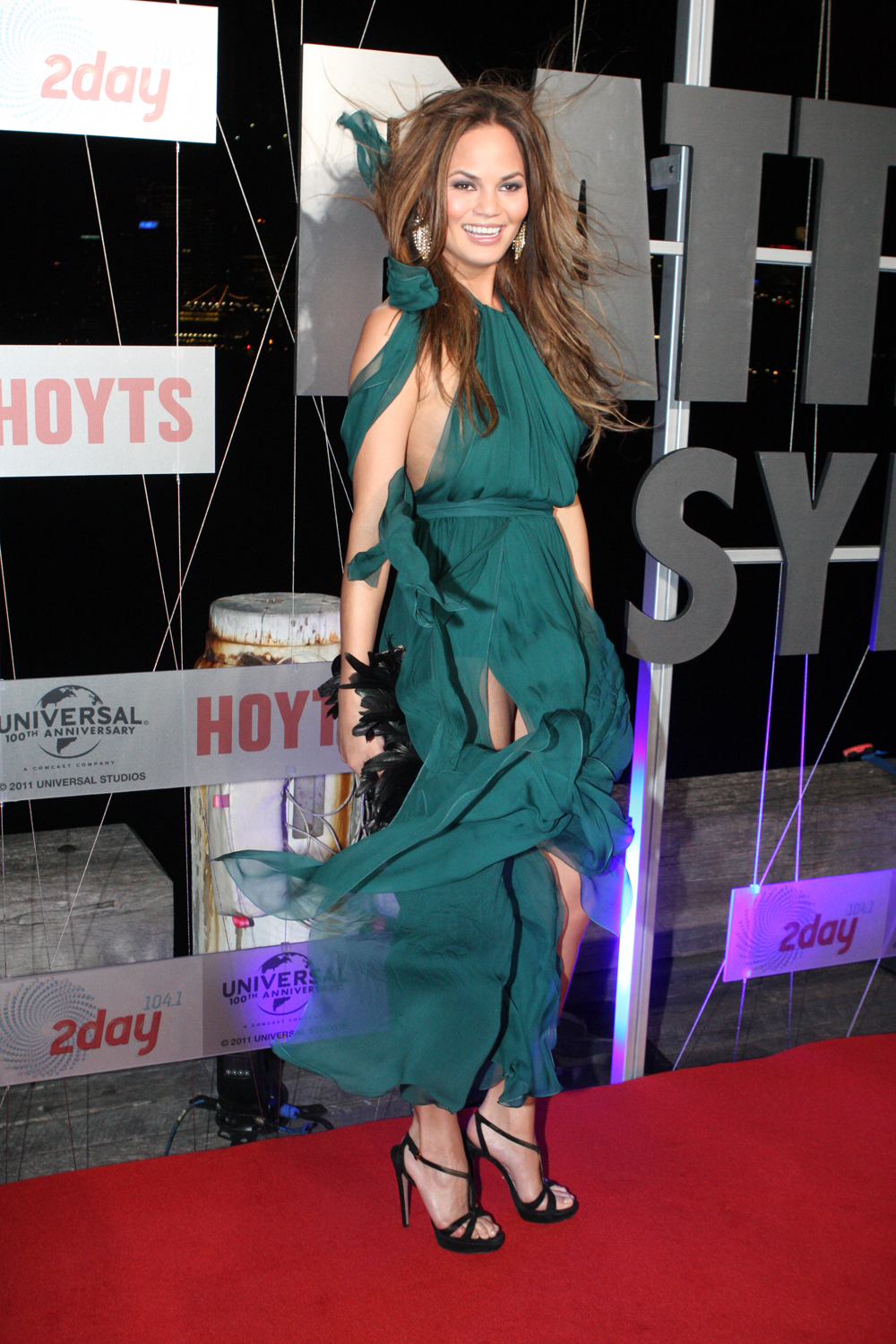
Teigen at the premiere of the film Battleship in Sydney in 2012

Two years later, Teigen was the host of the competition series Model Employee on VH1. She was also featured on another Cooking Channel special, titled Chrissy Teigen's Hungry, detailing her wedding menu tasting with then-fiancé, John Legend. In October 2013, she appeared in Legend's music video for the song "All of Me", which also features footage from their wedding. In April 2014, Teigen played a fictionalized version of herself as a relationship counselor in an Inside Amy Schumer sketch. That same year, she appeared on the 50th anniversary cover of the Sports Illustrated Swimsuit Issue with Nina Agdal and Lily Aldridge. In January 2015, Teigen guest starred on the sitcom The Mindy Project as the girlfriend of the man who was the main character's first sexual partner. In April, she became a co-host of the musical competition series Lip Sync Battle alongside LL Cool J. She co-hosted the 2015 Billboard Music Awards with Ludacris.

From September 2015 until June 2016, Teigen was a food stylist and panelist on Tyra Banks's syndicated daytime talk show, FABLife. In February 2016, she published a book titled Cravings: Recipes for All of the Food You Want to Eat, which went on to become a New York Times bestseller and the second-best selling cookbook of the year. The following year, Teigen released a clothing line in collaboration with the fashion company Revolve. In September 2018, she released her second book, titled Cravings: Hungry For More. Simultaneously, she released a line of cookware through Target. In 2019, she was included on Time's list of the 100 most influential people in the world.

The following year, Teigen appeared as a judge for the comedy competition series Bring the Funny. In November, she launched a cooking website, Cravings by Chrissy Teigen, which features recipes as well as restaurant and entertaining tips. Chrissy's Court, a courtroom-style series starring Teigen, debuted in April 2020 on Quibi. Teigen also serves as executive producer for the series. The series survived the platform's demise later that year, moving to The Roku Channel in May 2021 and premiering its second season in June 2022. It was the platform's most watched unscripted premiere ever. The third season is scheduled to premiere on October 21, 2022.

As of May 2021, Target had stopped carrying her cookware line, which a company spokesperson said was a "mutual decision".

== Political views and activism ==
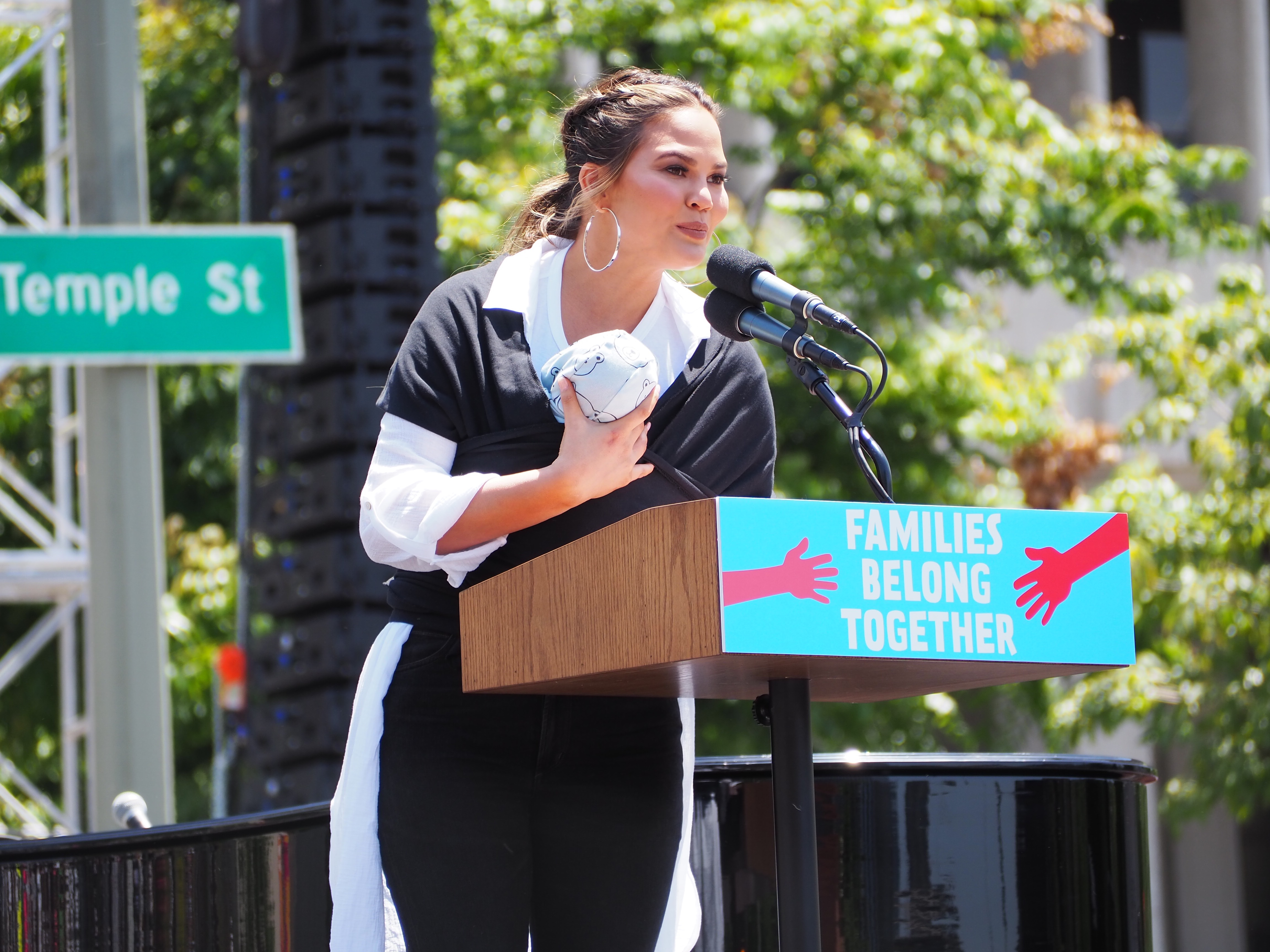
Teigen at a Families Belong Together event in 2019

Teigen identifies herself as a feminist and intends on raising her children as such. She and John Legend made donations to nonprofit organization Planned Parenthood, in 2015, following the Colorado Springs Planned Parenthood shooting and again in 2017. She and her husband John Legend donated $25,000 to March for Our Lives, a rally in favor of gun control, in 2018. A supporter of immigrants' rights, Teigen delivered a speech at a Families Belong Together event in Los Angeles that same year. In May 2020, she donated $200,000 to bail and legal defense funds to aid activists arrested during protests in response to the murder of George Floyd.

Teigen is a vocal critic of U.S. President Donald Trump. To commemorate Trump's 72nd birthday in June 2018, she donated $72,000 to the American Civil Liberties Union, a nonprofit organization. In September 2019, Teigen and Trump exchanged insulting tweets. During a House Oversight Committee hearing in February 2023, it was revealed that Trump had White House staff contact Twitter to demand that Twitter delete Teigen's tweet, which he found objectionable. Twitter refused the request.

Teigen and her husband endorsed Elizabeth Warren during the 2020 Democratic Party presidential primaries. The couple endorsed Joe Biden in the 2020 United States presidential election.

== Personal life ==
Teigen became engaged to singer John Legend, in December 2011, after four years of dating. The couple first met while filming his 2006 music video for the song "Stereo", in which she played his love interest. They married in September 2013, celebrating their wedding on September 14 in Como, Italy. Legend's song "All of Me" was dedicated to her. They reside in Beverly Hills, California. On September 16, 2023, Teigen and Legend celebrated ten years of marriage and renewed their vows by Lake Como, Italy.

Teigen and Legend have four children. Their first two children, a daughter born in 2016 and a son born in 2018, were conceived via in vitro fertilization (IVF). While the couple was expecting a third child in 2020, Teigen experienced pregnancy loss at 20 weeks due to a complication, initially described as a miscarriage. She clarified in 2022 that the loss was "an abortion to save my life for a baby that had absolutely no chance." In 2023, Teigen gave birth to a third child, a daughter conceived via IVF. Their fourth child, a son, was born via surrogacy later in the year.

In May 2021, television personality Courtney Stodden said that in 2011, during their marriage as a minor to actor Doug Hutchison, Teigen tweeted and privately messaged them urging them to kill themselves. Teigen subsequently apologized to Stodden, saying she was sad and mortified at her past self, whom she described as "an insecure, attention-seeking troll". Stodden accepted her apology but deemed it an attempt to save her business partnerships. A month later, Teigen released another apology in a lengthy blog post admitting to cyberbullying. Fashion designer Michael Costello and television personality Farrah Abraham then respectively spoke out about being targets of her attacks, with Costello posting screenshots of taunting messages from Teigen. In response to Costello, Teigen stated that his screenshots had been faked and shared screenshots of praiseful messages from Costello, after which the designer said he had evidence to verify his claims.

On July 18, 2022, Teigen announced that she was celebrating one year of alcohol sobriety. In May 2025, she revealed she had started drinking again after two years of sobriety.

== Filmography ==
=== Film and television ===
Year	Title	Role	Notes	Ref.
2007	Deal or No Deal	Briefcase model	Season 2, Episode 52	
2011	Cookies & Cocktails	Herself	Cooking Channel program	
2012, 2015	America's Next Top Model	Herself / Challenge judge	2 episodes	
2013	Model Employee	Herself / Host	8 episodes	
2013, 2014	The View	Herself / Guest co-host	2 episodes	
2014	Wild 'n Out	Herself	Episode: "Chrissy Teigen/PWD"	
2014	Inside Amy Schumer	Herself	Episode: "Boner Doctor"	
2014	Snack Off	Herself / Judge	18 episodes	
2014	Ridiculousness	Herself	1 episode	
2014	The Getaway	Herself	1 episode	
2015–2016	FABLife	Herself / co-host	179 episodes	
2015–2019	Lip Sync Battle	Herself / co-host	Color commentator	
2015	The Mindy Project	Grace	Episode: "San Francisco Bae"	
2016	The Toycracker: A Mini-Musical Spectacular	Nutcracker	Television film	
2016	Top Chef	Herself	1 episode	
2017	Double Dutchess: Seeing Double	Herself	Segment "M.I.L.F. $"	
2017	Keeping Up with the Kardashians	Herself	Season 14, episode 4	
2018	Hotel Transylvania 3: Summer Vacation	Crystal the Invisible Woman	Voice	
2018	A Legendary Christmas with John and Chrissy	Herself	Christmas special	
2019	The Voice	Herself	Episode: "The Blind Auditions Premiere, Night 1"	
2019, 2024	Celebrity Family Feud	Herself	2 episodes	
2019	Bring the Funny	Herself	Judge	
2019	Between Two Ferns: The Movie	Herself		
2019	Breakfast, Lunch & Dinner	Herself		
2020–present	Chrissy's Court	Herself	Also executive producer	
2020	Ellen's Game of Games	Herself	Episode: "Stink Tank"	
2020	The Simpsons	Herself	Voice; Episode: "The Miseducation of Lisa Simpson"	
2021	Mr. Mayor	Herself	Episode: "Brentwood Trash"	
2021	The Mitchells vs. the Machines	Hailey Posey	Voice	
2022	Untold: The Girlfriend Who Didn't Exist		Executive producer	
2022	StoryBots: Answer Time	Ms. Mushroom	Episode: "Taste"	
2023	Mulligan	Lucy Suwan	Voice; 10 episodes	
2024	After Midnight	Herself	1 episode	
2025	Deal or No Deal Island	Banker	Season 2	
2025	Reading Rainbow	Reader (alongside husband John Legend)	Episode: "Tiny Troubles: Nelli's Purpose"	
2026	Star Search	Herself	Judge	

=== Music videos ===
Year	Title	Artist	Notes	Ref.
2007	"Stereo"	John Legend		
2013	"All of Me"	John Legend		
2016	"Love Me Now"	John Legend		
2016	"M.I.L.F.$"	Fergie		
2019	"Preach"	John Legend		
2020	"Wild"	John Legend		

=== Video games ===
Year	Title	Role	Notes	Ref.
2011	Need for Speed: The Run	Nikki Blake	Voice	

== Bibliography ==
- Teigen, Chrissy. Cravings: Hungry for More. Random House, 2018 ISBN 9781524759735.
- Teigen, Chrissy. Cravings: All Together. Random House, 2021. ISBN 9780593135426.

== See also ==
- Forbes list of the world's highest-paid models
