= FABLife =

American syndicated talk show (2015–2016)

- Genre: Talk show
- Created by: Tyra Banks
- Presented by: Tyra Banks; Chrissy Teigen; Joe Zee; Lauren Makk; Leah Ashley
- Country of origin: United States
- Original language: English
- No. of seasons: 1
- No. of episodes: 180

Production
- Executive producers: Tyra Banks; Shane Farley; Rebecca Mayer; Karl Newton
- Running time: 42 minutes
- Production companies: Summerdale Productions; The Tyra Banks Company (2015) (season 1)

Original release
- Network: First-run syndication
- Release: September 14, 2015 – June 22, 2016

FABLife (FAB being an acronym for "Fun And Beautiful") is an American syndicated daily lifestyle panel talk show that aired from September 14, 2015 until June 22, 2016.

== Production ==
The series, which made its debut on September 14, 2015, was distributed by and in association with Disney-ABC Domestic Television as a co-production with main host Tyra Banks's production company, The Tyra Banks Company.

The hour-long series was produced and originally hosted by Tyra Banks, with a round table lineup including model and food writer Chrissy Teigen, fashionista Joe Zee, interior designer Lauren Makk, and do-it-yourself YouTuber Leah Ashley, using a format similar to The View, The Talk, The Real and The Social, offering up wide range of topics from celebrity gossip to do-it-yourself tips.

The eight ABC O&O stations committed to the show upon its announcement, with other different broadcast groups such as E. W. Scripps Company, Tegna, Media General and Cox Media following.

On November 20, 2015, Tyra Banks released a statement that she would depart the show around the holiday period to focus more on her cosmetics line. She continued to be credited as an executive producer on the series, but made no further appearances on the show.

On January 19, 2016, ABC/Disney announced that it would not renew FABLife for a second season due to low ratings. The series continued to air new episodes that were already scheduled and produced until spring. FABLife ended its run that June, and was replaced by Right This Minute, which the show was migrated from another owned-and-operated stations group, Fox Television Stations.
