= NTH =

NTH or Nth may refer to:

- nth, position n in a sequence for an arbitrary natural number n
- Nth (trigraph)
- Neath railway station, Neath Port Talbot, Wales, National Rail station code
- North
- Northamptonshire, county in England, Chapman code
- Northumberland, England
- Norwegian Institute of Technology (Norwegian: Norges tekniske høgskole)
- Hokkaido Air System (ICAO: HAC), a Japanese airline

== See also ==
- Nth Man
- The Nth Degree (disambiguation)
- Anth (disambiguation)
