= Aankhen =

Aankhen means "eyes" in Hindi and may refer to:

- Aankhen (1950 film) by Devendra Goel, stars Bharat Bhushan and Nalini Jaywant
- Ankhen (1968 film) by Ramanand Sagar, stars Dharmendra and Mala Sinha
- Aankhen (1993 film) by David Dhawan, stars Govinda and Chunky Pandey
- Aankhen (2002 film) by Vipul Amrutlal Shah, stars Amitabh Bachchan and Akshay Kumar
  - Aankhen 2, its unrealized sequel
- Drushyam, a 2014 Telugu-language film by Sripriya, released in Hindi as Aankhen
  - Drushyam 2, its 2021 sequel, released in Hindi as Aankhen 2
- Aankhen (TV series), premiered in 2001

== See also ==
- Ankh (disambiguation)
