= The Nth Degree =

The nth degree may refer to:

- The degree of a polynomial, where n represents a natural number
- "The Nth Degree" (Star Trek: The Next Generation)
- "Nth Degree" (song), a song by New York City band Morningwood
- A mathematically specious phrase intended to convey that something is raised to a very high exponent (as in "to the nth degree"), where n is assumed to be a relatively high number (even though by definition it is unspecified and may be large or small)
- An English saying referring to an unspecified term of a sequence

== See also ==
- Nth (disambiguation)
