= Breakfast, Lunch & Dinner =

2019 American documentary television series

- Genre: Documentary
- Country of origin: United States
- Original language: English
- No. of seasons: 1
- No. of episodes: 4

Production
- Running time: 43–44 minutes
- Production companies: Majordomo Media; Tremolo Productions

Original release
- Network: Netflix
- Release: October 23, 2019

Breakfast, Lunch & Dinner is a 2019 American documentary television series. The premise revolves around chef David Chang meeting a celebrity in a large city in each episode, talking about food and eating various local foods.

== Episodes ==
No.	Title	Original release date
1	"Vancouver with Seth Rogen"	October 23, 2019
On a cannabis-fortified trip back to his hometown, Seth reminisces over dim sum with David. Later, the duo attempt a maze and meet octopus Ceph Rogen.
2	"Marrakesh with Chrissy Teigen"	October 23, 2019
After a sprawling breakfast and succulent lamb in the medina, Chrissy and David try their hand at creating tagines, then hump it through the desert.
3	"Los Angeles with Lena Waithe"	October 23, 2019
Saucy crawfish, deep-fried brownies, bowling alley chow and sneaker shopping are all on the menu as Lena and David share their trusty LA go-tos.
4	"Phnom Penh with Kate McKinnon"	October 23, 2019
Kate and David learn how Cambodia's tragic history has impacted its food culture, dig into durian and consider snackable tarantulas and cockroaches.

== Release ==
Breakfast, Lunch & Dinner was released on October 23, 2019, on Netflix.
