= Herta Elviste =

Estonian actress (1923–2015)

- Born: Herta Marianne Brandt; 12 June 1923; Pärnu-Jaagupi, Estonia
- Died: 29 October 2015 (aged 92); Halinga, Estonia
- Other names: Herta Loit; Herta Eelmäe
- Occupation: Actress
- Years active: 1940–2010
- Spouse(s): Uno Loit (divorced); Lembit Eelmäe (1958-2009; his death)
- Children: 2, including Andrus Eelmäe

Herta Elviste (12 June 1923 – 29 October 2015), was an Estonian stage, film and television actress and assistant theatre director whose career spanned nearly seventy years.

== Early life and education ==
Herta Elviste was born Herta Marianne Brandt to Aleksander Brandt and Aglaida Brandt (née Madisson) in the small borough of Pärnu-Jaagupi in Pärnu County. She was the youngest of three siblings; the oldest, a sister named Leida, and a brother named Meinhard who died in 1918. The family would later change their surname to the more Estonian sounding Elviste.

She attended schools in Pärnu-Jaagupi and from 1939 until 1942 she studied ballet at the Elsa Putnin Pärnu ballet studio.

== Stage career ==
Herta Elviste began her stage career as an actress with an engagement at the Endla Theatre in Pärnu in 1940 at age seventeen until 1950, and again, from 1952 until 1958. Memorable roles of the period have been in productions of works by such authors and playwrights as: Carlo Goldoni, Leo Tolstoy, Hella Wuolijoki, Henrik Ibsen, A. H. Tammsaare and D. L. Coburn.

After her engagement at the Endla Theatre ended, she joined the Vanemuine theatre in Tartu in 1958, making her stage debut at the theatre in the role of Masha in a production of Anton Chekhov's Three Sisters in 1959. She would remain engaged at the theatre for over fifty years; still engaged as a performer at the time of her death. Her final performance onstage at the Vanemuine was as the role of Grandmother in a production of Ödön von Horváth's Tales from the Vienna Woods in 2009. During her later years, colleagues and the media would refer to Elviste simply as the "Grand Old Lady."

During her years at the theatre, she performed in a large variety of stage productions by such international playwrights and authors as: Alexander Griboyedov, August Strindberg, Jerzy Andrzejewski, Friedrich Dürrenmatt, Maxim Gorky, Molière, Astrid Lindgren, Martin McDonagh, and Ingmar Bergman, among others. Notable performances at the Vanemuine in works by Estonian playwrights and authors include those of: Juhan Smuul, Boris Kõrver, Hugo Raudsepp, August Kitzberg, Paul-Eerik Rummo, A. H. Tammsaare, Oskar Luts and Mart Kivastik. She would also work as an assistant stage director in several of the theatre's productions.

== Film ==
Herta Elviste would make her film debut in the role of Maali in the 1961 Jüri Müür directed Soviet-Estonian black and white drama Ühe küla mehed for Tallinna Kinostuudio. This was followed in 1963, by a role in the Lilli Promet penned and Veljo Käsper directed color motion picture film short drama Roosa kübar. In 1968, she appeared in the role of Elma Roll in the Veljo Käsper directed comedy Viini postmark, opposite actor Jüri Järvet; and the same year appeared in the Jüri Müür directed war drama Inimesed sõdurisinelis, based on the 1965 novel Enn Kalmu kaks mina by author Paul Kuusberg. Other film roles followed in the 1970s; the Kaljo Kiisk directed romantic drama Maaletulek in 1973; and Suvi in 1976, directed by Arvo Kruusement and based on the Oskar Luts novel of the same name.

In 1981, she had a small role in the Arvo Kruusement directed drama Karge meri, about the lives of seal hunters living on the coast of the Baltic Sea. The film was based on the 1938 novel by the same name by author August Gailit. In 1989, she appeared in the historic drama Äratus, directed by Jüri Sillart. One of her most popular film roles was in the 1998 Rao Heidmets directed family-oriented comedy Kallis härra Q, in which she plays a central role as Grandmother to two young half-sisters who meet and decide to kidnap her from her unhappy life in a nursing home. The film was adapted from the book of the same name by author Aino Pervik.

== Television ==
Apart from the stage and screen, Elviste has also appeared in a number of feature-length and short television films. The most popular being the role of Juula in the 1977 adaptation of the 1939 A. H. Tammsaare novel Põrgupõhja uus Vanapagan, directed by Jaan Tooming for Eesti Telefim. In 1979, she appeared in the Jaan Tooming-directed Eesti Televisioon (ETV) telefilm Mees ja mänd, opposite actor Heikki Haravee Other made for television films include: Kahe kodu ballaad in 1985, and Armuke in 2000.

== Personal life ==
Herta Elviste was married twice. Her first marriage was to actor Uno Loit, with whom she had a son, Vaino Elviste, in 1948. The couple would later divorce and their son would die in 1975. Her second marriage occurred in 1954 to actor Lembit Eelmäe. Their son Andrus Eelmäe was born in 1956 and also became an actor. Elviste and Eelmäe would remain married until his death in 2009.

In her later years, Elviste lived in Halinga, in Pärnu County. She died in 2015 at age 92.

== Acknowledgements ==
- Merited Artist of the Estonian SSR (1970)
- People's Artist of the Estonian SSR (1978)
- Tartu Star Chevalier (2002)
- Estonian Republic Lifetime Cultural Achievement Award (2004)
- Silver Badge, Vanemuine Theatre (2006)
