= Antti =

- Gender: Male
- Language: Finnish

Origin
- Meaning: Man, Warrior

Other names
- See also: Andreas

Antti is a Finnish masculine given name derived from the Greek name Andreas. In Estonia, the variant Anti is more common. It is uncommon as a surname.

People with the name include:

== Given name ==
- Antti Autti (born 1985), Finnish snowboarder
- Antti Boman (born 1974), Finnish musician
- Antti Juntumaa (born 1959), Finnish boxer
- Antti Hammarberg (Irwin Goodman) (1943–1991), Finnish musician
- Antti Hyyrynen (born 1980), Finnish musician
- Antti Kaikkonen (born 1974), Finnish politician
- Antti Kalliomäki (born 1947), Finnish athlete and Minister of Education
- Antti Kasvio (born 1973), Finnish swimmer
- Antti Laaksonen (born 1973), Finnish ice hockey player
- Antti Niemi (footballer) (born 1972), Finnish football goalkeeper
- Antti Niemi (ice hockey) (born 1983), Finnish ice hockey goalkeeper
- Antti Miettinen (born 1980), Finnish ice hockey player
- Antti Muurinen (born 1954), Finnish football coach
- Antti Ojanperä (born 1983), Finnish footballer
- Antti Okkonen (born 1982), Finnish footballer
- Antti Piimänen (1712–1775), Finnish church builder
- Antti Pohja (born 1977), Finnish footballer
- Antti Raanta (born 1989), Finnish ice hockey goalkeeper
- Antti Rammo (born 1983), Estonian racing driver
- Antti Reini (born 1964), Finnish actor
- Antti Rinne (born 1962), Finnish politician
- Antti Ronkainen (born 1968), Finnish footballer
- Antti Sarpila (born 1964), Finnish swing/jazz musician
- Antti Sumiala (born 1974), Finnish footballer
- Antti Törmänen (born 1989), Finnish professional Go player
- Antti Uimaniemi (born 1986), Finnish footballer
- Antti Viskari (1928–2007), Finnish marathon runner

== Surname ==
- Gerda Antti (1929–2026), Swedish writer

== See also ==
- Anti (given name)
- Antto (disambiguation)
