= Antto =

Antto is a Finnish given name and nickname. Notable people with the name include:

- Antto Hilska (born 1993), Finnish football player
- Antto Melasniemi, member of Finnish band HIM
- Antto Tapaninen (born 1989), Finnish football player

== See also ==
- Anto (name)
- Antti
- Antton (name)
- Atto (disambiguation)
