= Sulev Oll =

Estonian journalist, sports historian and poet

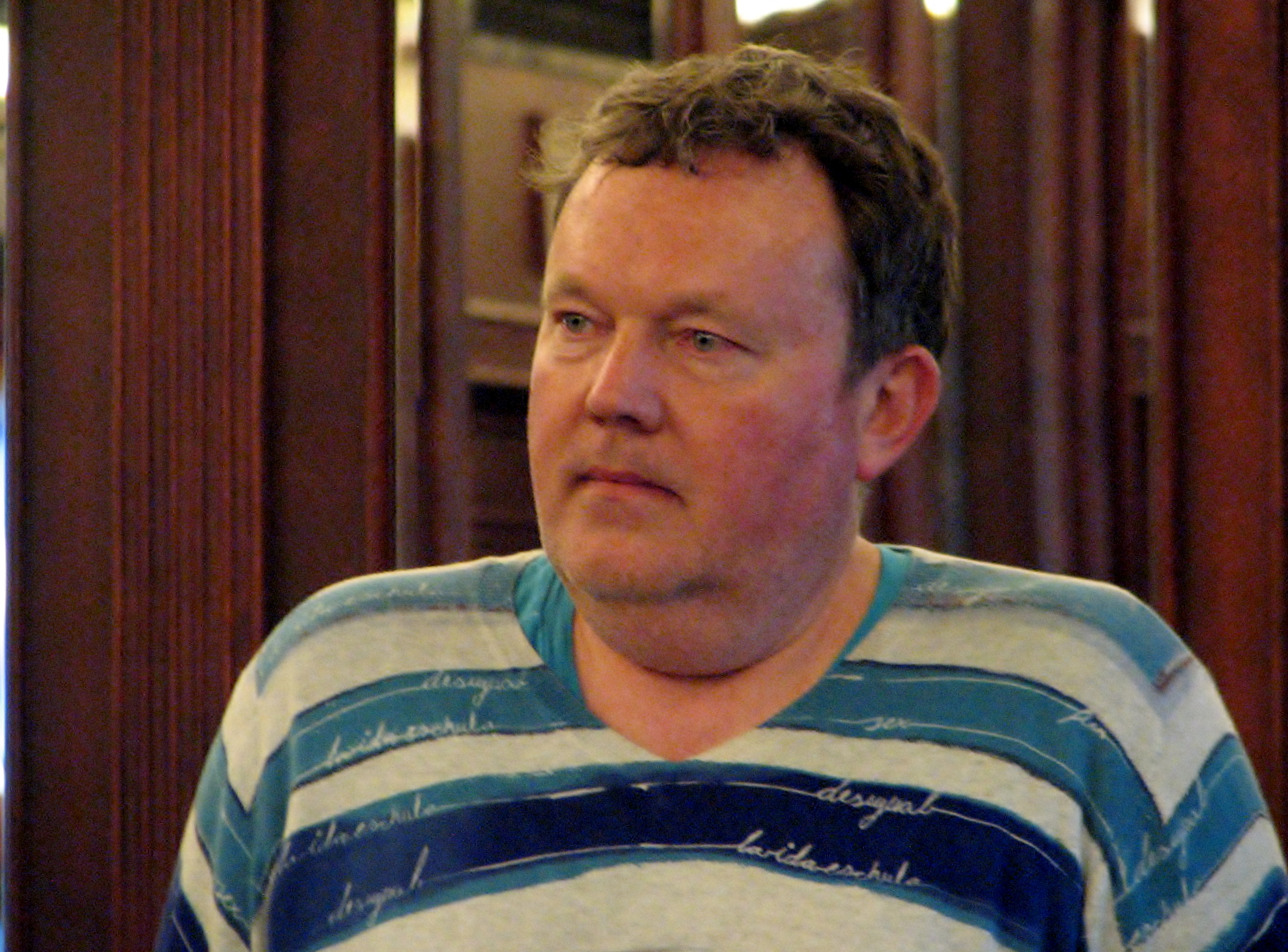
Sulev Oll

Sulev Oll (born March 17, 1964) is an Estonian journalist, sports historian and poet. He has worked for Postimees, a major Estonian newspaper. and is mentioned in the Estonian national biography. As a journalist and writer he is noted for his expertise in Estonian athletic history.

== Biography ==
Oll was born in the small borough of Aseri in Lääne-Viru County. He graduated from Aseri high school in 1982. He excelled in chemistry, mathematics and history and sports. Between 1982 and 1987 he studied history at Tartu State University, graduating in history and social studies with a thesis on the "Athletes of the Republic of Estonia, the country challenge in the years 1920–1940". He studied journalism at the University of Tartu in 1989–1993 with a thesis on "Development of Thought and the farm reflected in the Estonian agricultural journalism from 1987–1993."

Oll has worked as a reporter and senior editor for Postimees. He has published books and made contributions to books about Estonian athletics on the 2004 Summer Olympics in Athens and the 2006 Winter Olympics in Turin. In the late 2000s he has developed as a poet.

== Selected works ==
- Hea Tuju Kuju (2008)
- Aeg Annab Kõik (2008)
- Öö Mõte On Kuus (2008) (with Anti Kuus)
- Vana Sõna Vallatused (2010)
- Printessi Voodikohendaja Päevaraamat (2010)
