= The Next Thing You Eat =

- Genre: Documentary
- Created by: David Chang; Morgan Neville
- No. of seasons: 1
- No. of episodes: 6

Production
- Executive producers: David Chang; Christopher Chen; Dave O'Connor; Chris Ying; Neville aRogers; Caitrin Rogers; Chad Mumm
- Production companies: Tremolo Productions; Majordomo Media; Vox Media Studios

Original release
- Network: Hulu
- Release: October 21, 2021

The Next Thing You Eat is a 2021 six-episode documentary series hosted by chef David Chang. The series explores the food production industry and the changes to the industry caused by new technology and was released on October 21, 2021.

== Episodes ==
No.	Title	Original release date
1	"Delivery: Rise of the Machines"	October 21, 2021
2	"Burgers: Balanced Diet"	October 21, 2021
3	"Restaurants: A Reckoning"	October 21, 2021
4	"Breakfast: An illusion of Choice"	October 21, 2021
5	"Sushi: Say Goodbye"	October 21, 2021
6	"2050: Look Ahead"	October 21, 2021
