= ANTM =

ANTM may refer to:

== Television ==
- America's Next Top Model, a reality TV show and the original Top Model series
- Its international versions:
  - Africa's Next Top Model
  - Asia's Next Top Model
  - Australia's Next Top Model
  - Austria's Next Topmodel

== Other uses ==
- Antam, an Indonesian mining company IDX ticker symbol

== See also ==
- Anth (disambiguation)
