= Ando (disambiguation) =

Ando or Andō is a Japanese surname.

Ando may also refer to:

== Geography ==
- Ando, Nara, Japan
- Ando, Togo
- Amdo, traditional Tibetan province (alternative transliteration)
- Ando, Chinese Korean transliteration name of Antu County
- Ando, New South Wales, a rural hamlet in New South Wales, Australia
- Ando, an islet and the approximately coterminous ri located in Yeosu, South Jeolla Province, South Korea

== People with the given name ==
- Ando Keskküla (1950–2008), Estonian painter and video artist
- Ando Kiviberg (born 1969), Estonian musician and politician
- Ando Leps (1935–2023), Estonian jurist and politician
- Ando Meritee (born 1974), Estonian renju player

== Other uses ==
- Ando (mobile app), a food delivery app
- Ando Media, a company that provides digital content services for Internet radio stations
- Ando, a letter in the artificial Tengwar script
- "Andó", a song by Juana Molina from Halo
