= Pärnu-Jaagupi =

Borough in Estonia

- borough
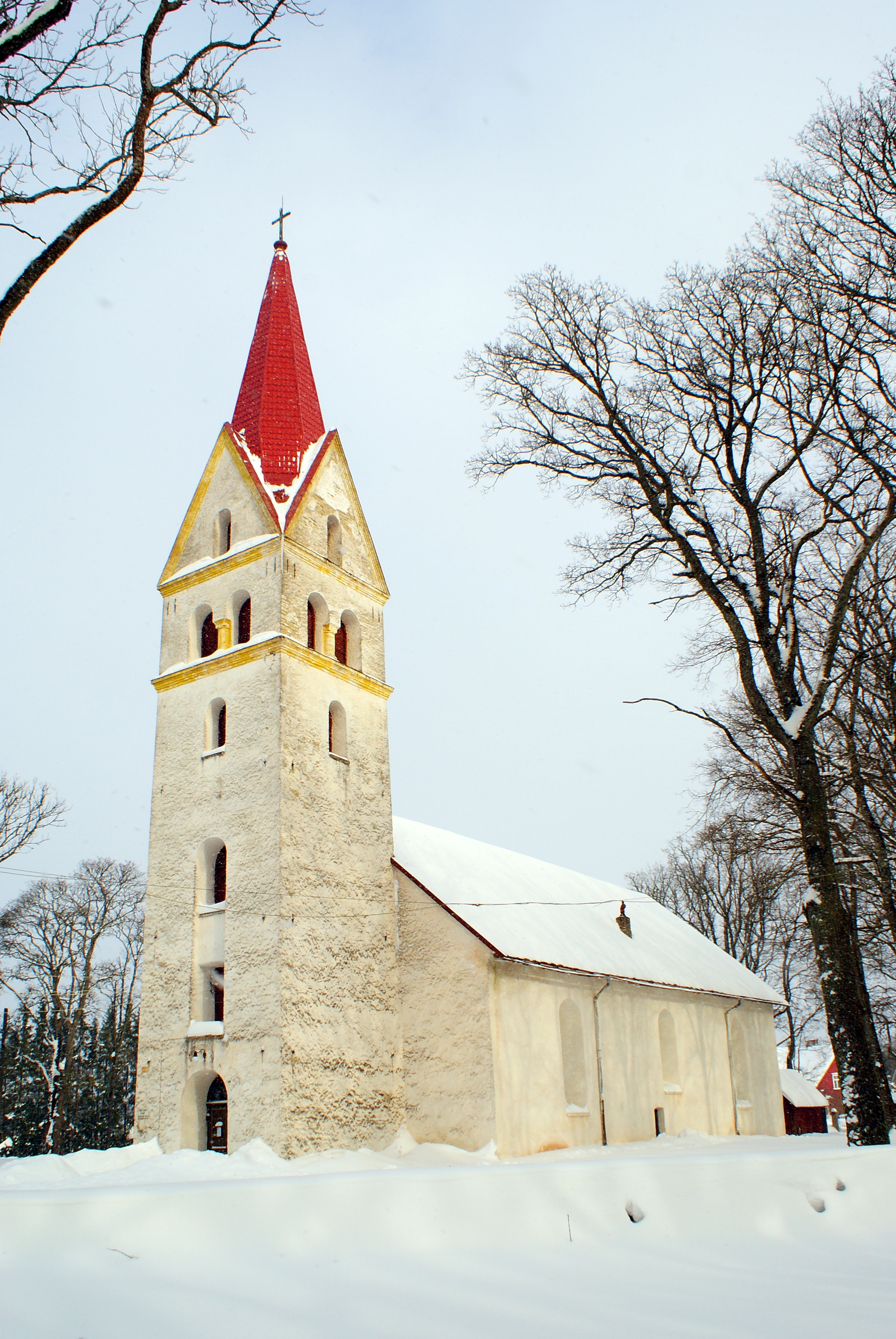
- Pärnu-Jaagupi church

- Location in Estonia
- Coordinates: 58°36′32.57″N 24°30′18.1″E
- Country: Estonia
- County: Pärnu County
- Parish: Põhja-Pärnumaa Parish

Population (09.01.2009)
  - Total: 1,291

Pärnu-Jaagupi (German: Sankt Jakobi) is a borough (alev) in Põhja-Pärnumaa Parish, Pärnu County, Estonia. It has a population of 1,291 (as of 9 January 2009).

Estonian stage and film actress Herta Elviste (1923-2015) was born in Pärnu-Jaagupi.
