= Chrissy's Court =

American comedy court show

- Genre: Arbitration-based court comedy show
- Starring: Chrissy Teigen; Vilailuck "Pepper Thai" Teigen
- Narrated by: Pete Sepenuk
- Country of origin: United States
- Original language: English
- No. of seasons: 3
- No. of episodes: 32

Production
- Executive producers: Chrissy Teigen; Luke Dillon; Dan Cutforth; Jane Lipsitz; Dan Volpe; Mason Steinberg
- Running time: 6-10 minutes
- Production companies: Suit & Thai Productions; Alfred Street Industries; 3 Arts Entertainment

Original release
- Network: Quibi (season 1); The Roku Channel (season 2)
- Release: April 6, 2020 – October 21, 2022

Chrissy's Court is an American comedic arbitration-based court show starring television personality and model Chrissy Teigen and her mother, Vilailuck "Pepper Thai" Teigen. The series premiered on April 6, 2020, on Quibi.

In June 2020, Quibi renewed the series for a second season. Despite Quibi's shutdown, the library was moved to The Roku Channel, and Chrissy's Court was added in May 2021. Season 2 premiered on June 17, 2022. The third season premiered on October 21, 2022.

== Premise ==
Chrissy's Court shows "Chrissy Teigen reigns supreme as the 'judge' over one small claims case. The plaintiffs, defendants, and disputes are real, as Chrissy's mom turned 'bailiff', Pepper Thai, maintains order in the courtroom."

== Production ==
On May 23, 2019, it was announced that Quibi had ordered 10 episodes of the courtroom comedy series starring Chrissy Teigen and her mother, Vilailuck "Pepper Thai" Teigen.

The series is executive produced by Teigen through Suit & Thai Productions, and Luke Dillon through 3 Arts Entertainment.

== Series overview ==
| Season | Episodes | Originally released | |
| Season | Episodes | First released | Last released |
|---|---|---|---|
| 1 | 12 | April 6, 2020 | April 14, 2020 |
| 2 | 10 | June 17, 2022 | |
| 3 | 10 | October 21, 2022 | |

== Episodes ==
=== Season 1 (2020) ===
| No. overall | No. in season | Title | Original release date |
|---|---|---|---|
| 1 | 1 | "C-Rap Music" | April 6, 2020 |
| 2 | 2 | "Situation-Ship Status" | April 6, 2020 |
| 3 | 3 | "100% That Case" | April 6, 2020 |
| 4 | 4 | "That's a Rap" | April 6, 2020 (Note: Users who submitted their email address prior to launch on Quibi's website received access to 3 additional episodes on launch date and were 3 episodes ahead because of that.) |
| 5 | 5 | "Sister Dissed Her" | April 6, 2020 |
| 6 | 6 | "The Pillow Case" | April 6, 2020 |
| 7 | 7 | "Cat-Astrophe" | April 7, 2020 |
| 8 | 8 | "It's Car-plicated" | April 8, 2020 |
| 9 | 9 | "Mood Swings" | April 9, 2020 |
| 10 | 10 | "Something's Phishy" | April 10, 2020 |
| 11 | 11 | "Best Friend to Ex-Friend" | April 13, 2020 |
| 12 | 12 | "Financially Car-plicated" | April 14, 2020 |

=== Season 2 (2022) ===
| No. overall | No. in season | Title | Original release date |
|---|---|---|---|
| 13 | 1 | "Plumb Dog Millionaire" | June 17, 2022 |
| 14 | 2 | "Wild Twerky" | June 17, 2022 |
| 15 | 3 | "Girl Cone Violation" | June 17, 2022 |
| 16 | 4 | "Love Sphinx" | June 17, 2022 |
| 17 | 5 | "Tales From the Crypto" | June 17, 2022 |
| 18 | 6 | "Voguing for Verdicts" | June 17, 2022 |
| 19 | 7 | "Catfished" | June 17, 2022 |
| 20 | 8 | "All About That Bass" | June 17, 2022 |
| 21 | 9 | "Say Yes to the Case" | June 17, 2022 |
| 22 | 10 | "Slots of Drama" | June 17, 2022 |

=== Season 3 (2022) ===
| No. overall | No. in season | Title | Original release date |
|---|---|---|---|
| 23 | 1 | "Too Stressed to Be Blessed" | October 21, 2022 |
| 24 | 2 | "Pen of Thieves" | October 21, 2022 |
| 25 | 3 | "Hatch-it Job" | October 21, 2022 |
| 26 | 4 | "Braid to Order" | October 21, 2022 |
| 27 | 5 | "Air BnBeatdown" | October 21, 2022 |
| 28 | 6 | "Wonder Lost" | October 21, 2022 |
| 29 | 7 | "Paws for Concern" | October 21, 2022 |
| 30 | 8 | "So-So Debt" | October 21, 2022 |
| 31 | 9 | "This Old House" | October 21, 2022 |
| 32 | 10 | "Vegas Baby" | October 21, 2022 |

== Release ==
On March 2, 2020, it was announced that the series would be released on April 6, 2020 on Quibi.

== Viewership ==
The second season's premiere on The Roku Channel was touted as the most watched unscripted Roku Original premiere ever.
