= Atto Tigri =

Italian anatomist

Atto Tigri (22 May 1813 – 1875) was an Italian anatomist born in Pistoia.

He studied medicine in Pistoia and at the University of Pisa, where he became an assistant to Filippo Civinini (1805–1844). Later he was a professor of human and comparative anatomy at the University of Siena.

In the late 1840s, Tigri is credited for providing the first comprehensive description of the reticular tissue of the spleen, which he called trama microscopica. He also did extensive research on the circulation of blood in the spleen. In a treatise titled Nuova Disposizione dell' Apparecchio Vascolare Sanguigno della Milza Umana, he provided an early discussion of tuberculosis and vibrio cholerae.

== Selected writings ==
- Nuova Disposizione dell' Apparecchio Vascolare Sanguigno della Milza Umana (1847)
- Della Funzione della Milza (1849)
