= M. Anto Peter =

Indian technology writer

M. Anto Peter Ramesh (26 April 1967 – 12 July 2012) was a Tamil software vendor and technical writer.

Peter was born in 1967 in Arumuganeri, Tuticorin district, and later he moved on to Chennai. Primary schooling in St. Dominic Savio Primary School-Chennai Perambur, high school in Don Bosco Higher secondary school in perambur Chennai, radio officer course in Ramana Institute Adyar. He was in the first batch of students when computer science was introduced in polytechnic and obviously completed his diploma in computer science and further developed himself with a degree in mathematics and a master's degree in business administration specialising in marketing. He was one of the well-known computer professionals in India who started many missions to spread the computer education to Indian youths at his late 20s. He was the managing director of Softview Media College through which he educated the students in the field of multimedia, print media, graphics, animation and also develops Tamil fonts and Tamil typing software.

== Features ==
Anto Peter was the first to start introducing multimedia training and has conducted more than 500 seminars on job opportunities in the field of multimedia and gives free consultancy for setting up a small-scale entrepreneurship. Peter was the managing director of the institution where students are given training in multimedia, print media, graphics, animation and development of Tamil fonts and Tamil typing software. He has conducted more than 500 seminars on job opportunities in the field of multimedia. People close to him said he used to give even free guidance to young entrepreneurs.

Anto Peter was the member of Tamil Software Development Fund and Semmozch Conference, Semozchi Digital Library, Board of Studies in the University of Madras and 12 five-year plan committee which was represented by the Government of Tamil Nadu. In addition, he was the Governing Council Member of Tamil Valarchi Kazhagam for the year 2007-08.

He died on 12 July 2012 at 3:00 am [Indian Standard Time], of a heart attack. He has actively participated in all worldwide Tamil computing related Conferences and has submitted around 26 Research papers on Tamil computing development.

He was the first to start a Tamil E-zine named Tamilcinema.com, as early as 1997 which still today is very popular among the Tamil community around the globe. This was the only E-zine which was advertised in all the media as it was the first of its kind when the other entertainment news providers were still publishing the news in paper format.

== Books ==
=== Written in English ===
- Macromedia Hand Book
- Multimedia Hand Book
- Keyboard Shortcuts

=== Written in Tamil ===
- Computer Virus
- Adoble Premiere
- Desk Top Publishing
- Corel Draw
- Tamil 99 Brailee Hand Book
- What we can learn in Computer?
- Mobile Phone Terminology
- Learn Computer
- Learn Computer Tamil Typing
- Multimedia Q & A
- Computer Job Ready?
- Internet Guide
- Computer Q & A
- Information Technology Terminology
- Tamil & Computer
- Learn Internet within 24 Hours
- Computer related studies!
- Basics of Multimedia
- Graphics & Animation
- Computer related small business

== Honours ==
Anto Peter holds the many posts and EC membership for many associations and Membership in State and Central Government Associations that are as follows:

1. Kani Tamizh Sangam – President
2. Tamil Heritage Foundation - Secretary
3. Tamil Software Development Fund - Member represented by Tamil Nadu Govt.
4. Semmozhi Conference - Member represented by Tamil Nadu Govt.
5. Semmozhi - Digital Library - Mysore - Member represented by India Govt.
6. 12th Five Year plan committee - Member represented by Tamil Nadu Govt.
7. Member of Board of studies - University of Madras - Tamil Nadu Govt.
8. 16 bit Unicode Standardisation - Member represented by Tamil Nadu Govt.
9. U.Ve.Sa. Library - Governing Council Member
10. Tamil Valarchi Kazhagam - Governing Council Member (2007–2008)

== Awards ==
He has won several Government Awards for his books in Information Technology which are as follows:

1. Tamizhum Kaniporium (Tamil and Computer) Best book government award in 2004.
2. Best Author Award in 2007 at the Neyveli Book Fair subsidised by Central Government.
3. Bharathi Literarian award 2010 by Shiram group.
4. Periyar 2012 Award by Periyar Muthamizh mandram.
