= Momofuku (cookbook) =

2009 cookbook by David Chang

Momofuku (ISBN 030745195X) is a cookbook by the American chef David Chang, the New York Times food writer Peter Meehan, and Chris Ying, who was the editor-in-chief of the food quarterly Lucky Peach. It was published in 2009.

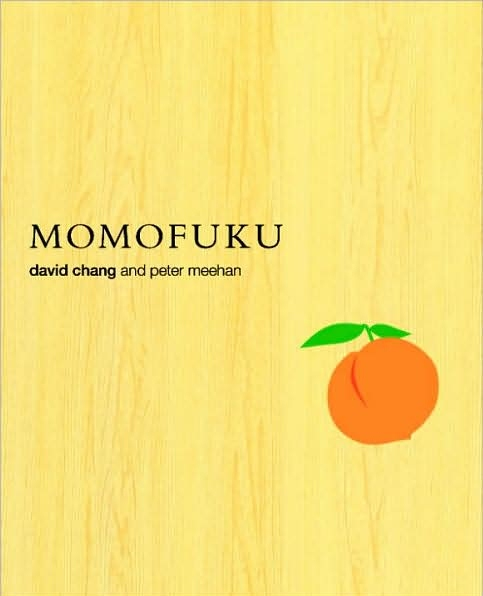
Momofuku

== Contents ==
In addition to describing unique Asian-American recipes centered on the ramen noodle, the book tells the story of launching Chang's popular New York City restaurants sharing the name Momofuku. The book is illustrated by the photo journalist Gabriele Stabile with images of the dishes and scenes of the chef and staff in the restaurants.

The book has three chapters, modelled around each of Momofuku's New York City restaurants: Noodle Bar, Ssam Bar, and Ko, with recipes and stories based around each topic. When writing about the recipes, Chang credits the team of people who actually developed them.

== See also ==
- David Chang
