= Anti Saar =

Estonian writer and translator

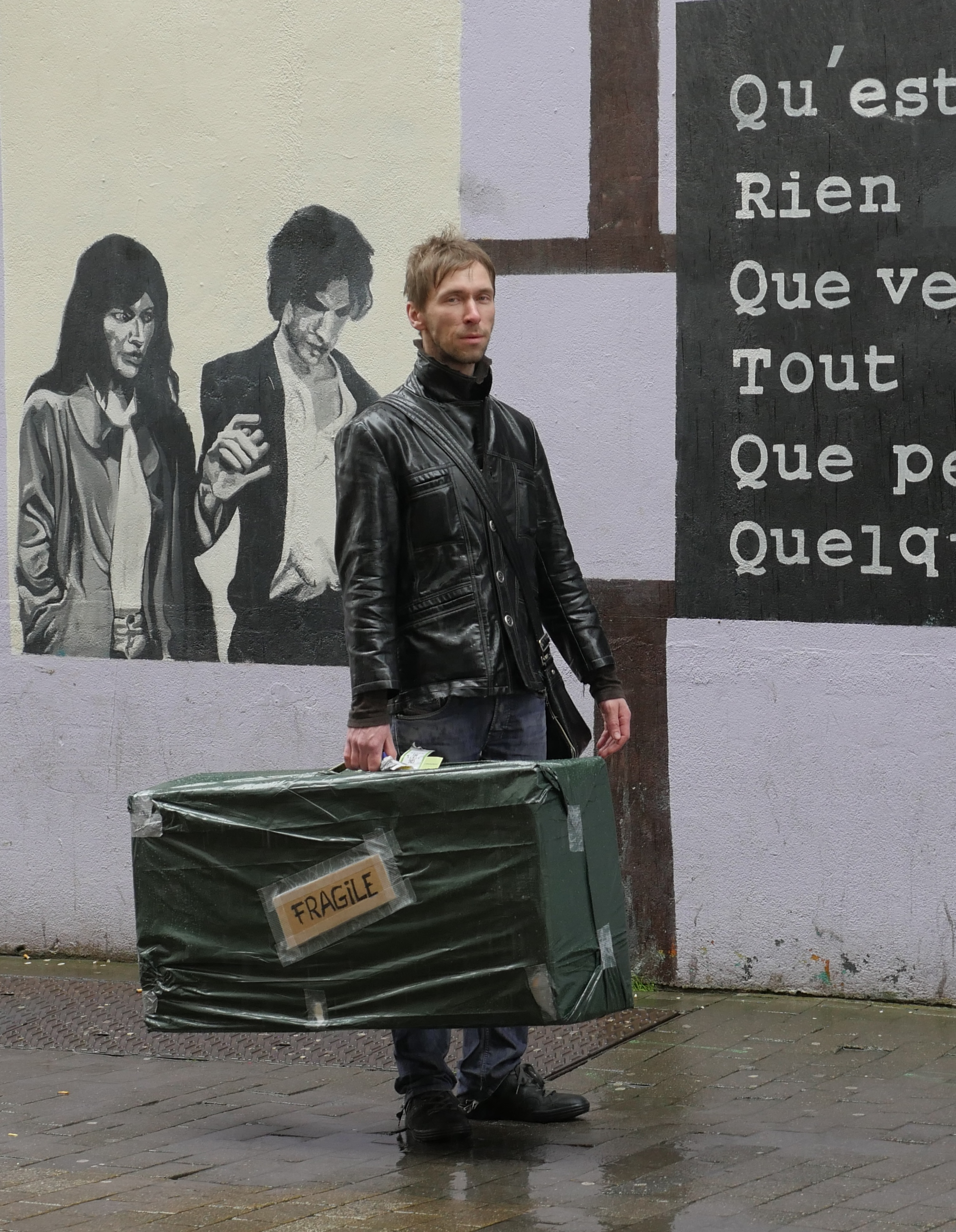
Saar in Nantes in 2015

Anti Saar (born 9 May 1980) is a contemporary Estonian children’s writer and translator.

Saar graduated from the University of Tartu in semiotics.

== Bibliography ==
- Kuidas meil asjad käivad (The Way Things Are With Us), Tänapäev 2013
- Kojamees Urmas (Urmas the Maintenance Man), Päike ja Pilv 2015
- Juturaamat (Storybook), Tänapäev 2016
- Pärt ei oska saltot (Pärt Can't Do a Backflip), Päike ja Pilv 2017
- Külaskäik (The Visit), Päike ja Pilv 2017
- Seisa siin, Pärt! (Stand Here, Pärt!), Päike ja Pilv 2018
- Pärt ja viimane koogitükk (Pärt and the Last Piece of Cake), Päike ja Pilv 2018
- Mina, Milda ja meister Michel (Milda, Master Michel, and I), Eesti Kunstimuuseum 2018
- Pärt ja ploomid (Pärt and Plums), Päike ja Pilv 2018
- Pärt läheb uuele ringile (Pärt Goes Full Circle), Päike ja Pilv 2019

== Awards ==
- 2013 Estonian Children's Literature Centre Raisin of the Year Award (The Way Things Are With Us)
- 2013 Good Children's Book (The Way Things Are With Us)
- 2013 Annual Children's Literature Award of the Cultural Endowment of Estonia (The Way Things Are With Us)
- 2014 The White Ravens (The Way Things Are With Us)
- 2015 Good Children's Book (Urmas the Maintenance Man)
- 2017 Good Children's Book (The Visit)
- 2017 "Järje Hoidja" Award of the Tallinn Central Library (Pärt Can't Do a Backflip)
- 2018 Good Children's Book (Stand Here, Pärt!)
- 2018 Estonian Children's Literature Centre Raisin of the Year Award (Milda, Master Michel, and I)

== Translations ==
Hungarian

- Így mennek nálunk a dolgok, Cser 2018

Polish

- Ja, Jonasz i cała reszta, Wydawnictwo Widnokrąg 2018

Latvian

- Tā iet mūsu lietas, Liels un mazs 2017
- Perts sprukās, Liels un mazs 2020

Russian

- Как у нас идут дела, Издательство «КПД» 2017

Italian

- Una piccola grande invenzione, Sinnos 2017
