= Alajnihah Airways =

Libyan airline

Alajnihah Air Transport
IATA	ICAO	Call sign
2T	ANH	ALAJNIHAH
- Founded: 2005
- Ceased operations: 2010
- Hubs: Tripoli International Airport
- Fleet size: 1
- Headquarters: Tripoli, Libya
- Website: www.alajnihah.com

Alajnihah Air Transport ("the wings", in Arabic) was an airline based in Tripoli, Libya.

== Destinations ==
Alajnihah Airways operated services linking Tripoli, Benghazi, Sabha, Istanbul, Antalya

== Fleet ==
As of January 2008, the Alajnihah Airways fleet consisted of:

- 1 A320 with 168 Seats
- 1 A321 with 199 Seats

Aircraft leased from Atlasjet Airlines until Jun 2010.
