= Anti Kuus =

Estonian businessman

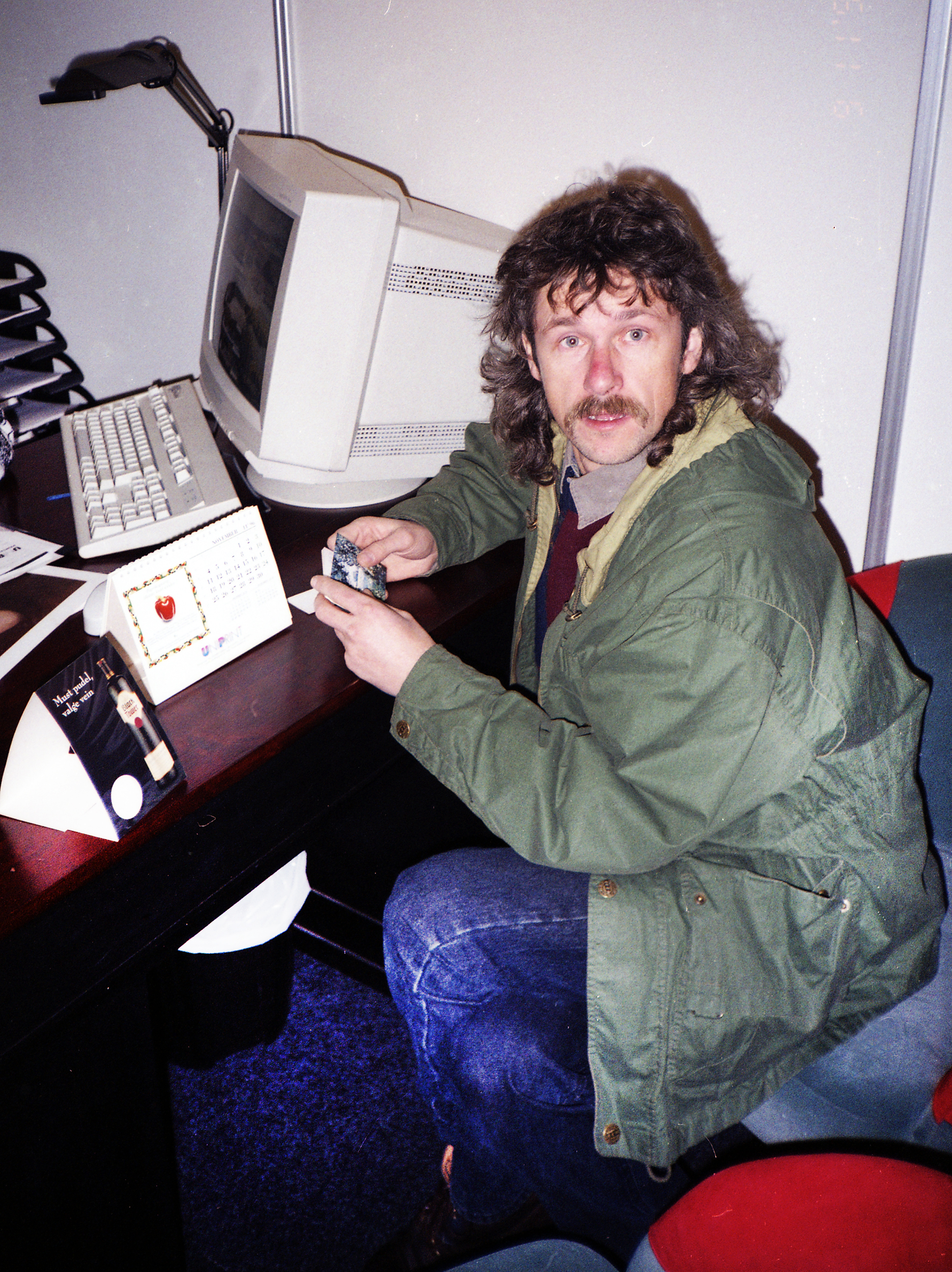
Anti Kuus

Anti Kuus (born 29 December 1956 in Saaremaa) is an Estonian economist, entrepreneur, photographer and singer-songwriter.

== Biography ==
Kuus graduated from Tallinn Polytechnic Institute (now called Tallinn University of Technology), Estonian Business School, and York University (in Canada). He has a master's degree in International Business Administration.

He has worked as economist, finance director and CEO. He has established companies Arco, Baltic Tours, AKTA, Aktaprint... From 1989 to 1992, Kuus was a member of the City Council of Kuressaare. During Estonia's transition from socialism to capitalism, Kuus worked in the Saaremaa Development Centre "Arco" and actively dealt with starting up entrepreneurship and foreign economic relations in Saaremaa.

In 1989, he arranged an international photo festival in Saaremaa with Peeter Linnap as art director.

Kuus started to take a serious interest in photography in 1991, and has since published seven books of his photographs. He deals mostly with nature subjects, especially the natural environs of Saaremaa. His photographs portray the sea and sky in different variations. In 1999–2013, Kuus has published a calendars featuring his nature photographs.

Kuus has held photograph exhibitions in Estonia, the Czech Republic, and Austria.

From 1995 onward, Kuus has split his time between living and working in Tallinn and leisure time on his farm in Saaremaa.

In 2016, he focused in songwriting and released the debut CD album "Saaremaa Blues". His songs have performed also by Nunnu & Rockstar.

== Bibliography ==
Kuus' published works include:

- Saaremaa. AKTA. 1997. ISBN 9789985912102. (reprint 2002)
- Eestimaa [Estonia]. AKTA. 2004. ISBN 9789985912164.
- Väike päike [Small Sun]. Pilgrim. 2004. ISBN 9789985953273.
- Saaremaa & Kuressaare. AKTA. 2006. ISBN 978-9985-9121-8-8.
- Mere ja taeva laulud [Songs of the Sea and Sky]. AKTA. 2006. ISBN 9789985970812.
- Eestimaa II. AKTA. 2006. ISBN 9789985912195.
- Öö mõte on kuus (The Meaning of Night). AKTA. 2008. ISBN 9789985970829. (with Sulev Oll).

== Discography ==
- Saaremaa Blues. AKTA 2019.
