= Adventurers of the North: Kalevala Heroes =

Tabletop role-playing game

Adventurers of the North: Kalevala Heroes (ANKH)
- Rulebook cover
- Designers: Pasi Janhunen
- Publishers: Nelospelit
- Publication: 1988
- Genres: Fantasy
- Systems: Similar to Dungeons & Dragons

Adventurers of the North: Kalevala Heroes (ANKH) is a Finnish role-playing game published by Nelospelit in 1988. It was highly derivative of other roleplaying games and despite its Finnish cultural details, was not a commercial success.

== Description ==
Game box and original contents

ANKH was written by Pasi Janhunen and illustrated by Janhunen and cartoonist Petri Hiltunen.

The design and gameplay of ANKH is similar to the original Dungeons & Dragons game, with some elements borrowed from RuneQuest. A review in the Finnish role-playing game magazine Sininen Lohikäärme compared the game system to that of Tunnels & Trolls. To provide a Finnish flavour, the game is set in the Finnish Iron Age, and some of the characters and monsters are taken from Finnish mythology and the Kalevala, the national epic of Finland. Possible character classes include hunter, blacksmith and sage. The contents of the game box included three rulebooks and dice.

Designer Pasi Janhunen said he had "sunk incredible time and, when necessary, equity" into the game, and that he planned to create expansions and adventures for ANKH as well as a separate board game. However, the game was not a commercial success, and no further material was published.

== Reception ==
In the 1994 book Roolipeliopas (Role-playing Guide), Lauri Tudeer recalled that ANKH "was disappointing compared to the advertising campaign."

In their 2007 book Roolipelikirja (Role Playing Book), Jukka Särkijärvi and Kaj Sotala believed the game design's reliance on other role-playing games explained its lack of success, but thought it might have some value as a collectible: "ANKH may not contain very innovative game design, but it is an interesting curiosity for collectors."
