= Anti Tammeoks =

Estonian politician

Anti Tammeoks (born 29 March 1975) is an Estonian politician. He was a member of X Riigikogu, representing the Union of Pro Patria and Res Publica party.

== Early life ==
Tammeoks was born in Nissi Parish (now, part of Saue Parish).
