= Lembit Eelmäe =

Estonian actor (1927–2009)

- Born: 26 September 1927; Holdre Parish, Valga County, Estonia
- Died: July 2, 2009 (aged 81); Tartu, Estonia
- Occupation: Actor
- Spouse: Herta Elviste (m. 1954, died)
- Children: 2, including Andrus Eelmäe
- Honours: Order of the White Star

Lembit Eelmäe (26 September 1927 – 2 July 2009) was an Estonian actor.

== Biography ==
Eelmäe was born 26 September 1927 in Holdre Parish, Valga County, Estonia.

1951 he graduated from the Estonian State Theatre Institute. 1951-1957 he worked at Endla Theatre, and since 1957 at Vanemuine Theatre.

In 1954 he married actress Herta Elviste. Their son is the actor Andrus Eelmäe.

In 2005 he was awarded with the Order of the White Star, IV class.

He died on July 2, 2009, in Tartu, Estonia at the age of 81.

== Filmography ==
- 1955 "Andruse õnn" (As Luts: Supporting Role)
- 1973 "Slomannaya podkova" (As Grimm: Supporting Role)
- 1978 "Põrgupõhja uus Vanapagan"
- 1987 "Litsom k litsu" (As Godfrey: Supporting Role)
- 1987 "Näost näkku"
- 1989 "Äratus" (As Tähtis Seltsimees: Supporting Role)
