= David Chang =

American chef and TV personality (born 1977)

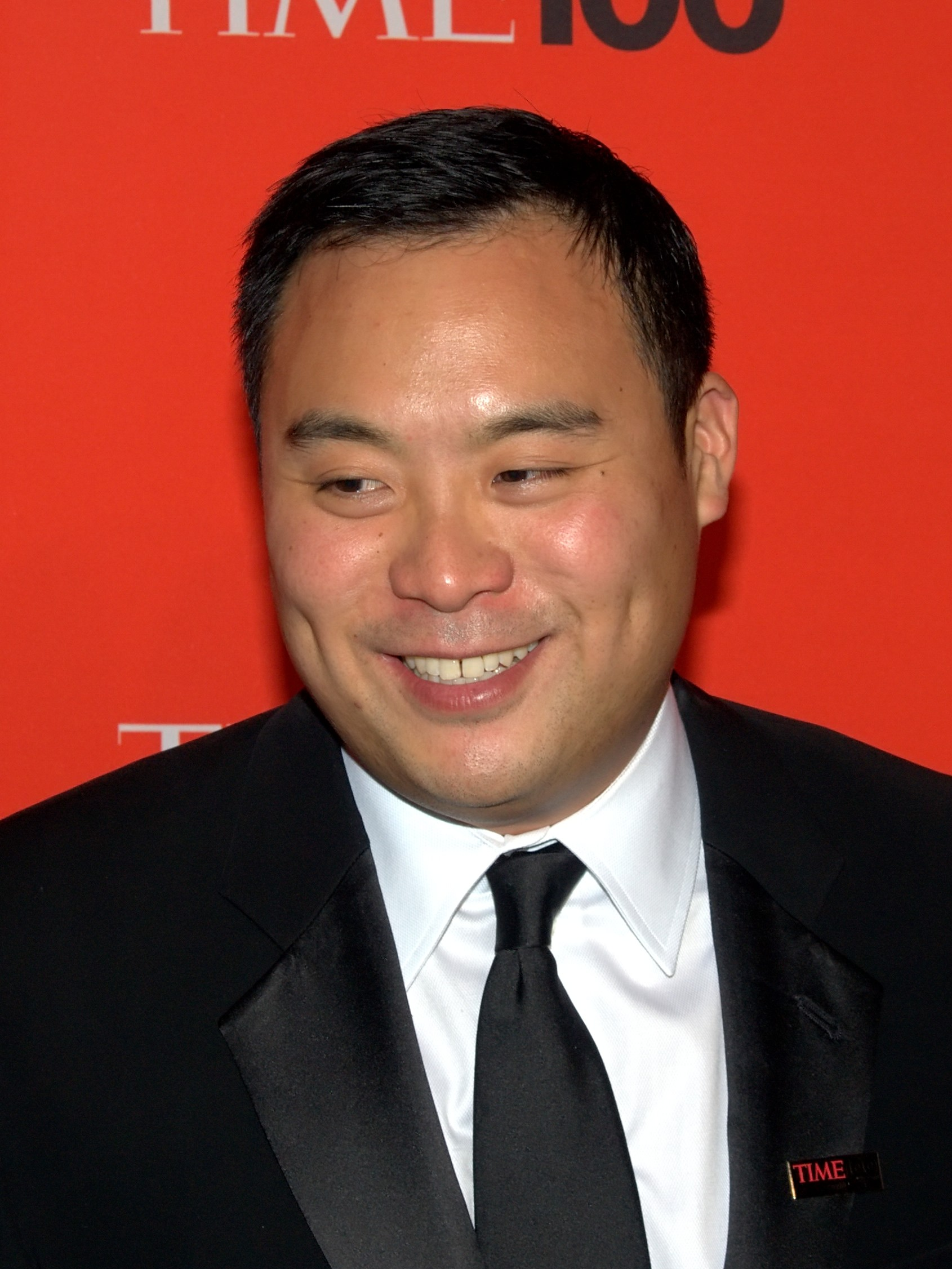
- Chang in 2010
- Born: August 5, 1977 (age 49); Arlington County, Virginia, U.S.
- Education: Georgetown Prep; Trinity College, Hartford; French Culinary Institute
- Spouse: Grace Seo Chang (m. 2017)
- Children: 2
- Culinary career
- Cooking style: New American; Asian
- Current restaurants
- Noodle Bar; Bāng Bar; Momofuku; Majordōmo; Kabawa; Fuku
- Previous restaurant
- Momofuku Ko
- Award
- James Beard Foundation Award

Korean name
- Hangul: 장석호
- RR: Jang Seokho
- MR: Chang Sŏkho
- Website: momofuku.com

David Chang (Korean: 장석호; Chang Seok-ho; born August 5, 1977) is an American celebrity chef, restaurateur, author, podcaster, and television personality. He is the founder of the Momofuku restaurant group. In 2009, his restaurant Momofuku Ko was awarded two Michelin stars, which the restaurant retained each year until its closure in 2023. In 2011, he co-founded the food magazine Lucky Peach, which lasted for 25 quarterly volumes into 2017.

Chang is known for hosting television series about cooking and food, such as Ugly Delicious (2018), Breakfast, Lunch & Dinner (2019), The Next Thing You Eat (2021), and Dinner Time Live with David Chang (2024–present).

== Early life and education ==
Chang was born in Arlington, Virginia to Woo Chung Hi "Sherri", born in Kaesong, and Chang Jin Pil, later Joseph P. Chang, born in Pyongyang. Chang's parents emigrated from Korea as adults in the 1960s. Chang grew up in Vienna, Virginia, with two older brothers and one sister. As a child, Chang was a competitive golfer who participated in a number of junior tournaments. Chang attended Georgetown Preparatory School and then Trinity College, where he majored in religious studies. After graduating from college in 1999, Chang pursued a variety of jobs, including teaching English in Japan, bussing tables, and holding finance positions in New York City.

== Culinary training and career ==
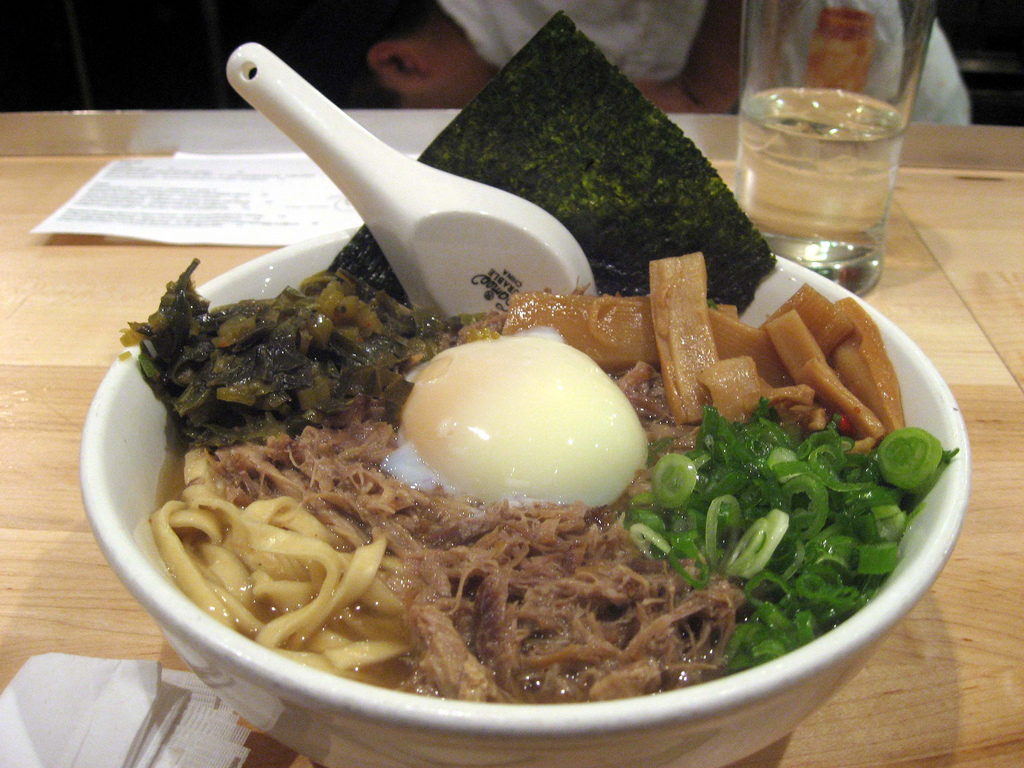
Pork ramen dish from Momofuku Noodle Bar

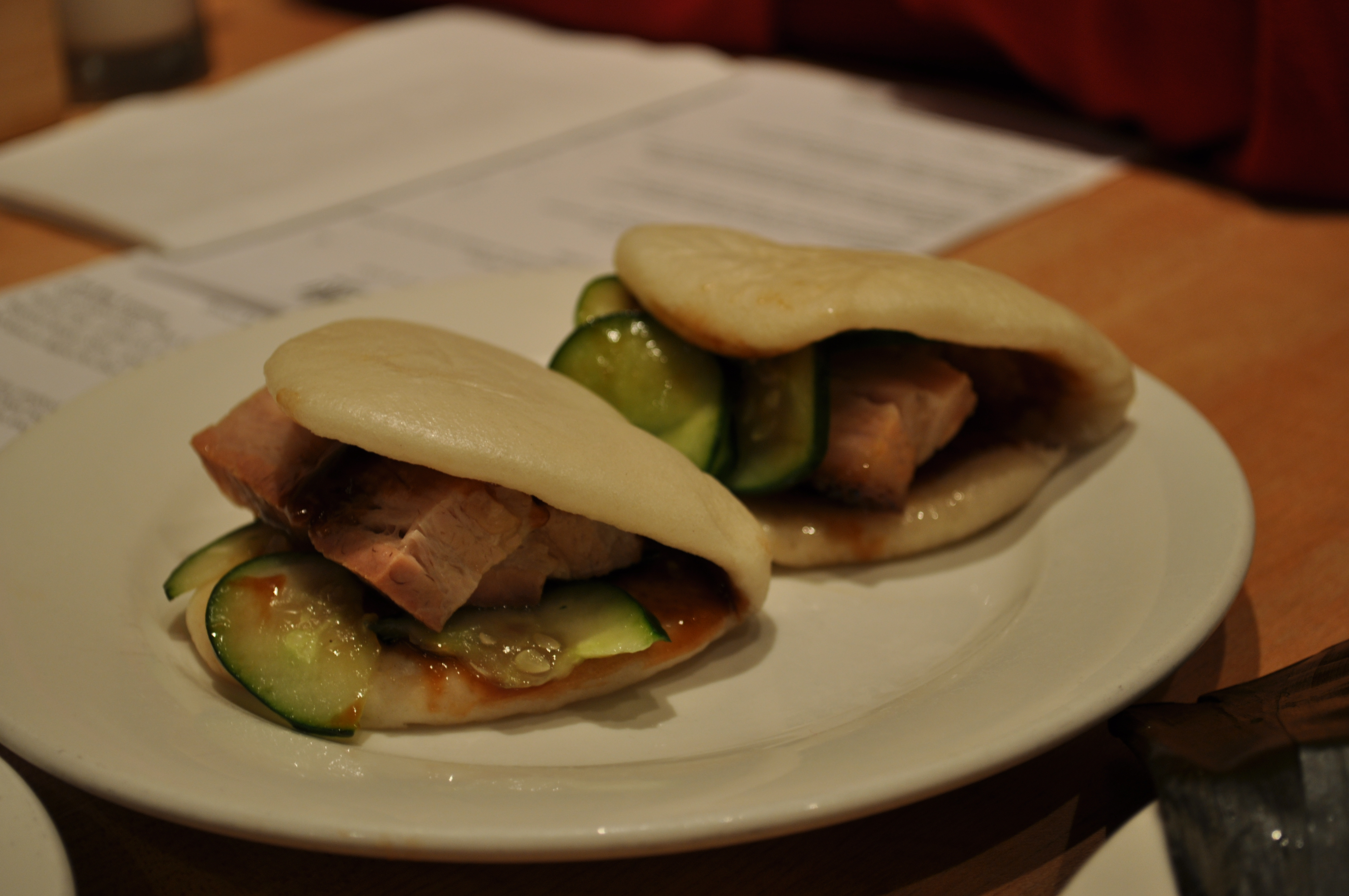
Momofuku pork buns, the restaurant group's signature dish

Chang started attending the French Culinary Institute (FCI)—now known as the International Culinary Center—in New York City in 2000. While he was training, he also worked part-time at Mercer Kitchen in Manhattan and got a job answering phones at Tom Colicchio's Craft restaurant. Chang stayed at Craft for two years and then moved to Japan to work at a small soba shop, followed by a restaurant in Tokyo's Park Hyatt Hotel. Upon returning to the U.S., Chang worked at Café Boulud, where his idol, Alex Lee, had worked. But Chang soon grew "completely dissatisfied with the whole fine dining scene".

In 2004, Chang opened his first restaurant, Momofuku Noodle Bar in the East Village. Chang's website states momofuku means "lucky peach", but the restaurant also shares a name with Momofuku Ando—the inventor of instant noodles.

Later that year, Chang expanded Momofuku Ssäm Bar into an adjacent space with his colleague Christina Tosi, whom he had hired to run Momofuku's pastry program. They named the new space Momofuku Milk Bar, serving soft serve, along with cookies, pies, cakes and other treats, many of these inspired by foods Tosi had as a child.

In May 2009, it was reported that Momofuku Milk Bar's Crack Pie, Cereal Milk, and Compost Cookies were in the process of being trademarked. In October 2009, Chang and former New York Times food writer Peter Meehan published Momofuku, a cookbook containing recipes from Chang's restaurants.

Chang launched Fuku, a chain of fast food restaurants specializing in fried chicken sandwiches, in June 2015. In 2016, Chang launched his first digital-only restaurant, which offers a menu only for delivery in Midtown East and takes orders taken via an app named Ando. Later in 2016, Chang participated in a project hosted by a Silicon Valley startup named Impossible Foods. He prepared food that was later added on the menu of one of his restaurants, Momofuku Nishi, as a partnership between Impossible Foods and David Chang.

In May 2017, Chang announced the opening of a new restaurant at the Hudson Yards development in New York.

In July 2017, Chang announced the opening of his first West Coast restaurant in Los Angeles. The restaurant, Majordomo, opened in January 2018.

== Restaurants ==
Chang's current restaurants include Bāng Bar in New York and Cosmopolitan of Las Vegas, as well as several Fuku restaurants in various stadiums and arenas around the country, for example at Allegiant Stadium in Las Vegas. There is a Bar Kabawa in East Village New York City, a Majordōmo in Los Angeles, and Momofuku Noodle Bars in East Village, Manhattan, Uptown New York City, and Cosmopolitan of Las Vegas. Chang also has Peach Palace at John F. Kennedy International Airport and Super Peach at Century City in Los Angeles.

=== Former restaurants ===
==== Australia ====
In November 2010, Chang announced the opening of his first restaurant outside the US in Sydney, Australia. Momofuku Seiōbo opened in October 2011 at the redeveloped Star City Casino in Pyrmont, New South Wales. The restaurant was awarded three hats from the Sydney Morning Herald Good Food Guide in its first year and was named Best New Restaurant. In 2021, it closed.

==== Canada ====
In late 2012, Chang opened a location of Momofuku in downtown Toronto. The restaurant was located in a three-story glass cube. Momofuku Toronto was made up of three restaurants, Noodle Bar, Daishō and Shōtō, as well as a bar, Nikai. Daishō and Shōtō closed in late 2017, and the space was refurbished. A new Momofuku restaurant, Kojin, opened in the space in 2018. Momofuku Toronto and Kojin closed in 2022.

==== United States ====
In August 2006, Chang's second restaurant, Momofuku Ssäm Bar, opened in the East Village. The Infatuation rated it a high 8.4/10, calling the menu "inventive, exciting, and different." It closed on September 30, 2023.

In March 2008, Chang opened Momofuku Ko in New York, New York, a 12-seat restaurant that takes reservations ten days in advance, online only, on a first-come-first-served basis. The restaurant earned two-Michelin stars in 2009 and closed on November 4, 2023.

In May 2010, Chang opened Má Pêche in midtown Manhattan, which closed in June 2018.

On December 30, 2019, Chang opened the 250-seat Majordomo Meat & Fish restaurant in The Palazzo tower of The Venetian Las Vegas. Chang's Majordomo and Moon Palace closed at Palazzo on June 6, 2022.

In March 2020, in response to the COVID-19 pandemic, Momofuku restaurant group made the decision to temporarily close its restaurants. Later that year, they decided to consolidate some restaurants, and permanently close Momofuku Nishi in Manhattan's Chelsea neighborhood, and Momofuku CCDC in Washington, D.C.

Additional former restaurants include a number of Fuku restaurants in New York, various Momofuku restaurants in the United States and Canada and Delaware, a Kāwi.

== Media career ==
=== Television ===
In 2010, he appeared in the fifth episode of HBO's Treme alongside fellow chefs Tom Colicchio, Eric Ripert and Wylie Dufresne. His presence on the show was expanded in the second season when one of the characters, a New Orleans chef who has moved to New York City, takes a job in his restaurant. Chang has also served as a guest judge on the reality show Top Chef: All Stars. In 2011, he was a guest judge on MasterChef Australia. Chang hosted the first season of the PBS food series The Mind of a Chef, which was executive produced by Anthony Bourdain and premiered in the fall of 2012. In September 2013, David appeared on a skit on the Deltron 3030 album, Event 2. In 2016, he guest starred as himself in the IFC series Documentary Now! episode "Juan Likes Rice & Chicken", a parody of Jiro Dreams of Sushi. In 2018, Chang created, produced, and starred in a Netflix original series, Ugly Delicious. Chang also appeared in another Netflix series The Chef Show, produced by his friends Roy Choi and Jon Favreau. In 2019, he produced a Netflix original titled "Breakfast, Lunch & Dinner" with guest stars including Seth Rogen and Kate McKinnon. He hosted the documentary film series The Next Thing You Eat. On November 29, 2020, he became the first celebrity to win the $1,000,000 top prize for his charity, Southern Smoke Foundation, and the fourteenth overall million dollar winner on Who Wants to Be a Millionaire. David Chang appeared as a fictionalized version of himself in the Apple TV+ original series Loot. In 2024, David Chang began hosting another Netflix original, a live late night talk show titled "Dinner Time Live with David Chang." In 2026, he starred in the original six part CNN series The Detour with David Chang.

=== Writing ===
In summer 2011, Chang released the first issue of his Lucky Peach food magazine, a quarterly publication created with Peter Meehan and published by McSweeney's. The theme of Issue 1 was Ramen. Contributors included Anthony Bourdain, Wylie Dufresne, Ruth Reichl, and Harold McGee. The theme of Issue 2 is The Sweet Spot, and Issue 2 reached #3 on the New York Times bestsellers list. Contributors to Issue 2 include Bourdain, Harold McGee, Momofuku Milk Bar's Christina Tosi, Daniel Patterson and Russell Chatham. Issue 3: Chefs and Cooks, was released on March 13 and was also a New York Times bestseller. Each subsequent issue continued to focus on a particular theme. Lucky Peach discontinued after 25 issues in 2017.

=== Selected filmography ===
Year	Title	Role	Notes
2009 – 2012	Late Night with Jimmy Fallon	Himself	5 Episodes
2009 – 2012	Anthony Bourdain: No Reservations	Himself	2 Episodes
2010	Late Show with David Letterman	Himself	Episode: "Demi Moore/Chef David Chang/Justin Nozuka"
2010 – 2011	MasterChef Australia	Guest chef	3 Episodes
2012	The Mind of a Chef	Himself	16 Episodes
2013	Masterchef Australia: The Professionals	Guest chef	Episode: "Grand Finale"
2013	Top Chef	Guest judge	2 Episodes
2014	Top Chef Canada	Guest judge	Episode: "The World According to Chang"
2014–2024	The Tonight Show Starring Jimmy Fallon	Himself	3 Episodes
2018 – 2020	Ugly Delicious	Host	Netflix; 12 Episodes
2018 – 2024	Jimmy Kimmel Live!	Himself	3 Episodes
2019	The Chef Show	Himself	2 Episodes
2019	Breakfast, Lunch & Dinner	Host	Netflix; 4 Episodes
2020 – 2024	Who Wants to Be a Millionaire	Himself	3 Episodes
2021	Roadrunner: A Film About Anthony Bourdain	Himself	
2021	The Kelly Clarkson Show	Himself	2 Episodes
2021	The Next Thing You Eat	Host	Hulu; 6 Episodes
2021 – 2023	The Drew Barrymore Show	Himself	3 Episodes
2024	Good Morning America	Himself	Episode: "Calista Flockhart/Jamie Oliver/Chrissy Teigen/David Chang/Jackie Evancho"
2024 – present	Dinner Time Live with David Chang	Host	Netflix; 37 Episodes
2024	Celebrity Family Feud	Guest	Episode: "Chrissy Teigen & John Legend vs. David Chang and Deadliest Catch vs Star Trek Universe"

== Public image ==
Epicurious described Chang as having a "bad-boy attitude" for having no reservations or vegetarian options. Chang created a controversy in 2009 by making dismissive remarks about California chefs, telling Anthony Bourdain, "They don't manipulate food, they just put figs on a plate."

Chang serves on the Food Council at City Harvest and the Culinary Council at Food Bank for New York City, two hunger-relief organizations. He is also a member of the board of trustees at MOFAD, the Museum of Food and Drink in New York City.

== Controversy ==
In 2024, Chang's company, Momofuku, drew criticism after sending cease and desist notices over the use of their trademark "chili crunch". In a statement to the Los Angeles Times, Momofuku argued that the trademark was not intended to stifle any competition surrounding the sauces, stating that "When we created our product, we wanted a name we could own and intentionally picked 'Chili Crunch' to further differentiate it from the broader chili crisp category."

On April 12, 2024, Chang issued a public apology regarding the issue on his podcast, The Dave Chang Show, stating that Momofuku had not intended to upset with their legal actions, and noted that Momofuku would no longer attempt to enforce the trademark.

At the height of his success, Chang has admitted to and been accused of being violent and fostering a toxic working environment by former employees.

== Awards ==
- James Beard Foundation Awards
  - 2007 James Beard Rising Star Chef of the Year
  - 2008 James Beard Best Chef New York City for Momofuku Ssäm Bar
  - 2009 James Beard Best New Restaurant for Momofuku Ko
  - 2013 James Beard Outstanding Chef
  - 2014 James Beard Foundation Who's Who in Food and Beverage in America
- 2010 Time 100 Most Influential People

== Publications ==
- David Chang; Peter Meehan (October 27, 2009). Momofuku. Clarkson N Potter Publishers. ISBN 978-0-307-45195-8.
- David Chang; Chris Ying, eds. (July 12, 2011). Lucky Peach. ISBN 9781936365463.
- David Chang; Gabe Ulla (2020-09-08). Eat a Peach.
- David Chang; Priya Krishna (October 26, 2021). Cooking at Home or, How I Learned to Stop Worrying About Recipes (And Love My Microwave): A Cookbook. Clarkson N Potter Publishers/Ten Speed. ISBN 9781524759254.
