= BYD Atto =

Automotive nameplate by BYD Auto

BYD Atto may refer to:

- BYD Atto 1, a battery electric hatchback, labeled BYD Seagull in some markets
- BYD Atto 2, a battery electric and plug-in hybrid SUV, labeled BYD Yuan Up in some markets
- BYD Atto 3, a battery electric SUV, labeled BYD Yuan Plus in some markets
- BYD Atto 8, a battery electric and plug-in hybrid SUV, labeled BYD Tang L in some markets
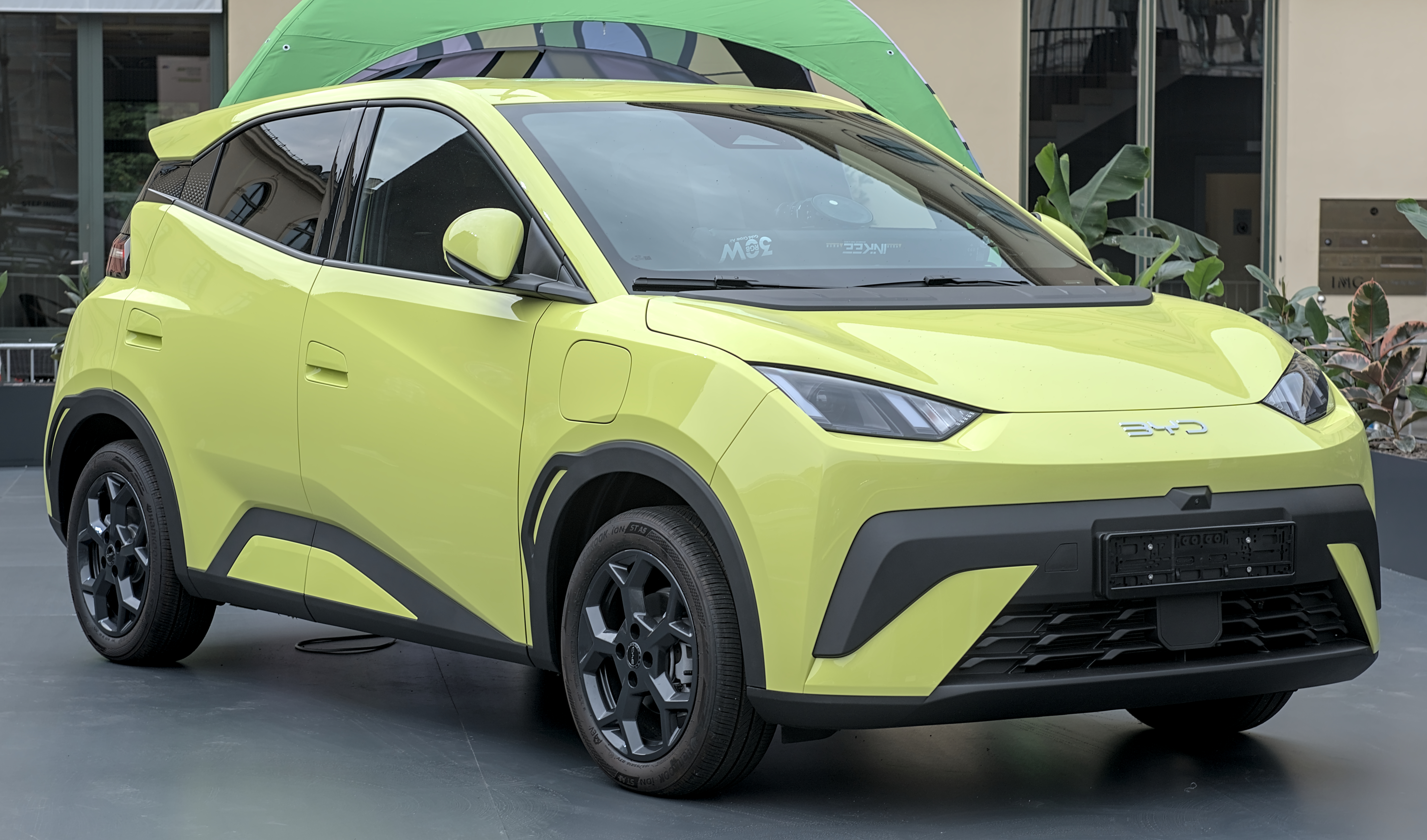
BYD Atto 1

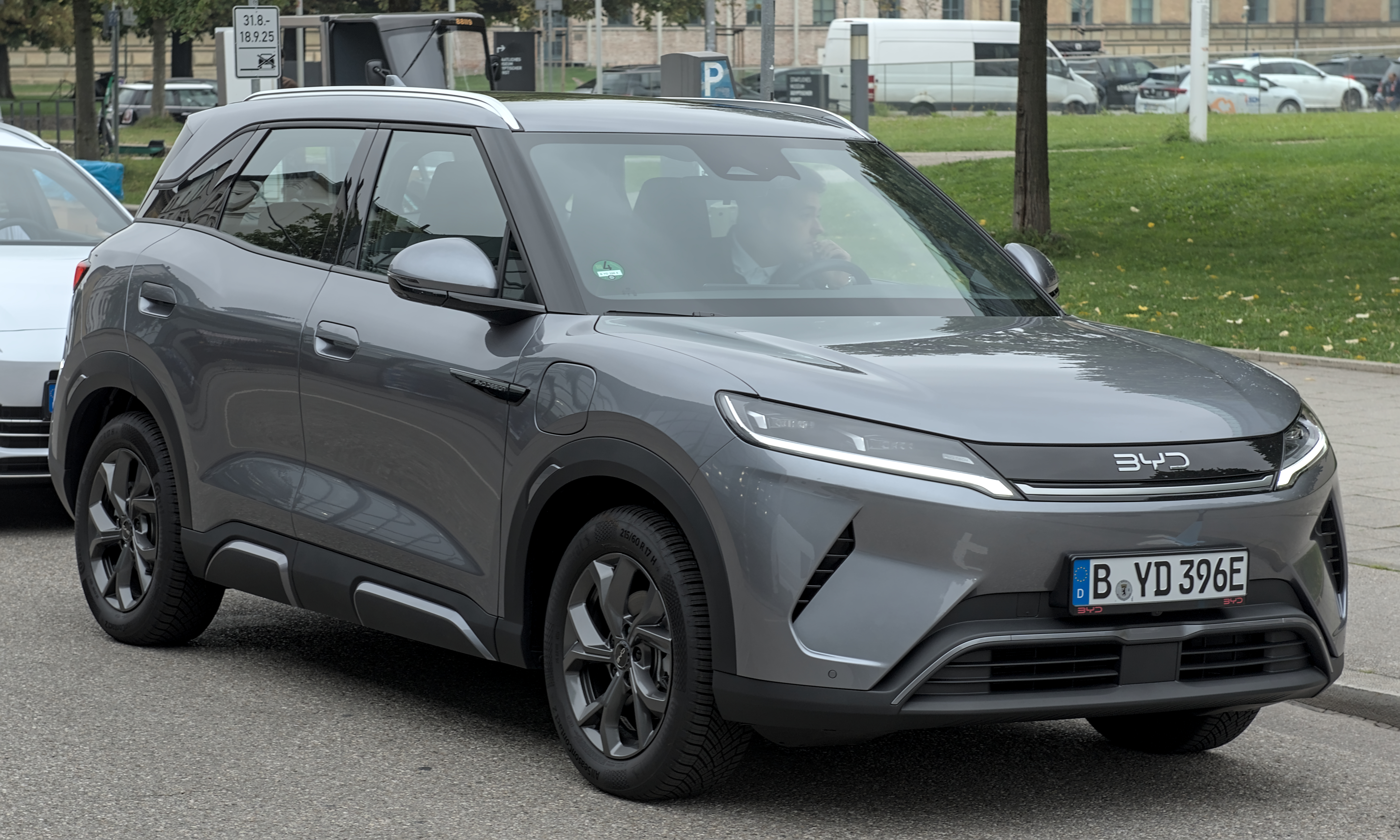
BYD Atto 2

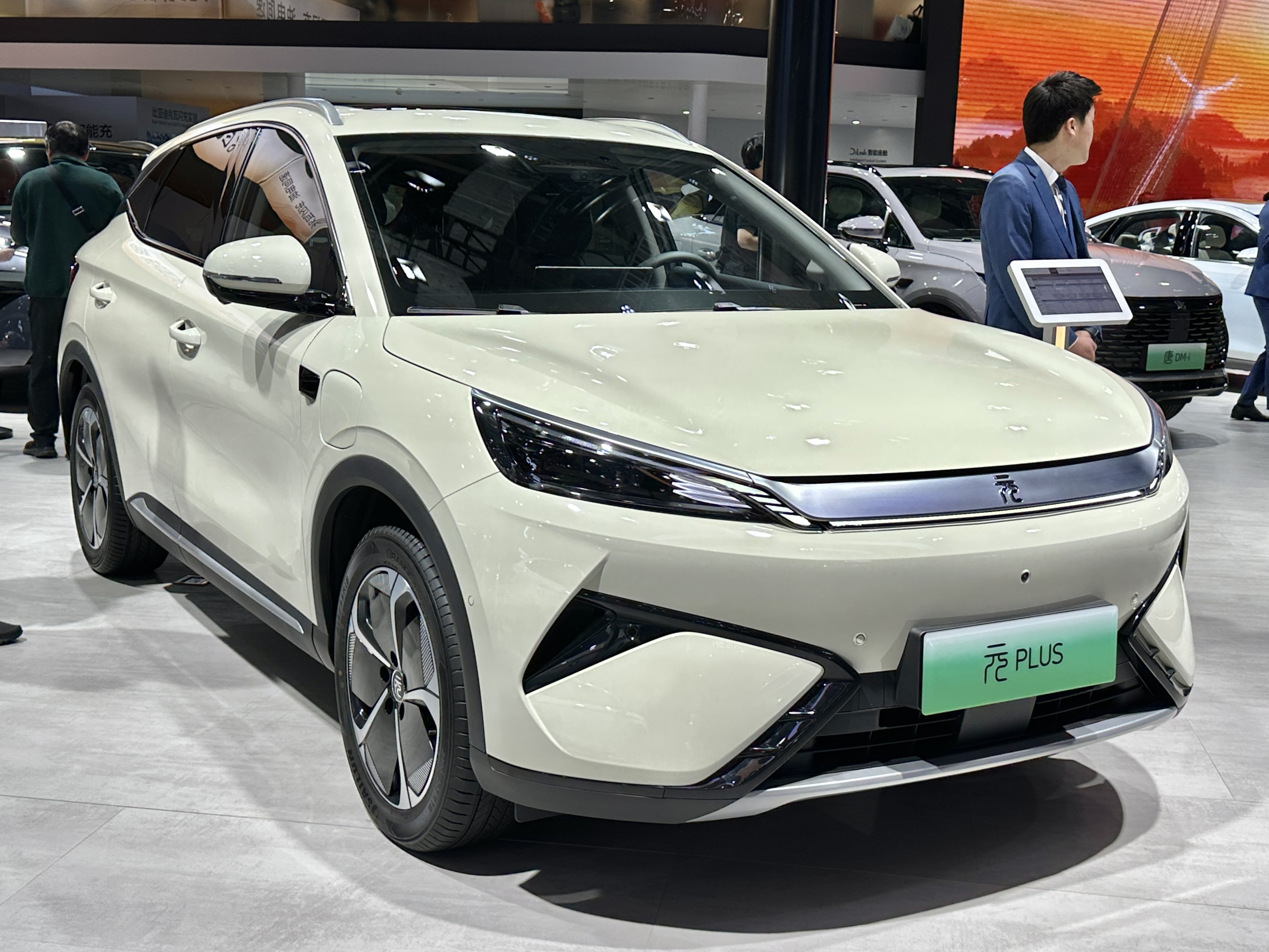
BYD Atto 3

BYD Atto 8

== See also ==
- List of BYD Auto vehicles
