= Anth (name) =

Anth is a nickname. Notable people with this name include the following:

- Anth Lormor, nickname for Anthony Lormor who is also known as Tony Lormor, (born 1970) English footballer
- Anth Smith, nickname for Anthony Smith, (born 1971), English footballer

== See also ==
- Ant (name)
- Ante (name)
- Anto (name)
- Ants (given name)
