= Atto Mensah =

Football player and coach (born 1964)

Atto Ayippey Mensah (born 1964) is a football coach and former player. He lives in the Netherlands and holds both Sierra Leonean and Dutch citizenship.

== Life and career ==
Born in Ghana, he came to Sierra Leone in 1980 and played for East End Lions and won the championship in 1980 and 1985. Mensah gained Sierra Leonean citizenship in 1987.

An attacking midfielder, Mensah made his international debut for the Sierra Leone national team in the 1988 African Cup of Nations qualification competition in a 2–0 victory over Nigeria in July 1987. He made six caps before moving to the Netherlands in 1989. There he had a trial at Sparta Rotterdam and played in the amateur ranks ending at ASV Arsenal. He got his UEFA B-licence in the Netherlands and worked as a youth coach. He is currently head coach of amateur-side ASV Arsenal in Amsterdam.

Mensah was appointed by the Ministry of Sport in September 2014, replacing the Northern Irish manager Johnny McKinstry in the role of manager of the Sierra Leone national team for the remaining 2015 Africa Cup of Nations qualification matches. He was replaced by John Ajina Sesay, who was appointed by the Sierra Leone Football Association in October 2014.
