= Anto (restaurant) =

- Interactive map of Anto

Restaurant information
- Established: 2023
- Closed: 2024
- Head chef: Luke Yoon
- Food type: Korean
- Location: 243 E. 58th St., Manhattan, New York, 10022
- Coordinates: 40°45′37″N 73°57′55″W

Anto Korean Steakhouse, often stylized simply as Anto, was a Korean steakhouse in the Midtown East neighborhood of Manhattan in New York City. Opened in early 2023 in the former location of Felidia, the restaurant closed on March 31, 2024.

== History ==
Anto was opened in March 2023 by Tony Park, a Korean-Italian restaurateur.

Anto opened in the former home of Felidia, the long-running Italian restaurant associated with Lidia Bastianich, and characterized Anto as an expansion of Park’s Antoya Korean BBQ in Koreatown.

Anto's last day of service was Sunday, March 31, 2024.

== Offerings ==
Anto operated as a high-end Korean steakhouse with a cocktail bar, Korean barbecue and private dining. The restaurant's second floor was a poker club.

It was known for a seven-course menu priced at $110.

== Reviews ==
Neha Talreja, for his review in The Infatuation, referred to the restaurant's raw bar dishes, as "electrifying".
