= University of Bielsko-Biała =

Technical university in Bielsko-Biała, Poland

Coordinates: 49°47′0.25″N 19°3′28.7″E

- Uniwersytet Bielsko-Bialski
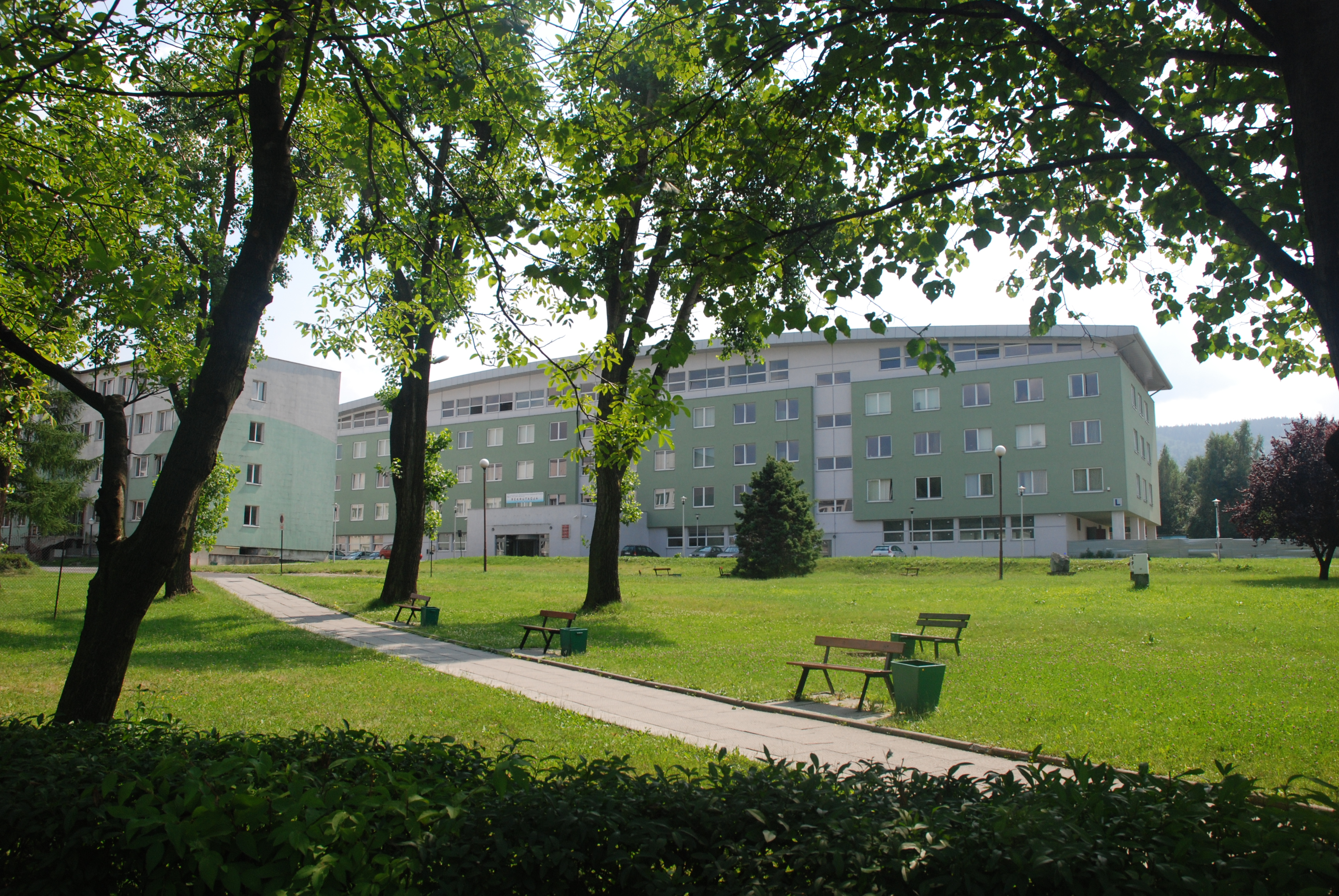
- Campus
- Latin: Universitas Bielscensis-Bialensis
- Motto: Open for the future
- Established: October, 2001
- Affiliations: Socrates-Erasmus
- Rector: Jacek Nowakowski
- Faculty: 200
- Administrative staff: 400
- Students: 4,167 (12.2023)
- Location: ul. Willowa 2, 43-309, Bielsko-Biała, Poland
- Website: www.ubb.edu.pl/en

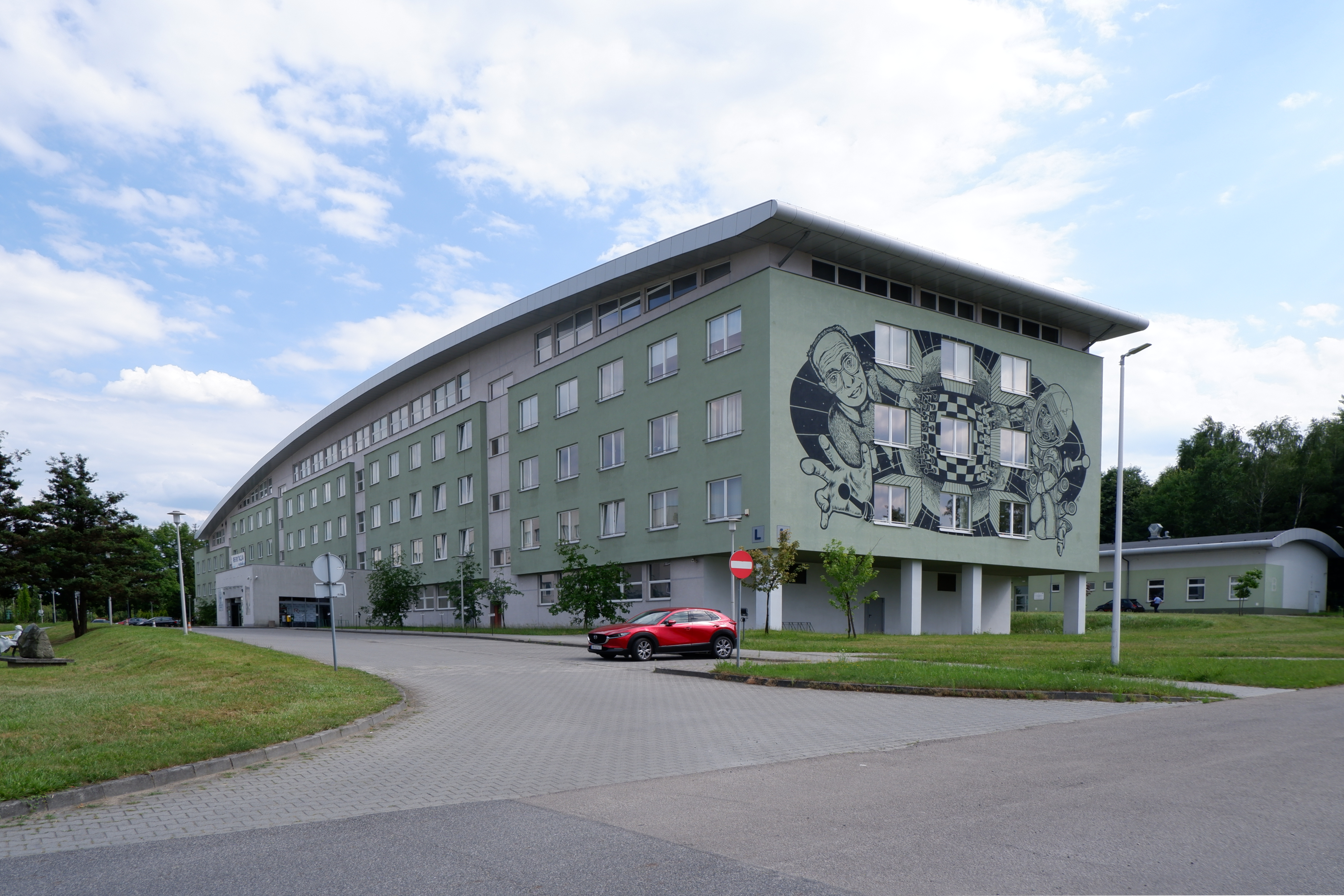
Main building on the campus

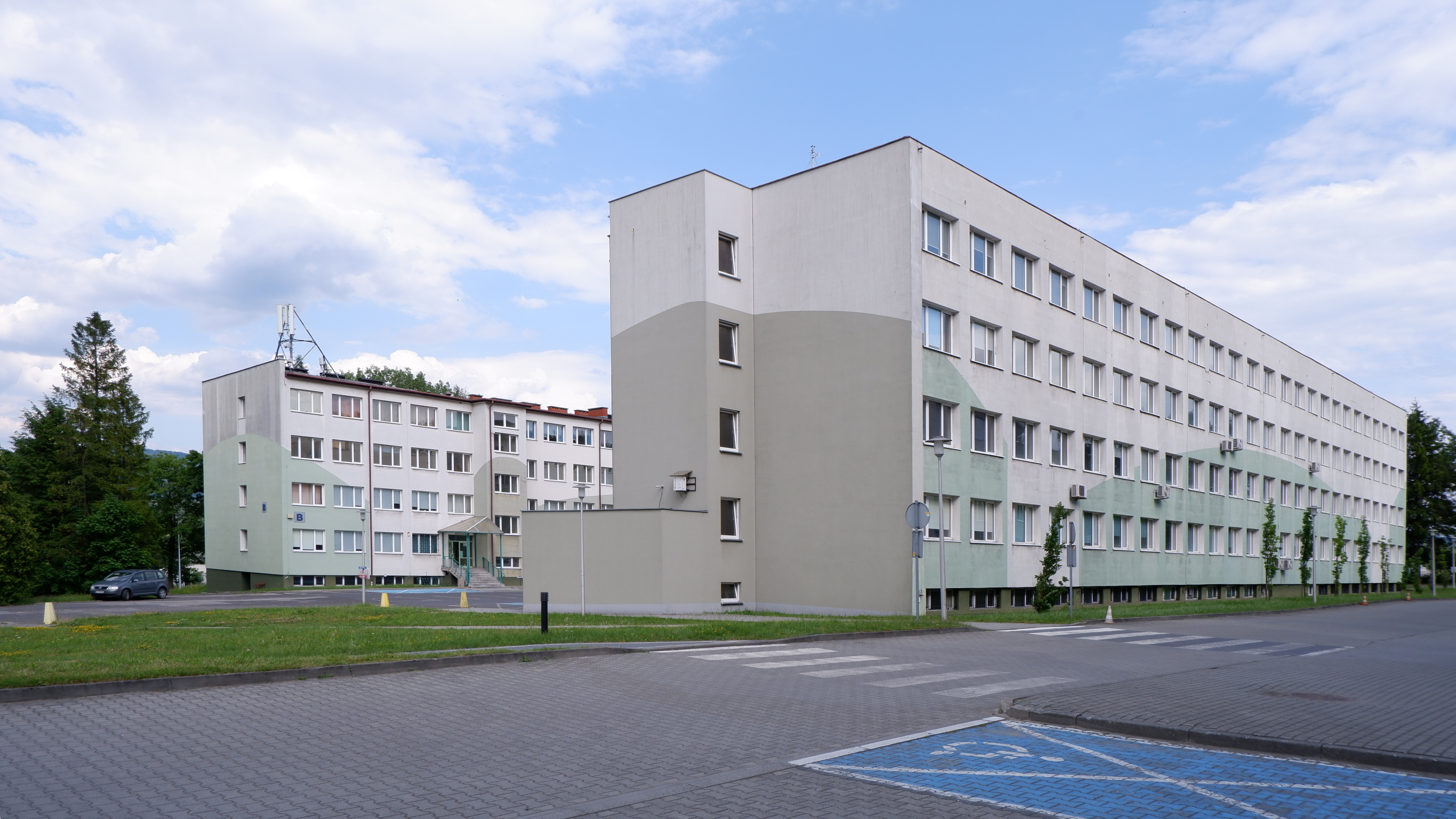
Another two buildings on the campus

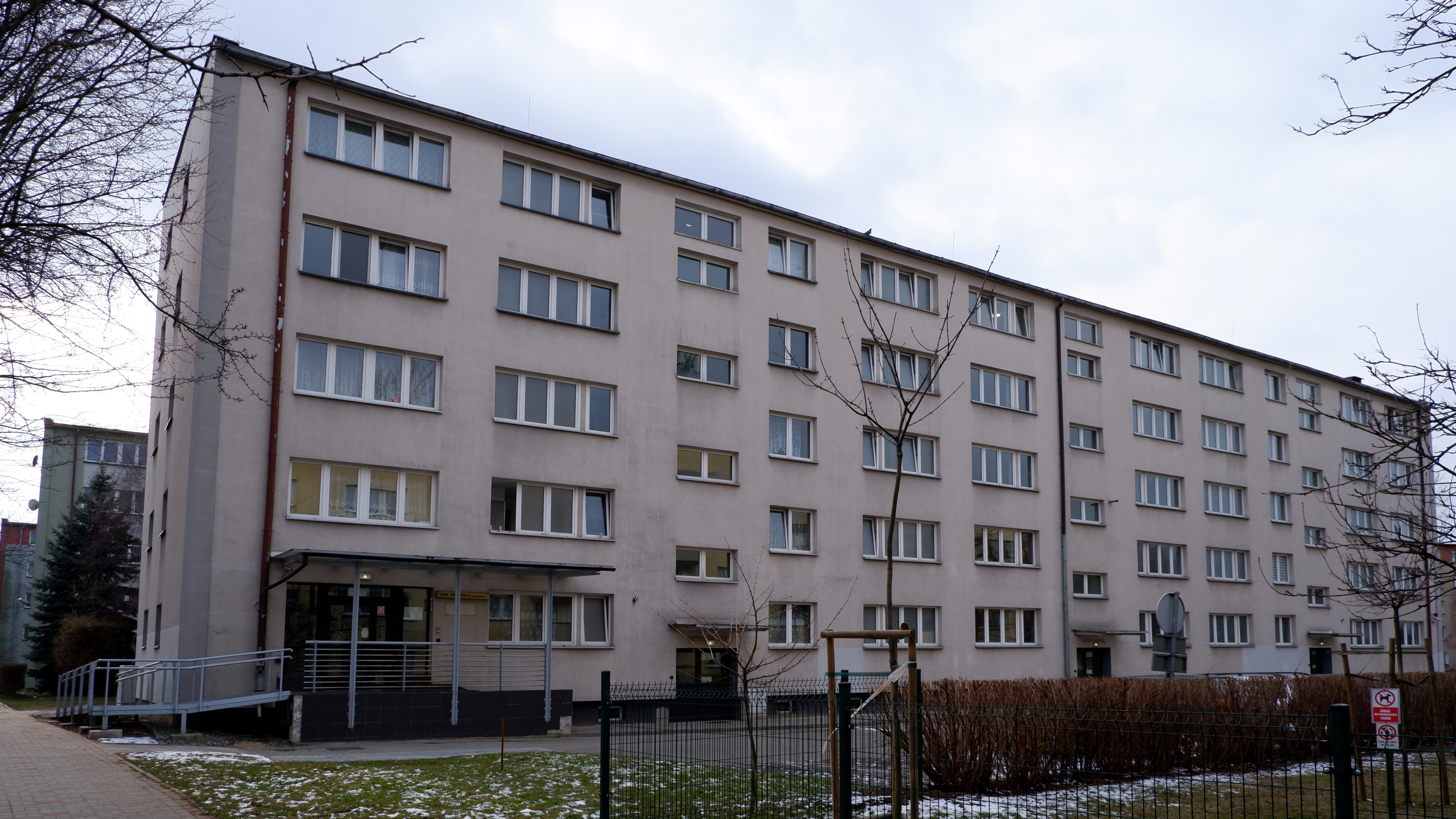
Dormitory

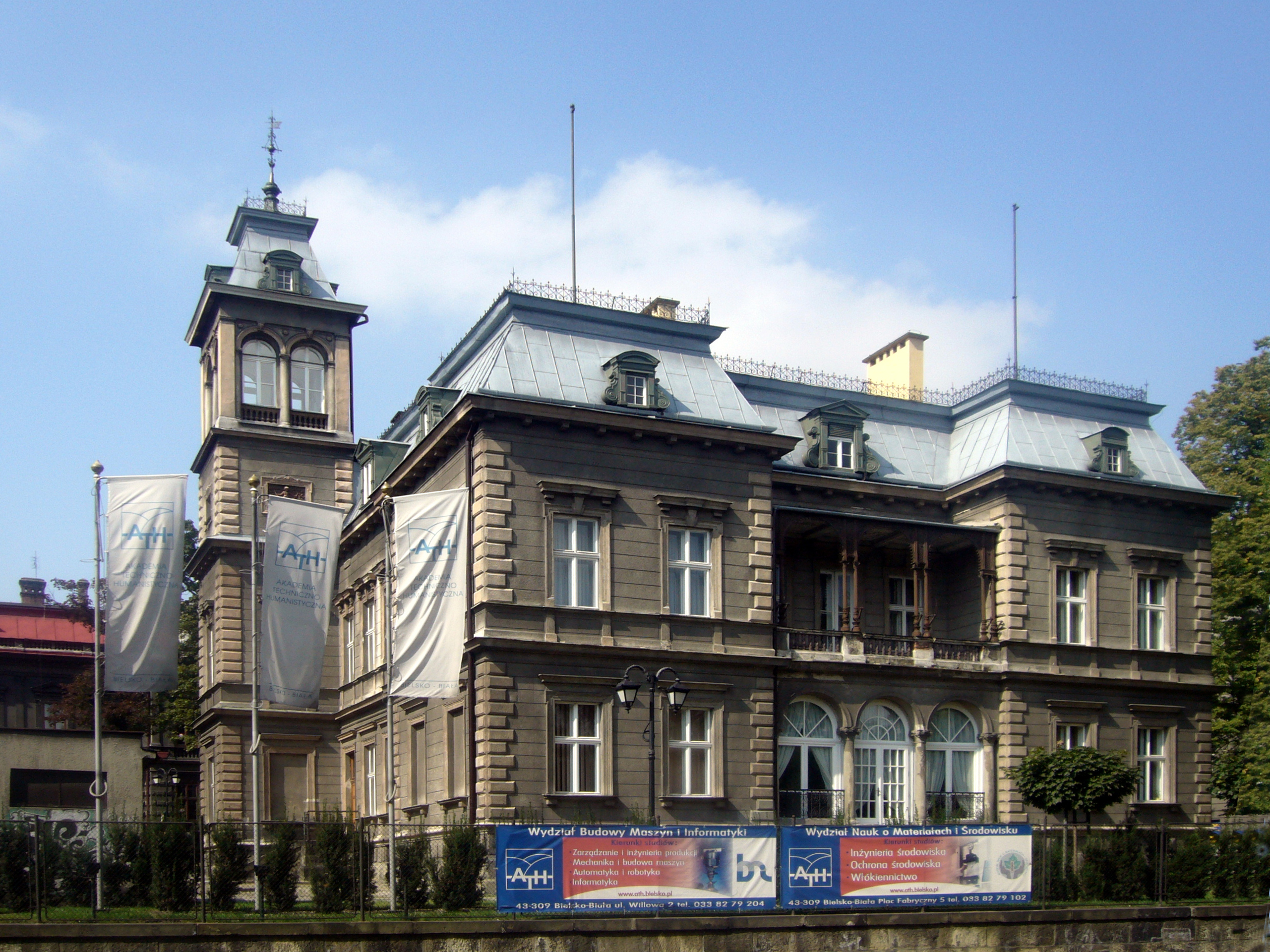
Villa Sixt as ATH rectorate (until 2012)

The University of Bielsko-Biała (Polish Uniwersytet Bielsko-Bialski (UBB in the logo and website)) is a university in Bielsko-Biała, Poland, established in 2001. It was previously part of the Technical University of Łódź.

== History ==
The University of Bielsko-Biała was founded in October 2001 as an independent government academic institution. Previously it was a branch of Łódź University of Technology, founded in 1969 at the request of the Bielsko-Biała industrial region.

== Student life ==
At present there are 10,000 students in the university. The machine-building, electrical and textile industries are traditional for the region, so the main courses of education have been long-established. As the economy changed, the university followed, developing new faculties such as Management, Environmental Protection, Information Sciences and Humanities.

The university employs an experienced academic staff: professors and other experts from the region, who deliver lectures and carry out research. The number of the academic staff is growing constantly. At present, it comprises about 350 people, including about 160 professors and doctors.

== Academics ==
The main educational and scientific core of the college consists of:

- Faculty of Mechanical Engineering and Information Sciences
- Faculty of Textile Engineering and Environmental Protection
- Faculty of Management and Information Sciences
- Faculty of Humanities and Social Sciences
- Faculty of Health Sciences

There are several inter-faculty units, including the Department of Foreign Languages, the Department of Physical Education and Sport, the Main Library and Centre of Postgraduate Studies and Vocational Training.

== Levels of study ==
- Licentiate (B.A. or B.Sc.)
- Master of Arts (M.A.) and Master of Sciences (M.Sc.)
- Advanced/postgraduate study
- Doctorate
- Higher/post doctorate (habilitatus)

== Ranking ==
In a survey conducted by the Polish edition of Newsweek in 2008, University of Bielsko-Biała was selected as the fifth best among all Polish universities.

== Region ==
Bielsko is at equal distance from Prague, Warsaw, and Vienna. It is also a popular tourist region. It is characteristic of the region that many foreign companies have their headquarters in the neighborhood of Bielsko-Biała. There are also many foreigners who work in the region. These students who can possibly take up a job in Poland or branch offices of foreign concerns can undergo such training here.

== See also ==
- List of colleges and universities
- Bielsko-Biała
