= Andrus Rõuk =

Estonian artist and poet (born 1957)

Andrus Rõuk (born 28 September 1957) is an Estonian artist and poet.

Rõuk was born in Tallinn. His poem "Silmades taevas ja meri" ("Sky and Sea in the Eyes") was published in the 9th issue of the literary journal Looming in 1981. It is an acrostic: the first letters of the verses read "SINIMUSTVALGE" ("blue-black-white"), the colours of the national flag of Estonia (at a time when Estonia was occupied and the use of national flag was forbidden; the Soviet flag of Estonia was mostly red with some blue and white). For this he was excluded from the Estonian State Institute of Arts (currently Estonian Academy of Arts).
