= Eat a Peach (autobiography) =

2020 autobiography of chef

- Author: David Chang
- Language: English
- Genre: Autobiography
- Publisher: Clarkson Potter
- Publication date: September 8, 2020
- Publication place: United States
- Media type: Hardcover
- Pages: 304
- ISBN: 9781524759216
- LC Class: TX714 .C463

Eat a Peach is a 2020 book by American chef and television personality David Chang.

== Reception ==
Kirkus Reviews described Chang as "no slouch as a writer, with a style that features a refreshingly defiant attitude and some of the best inessential footnotes since A Heartbreaking Work of Staggering Genius." Bill Addison of the Los Angeles Times describes the book as "a timely read on several levels" and "blunt, often funny, questioning and critical of himself and the world".

Eater's review of the book showed much more of the emotional burden of the book, writing: "Primarily, it wants to reframe Chang’s self-righteous anger, to bundle it up with his guilt, regrets, and ruminations, and to sell it back to the public as his pardon."
