= Ando (mobile app) =

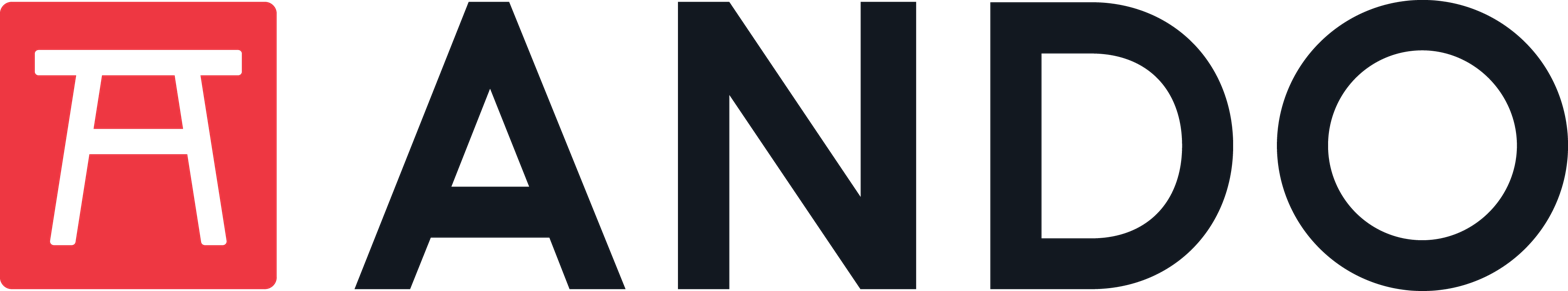
- Type: Online food ordering
- Founded: 2016
- Founder: David Chang
- Defunct: 2018
- Fate: acquired by Uber Eats
- Area served: Midtown and Downtown Manhattan, NYC

Ando was an online food delivery app that was created by David Chang.

== History ==
David Chang, Korean-American founder and chef of noodle restaurant chain Momofuku based out of New York City founded Ando in May 2016. Both companies were named after Momofuku Ando, the inventor of instant noodles.

The company began to be developed in 2013 in collaboration with Garrett Camp's startup accelerator Expa. The menu was designed by Chang and former WD-50 chef J.J Basil. It featured American cuisine like cheesesteaks, donuts and Milk Bar cookies. Ando has stated that its menu and food selection was "designed for delivery," meaning that it would keep well during long delivery times. Orders could accepted through the company's app, website or Seamless. The food was delivered by UberRUSH to the destination.

In November 2016, Ando secured $7 million in Series A funding to help expand delivery locations in New York City. Other angel investors include Jimmy Fallon and Aziz Ansari. Ando was acquired by Uber Eats in January 2018.
