= Andrus Poksi =

Estonian sailing coach and sport personnel

Andrus Poksi (born 8 August 1968) is an Estonian sailing official and sport personnel.

He was born in Tartu, Estonia. In 1993, he graduated from the University of Tartu's Institute of Physical Education "Cum Laude", specializing in physiotherapy.

From 1981 to 1990 he practised sailing, coached by Valdeko Säre. From 1989 to 1994 he practised basketball, coached by Arne Laos.

He has been an international sailing judge since 2006. From 2012 to 2013 he was the president of Estonian Yachting Union. Since 2010 he is the commodore of Tallinn Yacht Club.

- 2012 London Olympic Games – Member of International Jury;
- 2016 Rio Olympic Games – Member of International Jury;
- 2020 Tokyo Olympic Games – Member of International Jury;
- 2024 Paris Olympic Games – Vice Chairman of International Jury.
