= Andrus Eelmäe =

Estonian actor (born 1956)

- Born: 27 July 1956 (age 70); Pärnu, then part of Estonian SSR, Soviet Union
- Occupation: Actor
- Parents: Lembit Eelmäe (father); Herta Elviste (mother)

Andrus Eelmäe (born 27 July 1956) is an Estonian actor.

== Biography ==
He was born 27 July 1956 in Pärnu.

His parents are actors Lembit Eelmäe and Herta Elviste.

From 1975 to 1998 he worked at Vanemuine Theatre.

== Filmography ==
- "Kelgukoerad" (television series: role?)
- "Kättemaksukontor" (television series: role?)
- "Ühikarotid" (television series: role?)
- 2013 "Naabriplika" (television series; role: sacristan Viktor Kosar)
- 2015 "Vehkleja" (feature film; role?)
- 2016 "Savisaare protsess" (television series; role: boss of the department (Estonian: ametkonna boss))
