= Anti =

Anti may refer to:

== Arts, entertainment, media ==
- ANTI – Contemporary Art Festival, a yearly international live-art festival held in Kuopio, Finland
- Anti-ship (often shortened to just "anti"), a position held in Shipping discourse

=== Music ===
- Anti- (record label), an American independent record label
- Anti (album), by Rihanna, 2016
- Anti, an album by T. Raumschmiere, 2002
- Anti EP, an EP by Autechre, 1994
- "Anti" (song), by SOB X RBE, 2016

== Science and technology ==
- Antiparticle, a particle with the same mass but opposite charges in particle physics
- Anti addition, a type of bonding in organic chemistry
- Anti conformation, an arrangement of atoms in alkane stereochemistry
- ANTI (computer virus), a classic Mac OS computer virus

== People and characters ==
- Anti (given name), an Estonian masculine given name
- Anti, an Inca name for the Asháninka people
- A false reading of Nemty, the name of the ferryman who carried Isis to Set's island in Egyptian mythology

=== People with the surname ===
- Carlo Anti (1889–1961), Italian archaeologist
- Karen Anette Anti (born 1972), Norwegian Sami politician
- Michael Anti (sport shooter) (born 1964), American sport shooter
- Michael Anti (journalist) (born 1975), Chinese journalist and political blogger

== Other uses ==
- Áńt’į, or corpse powder, Navajo folkloric substance made from powdered corpses

== See also ==
- NT (disambiguation)
- Ant (disambiguation)
- Ante (disambiguation)
- Anth (disambiguation)
- Auntie (disambiguation)
- Opposition (disambiguation)
- Opposite (disambiguation)
- Counter (disambiguation)
- Against (disambiguation)
