= Opposite (disambiguation) =

Opposite, in semantics, is a word that means the reverse of a word

Opposite or opposites may also refer to:

== Music ==
- The Opposites, Dutch rap group
- Opposites (album), by Biffy Clyro, 2013
  - "Opposite" (song), 2013
- Opposites, a 2010 EP of remixes of Love and Its Opposite by Tracey Thorn
- "The Opposite", 1964 song by Johnny Burnette

== Other uses ==
- Opposite (leaf), an arrangement of two leaves on a stem
- Opposite (mathematics), the additive inverse of a number
- "The Opposite", a 1994 episode of TV series Seinfeld

== See also ==
- Anti (disambiguation)
- Contrary (disambiguation)
- Flipside (disambiguation)
- Inverse (disambiguation)
- Opposite sex (disambiguation)
- Opposition (disambiguation)
- Polar opposite (disambiguation)
- The House Opposite (disambiguation)
- Antinomy, opposites in a certain form from Kant
