= Opposition =

Opposition may refer to:

== Arts and media ==
- Opposition (Altars EP), 2011 EP by Christian metalcore band Altars
- The Opposition (band), a London post-punk band
- The Opposition with Jordan Klepper, a late-night television series on Comedy Central

== Politics ==
- Opposition (politics), a party with views opposing those of the current government
  - Loyal opposition
  - Parliamentary opposition, a form of political opposition
    - Leader of the Opposition

=== Opposition parties ===
- Opposition (Australia)
- Opposition (Queensland), Australia
- Ministerialists and Oppositionists (Western Australia)
- Bahraini opposition
- Official Opposition (Canada)
- Opposition (Croatia)
- Opposition Party (Hungary)
- Opposition Front Bench (Ireland)
- Opposition (Malaysia)
- Opposition (Montenegro)
- Official Opposition (New Zealand)
- His Majesty's Most Loyal Opposition (United Kingdom)

==== United States ====
- Opposition Party (Northern U.S.) (1854–1858), a Northern anti-slavery party absorbed by the Republican Party
- Opposition Party (Southern U.S.) (1858–1860), a Southern anti-secession party just before the Civil War
- Opposition Party (Illinois) (1874), a coalition opposing Republican Party rule in Chicago and Cook County

== Other uses ==
- Binary opposition, a pair of related terms that are opposite in meaning
- Opposition (boolean algebra), two terms with a shared literal, one positive, the other negative
- Opposition (chess), the position of the kings relative to each other
- Opposition (astronomy), the position of a celestial body
- Opposition (astrology), astrological aspect in horoscopic astrology
- Opposition proceeding, an administrative process available under some patent or trademark laws
- Opposition of the thumb, the location of the thumb opposite to the fingers so that the hand can grasp objects
- Square of opposition, a type of logic diagram

== See also ==
- Apposition (disambiguation)
- Iraqi opposition (disambiguation)
- Opposite (disambiguation)
- The Opponent (disambiguation)
