= Order of the Sun =

Order of the Sun may refer to:

- Order of the Sun (Peru) (1821–present), the highest award bestowed by the Republic of Peru to commend notable civil and military merit and the oldest civilian award in the Americas.
- Order of the Sun (India), a knighthood bestowed by the Maharaja of Jaipur
- Order of the Sun (Persia) (1873–1925), an honor or decoration of the Kadjar dynasty, which maintained order in the late-19th century region which is now known as Iran
- Most Brilliant Order of the Sun, one of the Orders, decorations, and medals of Namibia

== See also ==
- Order of the Rising Sun, Japan
