= Contrary =

Contrary may refer to:

- Contrary (comics), a character from Malibu Comics' Ultraverse
- Contrary (logic), the relationship between two propositions when they cannot both be true
- Contrary Magazine, a literary journal founded at the University of Chicago
- Contrary motion, in music theory
- Contrary (social role), in certain Amerindian cultures
- Contrary (venture capital firm), a San Francisco-based venture capital firm
- Little Miss Contrary, a Little Miss character

== See also ==
- Contrary Creek (disambiguation), several watercourses
- To the Contrary, PBS all-female news analysis series
- Opposite (disambiguation)
