= Supreme Court of India =

Highest court of jurisdiction in India

- Emblem of the Supreme Court of India

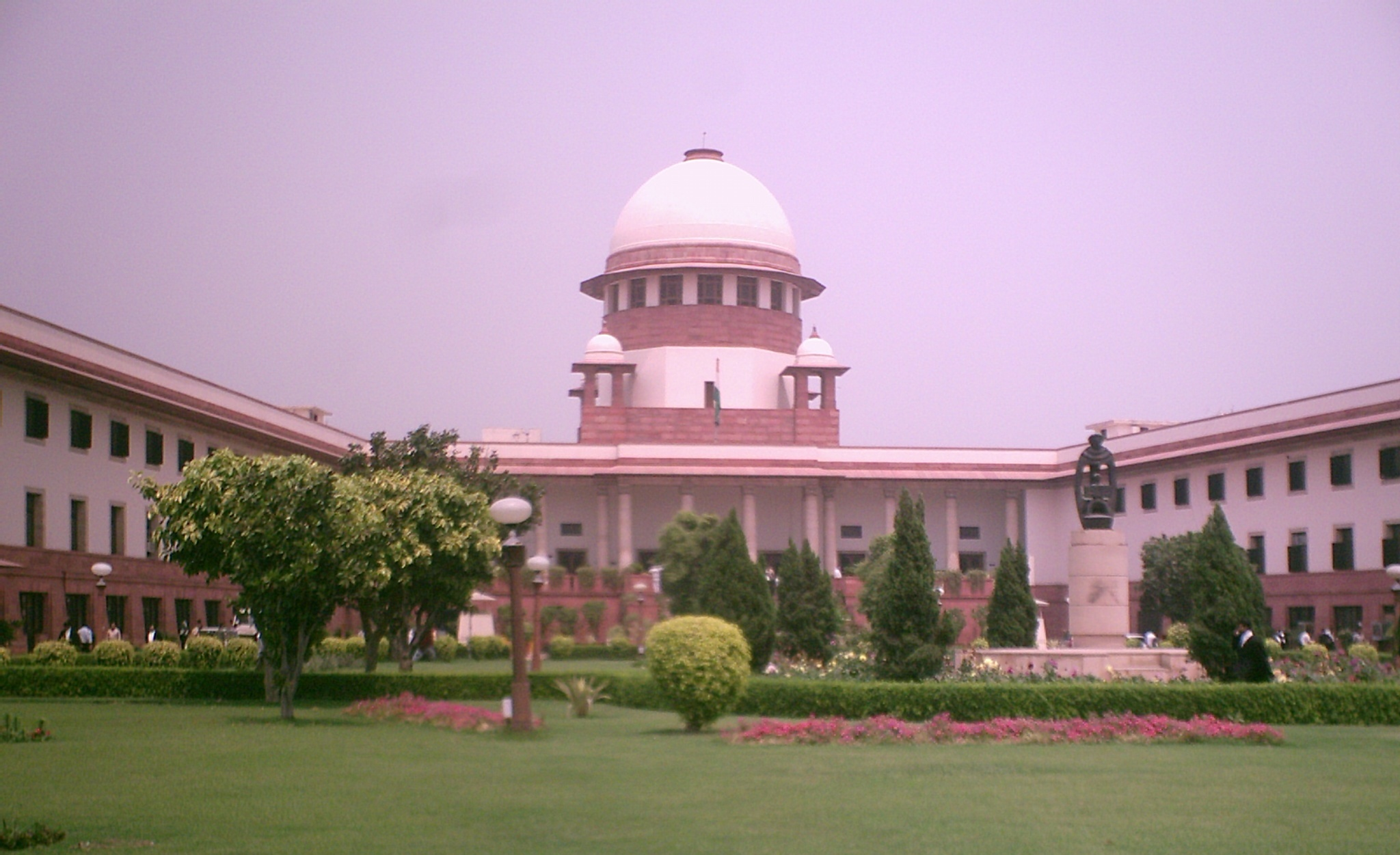
- Supreme Court building
- Interactive map of Supreme Court of India
- 28°37′21″N 77°14′22″E
- Established: 1 October 1937; 89 years ago
- Jurisdiction: India
- Location: Tilak Marg, New Delhi
- Coordinates: 28°37′21″N 77°14′22″E
- Motto: यतो धर्मस्ततो जयः Yatō Dharmastatō Jayaḥ "Where there is Dharma, there will be victory"
- Composition method: Collegium of the Supreme Court of India
- Authorised by: Article 124 of the Constitution of India
- Appeals from: High courts of India
- Judge term length: Mandatory retirement at 65 years of age
- Number of positions: 38 (incl. chief justice)
- Language: English, Hindi
- Website: www.sci.gov.in

Chief Justice of India
- Currently: Surya Kant
- Since: 24 November 2025
- Lead position ends: 9 February 2027

The Supreme Court of India is the supreme judicial authority and the highest court in India. It is the highest appellate court for all civil and criminal cases in India. The court is led by the Chief Justice of India and has a maximum sanctioned strength of 37 judges excluding the chief justice. It was established on 28 January 1950, two days after India became a republic, and replaced the Judicial Committee of the Privy Council and the Federal Court of India as the highest court of appeal. It has operated from the Supreme Court building in New Delhi since 1958. With expansive authority to initiate actions and wield appellate jurisdiction over all courts and the ability to invalidate amendments to the constitution, the Supreme Court of India is widely acknowledged as one of the most powerful supreme courts in the world.

Established under the Constitution of India, the Supreme Court has extensive powers in the form of original, appellate and advisory jurisdictions. As the apex constitutional court, it takes up appeals primarily against verdicts of the High Courts of various states and tribunals. As an advisory court, it hears matters which are referred by the president of India. It also has the power of judicial review, in which the court invalidates both ordinary laws as well as constitutional amendments as per the basic structure doctrine that it developed in the 1960s and 1970s.

As mandated by the Constitution, the Supreme Court is required to safeguard the fundamental rights of citizens and to settle legal disputes among the central government and various state governments. Its decisions are binding on other Indian courts as well as the union and state governments. As per the Article 142 of the constitution, the court has the inherent jurisdiction to pass any order deemed necessary in the interest of complete justice which becomes binding on the president to enforce.

== History ==
In 1861, the British parliament enacted the Indian High Courts Act and the Indian Councils Act, which abolished the existing Supreme Courts in Calcutta, Madras, and Bombay and the Sadr Diwani Adalats, and gave power to the British Crown to establish High Courts in India. Three charter High Courts were established in the three cities which earlier had Supreme Courts, by the letters patent granted by the British Crown on 26 June 1862. These High Courts were the highest courts for all cases in the respective regions under their jurisdiction until the creation of the Federal Court of India under the Government of India Act 1935. The Federal Court had the jurisdiction to hear appeals against judgements of the High Courts, and solve disputes between the various provinces of the British Raj and later between the federal states and provinces after Indian independence in August 1947.

The Supreme Court of India came into existence on 26 January 1950 after the adoption of the Constitution of India. The first chief justice of India was H. J. Kania. It replaced the Federal Court and the Judicial Committee of the Privy Council, which were then at the apex of the Indian court system. The first proceedings and inauguration took place at 9:45 am on 28 January 1950, when the judges took their seats, and the date is thus regarded as the official date of establishment of the Supreme Court.

The Supreme Court initially had its seat at the Chamber of Princes in the Parliament House where the Federal Court sat from 1937 to 1950. In 1958, the Supreme Court moved to its present premises. Originally, the Constitution envisaged a Supreme Court with a chief justice and seven judges, and granted the power to increase the capacity to the Parliament of India. In its formative years, the Supreme Court met from 10 am to 12 pm and then from 2 pm to 4 pm for 28 days per month.

== Jurisdiction and powers ==
The Supreme Court of India was constituted and is granted the required jurisdiction and powers as per Chapter IV of Part V of the Constitution of India titled "The Union Judiciary". It is the foremost appellate court in India, and the law declared by the Supreme Court is binding on all courts in the country.

Jurisdiction and powers of the Supreme Court as per the Constitution of India
Article	Description
Article 124	Constitution and establishment of the Supreme Court
Article 129	Declaration of Supreme Court as the Court of Record
Article 131	Authorisation of original jurisdiction of the Supreme Court
Articles 132, 133 and 134	Authorisation of appellate jurisdiction of the Supreme Court
Article 135	Power of the Federal Court granted to the Supreme Court
Article 136	Special leave to appeal to the Supreme Court
Article 137	Review power of the Supreme Court
Article 138	Enlargement of the jurisdiction of the Supreme Court
Article 139	Powers of the Supreme Court to issue certain writs
Article 140	Ancillary powers of the Supreme Court
Article 141	Law-making power of the Supreme Court
Article 142	Power to pass any decree or order to do "complete justice" in any cause or matter pending before the Supreme Court

Article 145 of the Constitution grants the Supreme Court the authority to create its own rules, subject to presidential approval, to govern the practice and procedure of the Court. These rules have been revised and published three times, in 1950, 1966, and 2013.

=== Review petition ===
Article 137 of the Constitution grants the Supreme Court the authority to reevaluate its own decisions. The Supreme Court can review any judgment or order it has previously pronounced. This power is subject to any laws created by Parliament and other rules established under Article 145. However, no application for review is to be entertained in a civil proceeding except on certain grounds as per the Code of Civil Procedure. Additionally, the Supreme Court holds the ability to invalidate parliamentary and governmental decisions if they violate fundamental features. Additionally, it can overturn the impeachment process of the president and the judges, as decided by the parliament, based on constitutional validity or fundamental features.

=== Powers to punish for contempt ===
Under Articles 129 and 142 of the Constitution, the Supreme Court has been vested with the power to punish anyone for contempt of any court in India, including itself. In May 2006, it directed a sitting minister in the Government of Maharashtra to serve a one-month prison term for contempt of court.

== Court building ==
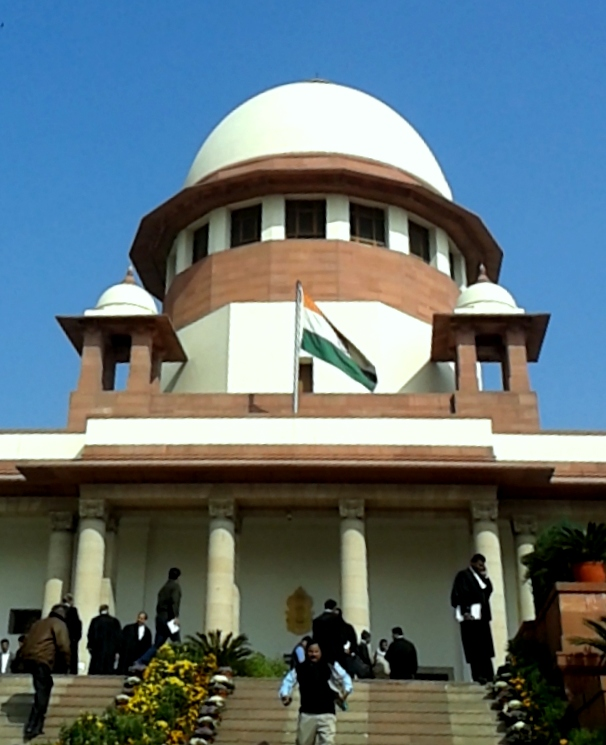
Central Wing of the Court

The court building is shaped to symbolise the scales of justice with a central wing flanked by a wing on either side. These two wings act as the two limbs of the balance and end with two semi-circular hooks that represent the pans of the balance, and the centres of the two semi-circular pans connect to a centrally placed statue of "Mother and Child" in the garden.

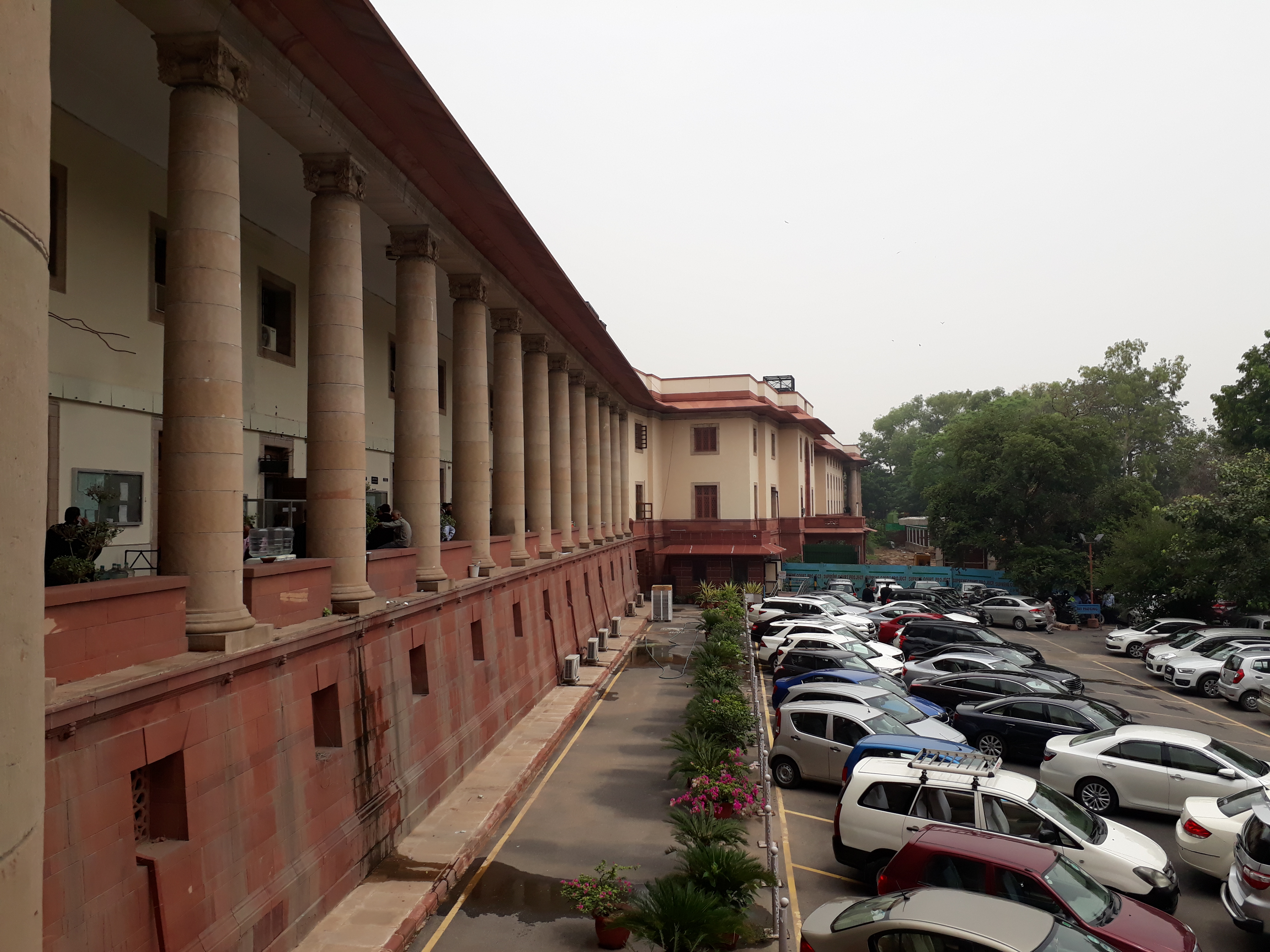
Side view of the Supreme Court building

The central wing consists of the chief justice's court, the largest of the courtrooms, flanked by two court halls on either side. It has a 27.6 m (91 ft) high dome and a spacious colonnaded verandah. The right wing of the building houses the Bar, the offices of the Attorney General and other law officers, and the library of the court. The left wing houses the offices of the court. There are 15 courtrooms located in various parts of the building.

The foundation stone of the building was laid on 29 October 1954 by Rajendra Prasad, the first President of India. The main block of the building was built on a triangular plot of land measuring 17 acres (6.9 ha). It is designed in the Indo-British architectural style by Ganesh Bhikaji Deolalikar, the first Indian to head the Central Public Works Department. The design of scales of justice was to conform to this triangular site and according to Prasad was the conception of justice for Indians. The court moved into the building in 1958. In 1979, two wings were added to the complex, and they were further extended in 1994.

The court premises also host legal aid, the Supreme Court museum, court-fee vendors, and other services such as medical and emergency services, a rail reservation counter, a canteen, a post office and banks.

=== Mother and Child sculpture ===
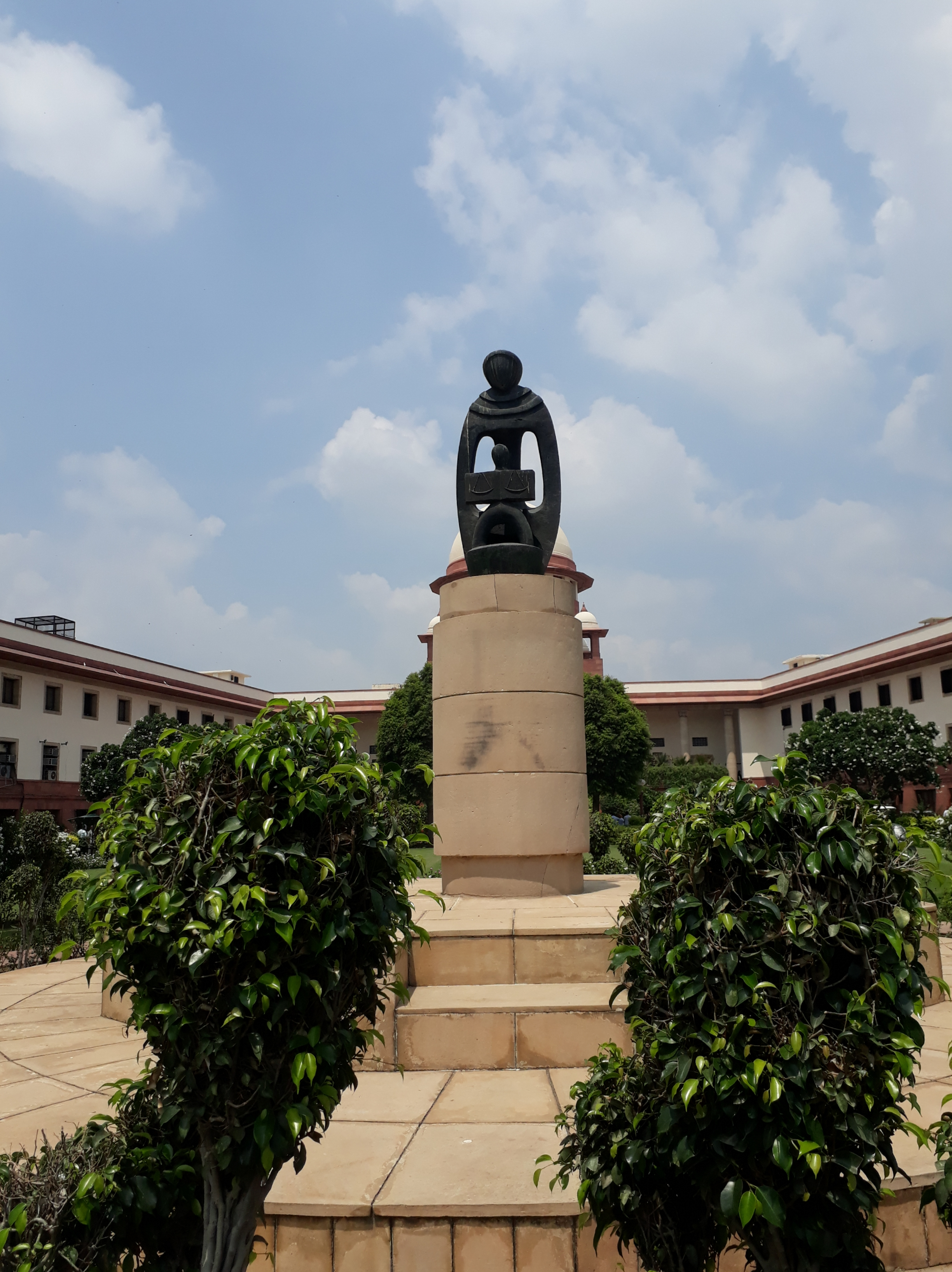
Mother and Child sculpture

On 20 February 1978, a 210 cm (83 in) high bronze sculpture of "Mother and Child" was installed in the lawn of the court building. It was designed by Chintamoni Kar, who described the statue as "Mother India sheltering the young republic represented by the symbol of a child upholding the law of the country shown in the form of an open book, with the symbol of the balance representing law and justice". The official court account states that it represents a "dispensation of equal justice to all". The sculpture is located at the center of the park on the lawn of the court beside the statue of Mahatma Gandhi, which is in front of the staircase of the central wing in the front lawn.

When the statue was installed in 1978, there were protests by a section of advocates of the court demanding its removal. A memorandum was submitted to the then law minister Shanti Bhushan, which stated that "the statue is supposedly a symbol and inspiration for the highest institution of justice, the Supreme Court….The child is nondescript, but the mother's resemblance to Mrs. Indira Gandhi is discernible even to the ordinary eye not trained for appreciating the nuances of sculpture". As the statue was put up in the post-emergency period, they contended that it is symbolic of perversity and is based on the theme of the mother-and-son cult built up during the period. Other statements from advocates included, "It's like Indira mothering the judges and telling them you practise justice like I tell you to", and "symbolizing justice is terribly conservative as justice is constantly changing". Later on, as it was clarified that the model was made in the year 1969, the advocates submitted an apology and withdrew the protests.

=== Nyay Devi statue ===
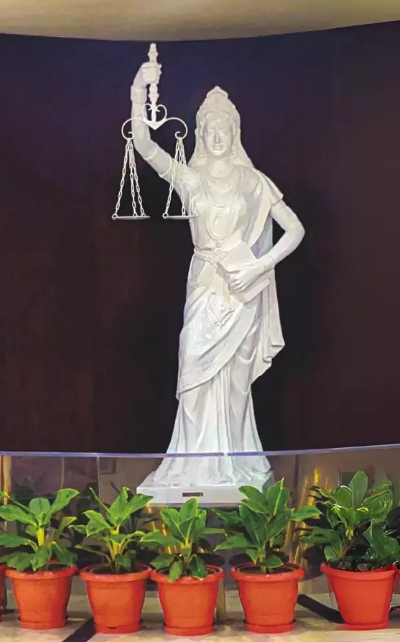
Nyay Devi

In October 2024, a new statue of Nyay Devi (Lady Justice) was unveiled in the court premises by the then chief justice Dhananjaya Y. Chandrachud, replacing the earlier statue of Lady Justice.

The new statue had no blindfolds as depicted in the older statue, and held a book in her left hand in lieu of the sword, along with the addition of Indian attire. She wears a sari, has a crown atop her head, with a bindi on her forehead and Indian jewellery on her ears and neck. She holds the scales of justice in her right hand and a book in her left hand that symbolizes the Constitution of India. Although the statue was initially proposed to be cast in bronze, it was later made of fiberglass owing to time constraints.

== Insignia ==
=== Seal ===
Emblem of the Supreme Court

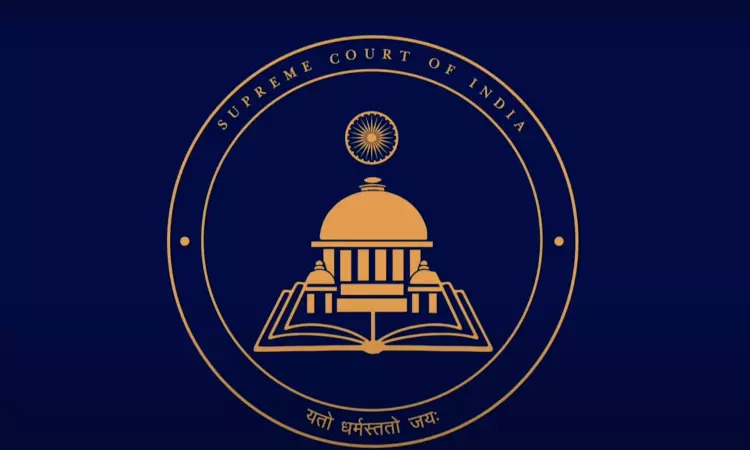
Flag of the Supreme Court with a new emblem, used briefly in 2024

The Court's seal consists of a wheel with 32 spokes atop an adaptation from the Sarnath Lion Capital of Ashoka. The inscription "यतो धर्मस्ततो जयः" (IAST: Yato Dharmastato Jayaḥ) in Sanskrit, meaning "whence justice (dharma), thence victory", is embellished below it. The wheel symbolises righteousness, encompassing truth, goodness and equity.

=== Flag ===
On 1 September 2024, the Supreme Court unveiled a flag for the Court's use, combining elements of the seal and the court's architecture. The deep blue-coloured flag depicts the Ashoka Chakra set above the rotunda of the Court, on a book depicting the Constitution. It was unveiled by President Droupadi Murmu on 1 September 2024, commemorating the 75th anniversary of the Supreme Court. The flag and insignia were designed by the National Institute of Fashion Technology, Delhi. However, when B. R. Gavai took over as the chief justice, the court reverted to its original logo based on the Saranath Lion Pillar in 2025.

== Composition ==
The Supreme Court consists of the judges appointed to the Court and the associated officers.

=== Judges ===
When adopted in 1950, the Constitution provided for a Supreme Court with eight judges including a chief justice, who heads the court. In the early years, a full bench of the Supreme Court sat together to hear the cases presented before them. As the work of the Court increased and cases began to accumulate, the Parliament enacted laws to increase the number of judges from the original eight in 1950 to 11 in 1956, 14 in 1960, 18 in 1978, 26 in 1986, 31 in 2009, 34 in 2019, to 38 in 2026. As the number of the judges increased, they sat in smaller division benches of two or three judges for normal cases. A larger bench of five or more, referred to as a constitution bench, is constituted when required to settle fundamental questions of law. A bench may refer a case before it to a larger bench, should the need arise. The largest-ever bench was constituted in 1973 in the case of Kesavananda Bharati v. State of Kerala, where a bench of 13 judges was set up to decide whether the Parliament had the unfettered right to amend the Constitution.

==== Eligibility ====
As defined in Article 124 of the Indian Constitution, a citizen of India not exceeding 65 years of age who has been:

- a judge of one High Court or more (continuously), for at least five years;
- an advocate there, for at least ten years;
- a distinguished jurist, in the opinion of the president;

is eligible to be recommended for appointment as a judge of the Supreme Court.

==== Appointments ====
A judge is appointed to the Supreme Court by the president on the recommendation of the collegium – a closed group composed of the Chief Justice of India, the four most senior judges of the court and the senior-most judge hailing from the High Court of a prospective appointee. Earlier, judges used to be appointed by the president on the advice of the union cabinet. The collegium system was evolved by the Supreme Court on the basis of the Three Judges Cases (1981, 1993, and 1998). Under this system, the executive cannot directly suggest any names to the president, and the president ultimately decides on appointing the judges only from a list of names recommended only by the collegium. However, as held in the judgments, the executive was given the power to reject a recommended name.

The collegium system has come under criticism from certain quarters over the years. The consensus within the collegium is at times achieved through trade-offs, resulting in unreliable appointments with consequences for litigants. Sycophancy and lobbying within the system are prevalent, and Justice Jasti Chelameswar claimed that in one case, "a judge was blocked from elevation from the Madras High Court in 2009, in what 'appeared to have been a joint venture in the subversion of the law governing the collegium system by both the executive and the judiciary'".

In 2015, the Parliament passed a law to replace the collegium with a National Judicial Appointments Commission. However, the law was struck down as unconstitutional by the Supreme Court, as the new system would undermine the independence of the judiciary. Restoring the old system of the collegium, the court invited suggestions, from the executive and the general public, on recommendations to improve the collegium system, broadly along the lines of – setting up eligibility criteria for appointments, a permanent secretariat to help the collegium sift through material on potential candidates, infusing more transparency into the selection process, grievance redressal and any other suggestion not in these four categories, like transfer of judges. This resulted in the court asking the government and the collegium to finalize the memorandum of procedure incorporating the above.

In 2009, a challenge arose in the Supreme Court regarding the recommendation for the appointment of a High Court judge made by the collegium of that specific court. The court asserted that the eligibility to become a judge was a factual matter, open to questioning by any individual. On the contrary, the determination of who should become a judge was deemed a matter of opinion and was beyond questioning. The court emphasised that, as long as a thorough consultation occurred within the collegium to form this opinion, the content or material considered in shaping the opinion was not subject to scrutiny in a court of law.

==== Tenure and emoluments ====
Judges of the Supreme Court conclude their service mandatorily upon reaching the age of 65. There have been proposals advocating for the implementation of a predetermined tenure for judges, including the chief justice. As per Article 125 of the Constitution, the Parliament is responsible for determining the salary, and other emoluments of the judges. However, the Parliament is not allowed to alter any of these privileges or rights to the judges' disadvantage after their appointment. A judge of the Supreme Court draws a basic salary of ₹250,000 (US$2,700) per month, equivalent to the Cabinet Secretary – the senior-most civil servant of the Indian government, and a chief justice earns a basic salary of ₹280,000 (US$3,000) per month.

==== Oath or affirmation ====
As per Article 124 and Third Schedule of the Constitution, a judge of the Supreme Court is required to make and subscribe in the presence of the president an oath or affirmation:

That I will bear true faith and allegiance to the Constitution of India as by law established, that I will uphold the sovereignty and integrity of India, that I will duly and faithfully and to the best of my ability, knowledge and judgement, perform the duties of my office without fear or favour, affection or ill-will and that I will uphold the Constitution and the laws.

==== Removal ====
As per Article 124(4) of the Constitution, the president can remove a judge on the grounds of proved misbehavior or incapacity when the Parliament approves with a majority of the total membership of each house in favour of impeachment and not less than two-thirds of the members of each house present. For initiating impeachment proceedings against a judge, at least 50 members of Rajya Sabha or 100 members of Lok Sabha shall issue the notice as per the Judges (Inquiry) Act of 1968. Post the notice, a judicial committee would be formed to frame charges against the judge, to conduct a fair trial and to submit a report to the Parliament. When the judicial committee report finds the judge guilty of misbehaviour or incapacity, further removal proceedings would be taken up by the Parliament if the judge does not resign. A judge, upon proven guilty, is also liable for punishment per applicable laws or for contempt of the Constitution by breaching the oath under the Prevention of Insults to National Honour Act, 1971.

==== Post-retirement ====
A person who has retired as a judge of the Supreme Court is debarred from practising in any court of law or before any other authority in India. However, the Supreme Court and High Court judges can be appointed to tribunals and commissions, after their retirement. The appointment of judges to such posts after their retirement has drawn criticism from legal figures including former law minister Arun Jaitley as it puts into question the judicial independence and impartiality of the judges.

==== Demographics ====
I am proud to be an Indian. India is the only country where a member of the minority Parsi community with a population of 167,000, like myself, can aspire to attain the post of the Chief Justice of India. These things do not happen in our neighbouring countries.

— S. H. Kapadia, former Chief Justice of India

In practice, the judges of the Supreme Court have been selected so far mostly from amongst judges of the High Courts. Only nine judges–Sarv Mittra Sikri, Subimal Chandra Roy, Kuldip Singh, Santosh Hegde, Rohinton Fali Nariman, Uday U. Lalit, L. Nageswara Rao, Indu Malhotra, P. S. Narasimha and K. V. Viswanathan—have been appointed to the Supreme Court directly from the bar. Fathima Beevi was the first female judge of the Supreme Court, and was sworn into office in 1989. In 1968, Mohammad Hidayatullah became the first Muslim to become the chief justice. In 2007, K. G. Balakrishnan became the first judge and chief justice from the Dalit community. In 2010, S. H. Kapadia, from the Parsi community, became the chief justice. In 2017, Jagdish Singh Khehar became the first Sikh to become the chief justice.

=== Registry ===
The registry of the Supreme Court is headed by the secretary-general, who is assisted by ten registrars, and several additional and deputy registrars. Article 146 of the constitution details the appointments of officers and servants of the Supreme Court registry.

=== Bar ===
The Supreme Court rules established in 2013 entitle only those advocates who are registered with the Supreme Court, known as Advocate-on-Record to appear, act and plead for a party in the Court. Those advocates who are designated as senior counsel by the Supreme Court or any of the High Courts can appear for the clients along with an advocate-on-record. Any other advocate can appear for a party along with or under instructions from an advocate-on-record.

== Judicial independence ==
The Constitution seeks to ensure the independence of Supreme Court judges in various ways. Per Article 50 of Directive Principles of State Policy, the state shall take steps to separate the judiciary from the executive. Independence of the judiciary, the supremacy of the constitution and rule of law are the features of the basic structure of the Constitution. The Court has, over the years, developed a reputation for independence from the executive, a principle now entrenched in the Constitution's basic structure.

One of the main functions of the Supreme Court is to decide constitutional issues. The Supreme Court is empowered to frame suo moto cases without receiving formal petitions or complaints. The Supreme Court is entrusted with extensive powers to enforce the fundamental rights detailed in the Constitution. The Article 38 (1) of the Constitution of India lays down a set of Directive Principles, which are rules to be followed by "the State". Article 12 states that "the State shall strive to promote the welfare of the people by securing a social order in which social, economic and political justice is animated/informed in all institutions of life." While "the State" includes the Government and all other authorities within India, there have been several extended interpretations of the term by various judgements of the Supreme Court, including contrary judgements by the Supreme Court itself on whether the judiciary is part of it. While these principles cannot be enforced by the Court directly, the Supreme Court has ruled that it cannot contradict or take away the fundamental rights, and stepped in when there has been a conflict.

== Operations ==
The Supreme Court works from 10:30 am to 4 pm, and is closed for two weeks each during the summer and the winter. In an interview in June 2018, judge Chelameswar revealed that most Supreme Court judges worked around 14 hours per day, and continue to work for an average of seven hours per day even during vacations. He further said that the Supreme Court of the United States delivers judgement on around 120 cases in a year, while each judge in the Supreme Court of India delivers judgements on 1,000–1,500 cases.

As laid down on 5 February 2018, the Supreme Court adopted a roster system for assigning cases to judges. According to this arrangement, the chief justice is designated to preside over all special leave petitions and cases concerning public interest, social justice, elections, arbitration, criminal matters, and more. Other members of the collegium or senior judges are tasked with hearing cases related to labour disputes, taxation, compensation, consumer protection, maritime law, mortgage, personal law, family law, land acquisition, service, company matters, and other relevant areas.

== Reporting ==
Supreme Court Reports is the official journal that reports the decisions of the Supreme Court. It is published under the authority of the Supreme Court by the controller of publications of the Indian government. In addition, there are other private journals that report Supreme Court cases. In 2023, the court adopted a neutral citation system for identifying and citing cases in a uniform fashion. The citation is formatted as <YEAR><COURT><SERIAL>, 2023INSC1 for example, referring to judgement 1 of 2023 by the Indian Supreme Court (INSC).

In July 2026, following the remarks by the Chief Justice of India that blamed the media for misreporting his views, the Supreme Court passed an interim order prohibiting the extraction, editing, dissemination, reposting, uploading, or monetisation of audio or video recordings of judicial proceedings on social media and other digital platforms without prior permission.

== Landmark judgments ==
=== Fundamental rights ===
The Parliament passed the first amendment to the constitution in 1951, and the fourth amendment in 1955, which gave it authority to redistribute land owned by zamindars. In 1967, the Supreme Court ruled in Golaknath v. State of Punjab that the Parliament did not have the power to abrogate the fundamental rights including the provisions on private property. In 1971, the 25th amendment to the constitution curtailed the right of a citizen to property as a fundamental right and permitted the acquisition of private property by the government for public use, on the payment of compensation which would be determined by the Parliament and not the courts.

In the Kesavananda Bharati v. State of Kerala case in 1973, popularly known as fundamental rights case, a 13-judge bench of the Supreme Court, in a 7-6 decision, asserted its right to strike down amendments to the Constitution that were in violation of the fundamental architecture of the Constitution and formed a Basic structure doctrine. The decision later led to the government enacting the 42nd amendment of the constitution, which sought to curtail the powers of the Supreme Court and judge A. N. Ray, who was among the dissenters, being favored for the post of the chief justice, superseding three senior judges–J. M. Shelat, A. N. Grover and K. S. Hegde, who were among those who wrote the favorable judgement. The Supreme Court later rejected the 42nd amendment and reaffirmed the basic structure doctrine, created in the fundamental rights case, in the Minerva Mills v. Union of India case in 1980.

In the Maneka Gandhi v. Union of India case, the Supreme Court significantly expanded the interpretation of Article 21 of the constitution. The Court overruled its verdict on the A. K. Gopalan v. State of Madras case, which had held that fundamental rights were exclusive and independent of each other. Instead, the Court established that Articles 14, 19, and 21 were interlinked, forming what is known as the 'golden triangle' of the constitution. In the I.R. Coelho v. State of Tamil Nadu case in January 2007, a bench of nine judges gave a unanimous verdict reaffirming the basic structure doctrine, and held that a constitutional amendment which entails violation of any fundamental rights which the court regards as forming part of the doctrine can be struck down depending upon its impact and consequences. It further asserted the power of the Supreme Court to review amendments that are included in the Ninth schedule of the constitution to escape judicial scrutiny, if it is found to violate the basic doctrine established in 1973.

=== The Emergency ===
The independence of the judiciary was severely curtailed during the Emergency period (1975–77) imposed by Indira Gandhi. The constitutional rights of imprisoned persons were restricted under preventive detention laws passed by the parliament. In the case of Additional District Magistrate of Jabalpur v. Shiv Kant Shukla, popularly known as the Habeas Corpus case, a bench of five judges of the Supreme Court ruled in favour of the state's right to unrestricted powers of detention during the Emergency, holding that the rights to life, liberty and equality did not exist during an emergency proclamation. Judges A.N. Ray, P. N. Bhagwati, Y. V. Chandrachud, and M.H. Beg, stated in the majority decision:

(under the declaration of emergency) no person has any locus to move any writ petition under Art. 226 before a High Court for habeas corpus or any other writ or order or direction to challenge the legality of an order of detention.

The only dissenting opinion was from H. R. Khanna, who stated:

detention without trial is an anathema to all those who love personal liberty... A dissent is an appeal to the brooding spirit of the law, to the intelligence of a future day, when a later decision may possibly correct the error into which the dissenting judge believes the court to have been betrayed.

In January 1977, Khanna was superseded for the position of chief justice despite being the most senior judge at the time as the government broke the convention of appointing the senior most judge to the position of chief justice of India for the second time after the earlier instance in 1973. Khanna is said to have remarked earlier that the judgment in the Habeas Corpus case was likely to cost him the position.

During the Emergency, the government passed the 38th amendment to the Constitution, which sought to limit judicial review for the election of the prime minister and only a body constituted by the parliament could review this election. Subsequently, the Parliament, with most opposition members in jail during the emergency, passed the 42nd amendment which prevented any court from reviewing any amendment to the constitution with the exception of procedural issues concerning ratification. After the emergency, subsequent amendments made it difficult to declare and sustain an emergency, and reinstated much of the power to the Supreme Court. The Supreme Court later rejected the absoluteness of the 42nd amendment and reaffirmed its power of judicial review and the basic structure doctrine.

The Supreme Court's creative and expansive interpretations of Article 21 (life and personal liberty) of the constitution, after the emergency period, gave rise to a new jurisprudence of public interest litigations that has promoted economic and social rights.

=== Reservation ===
Reservation for socially and educationally backward classes in educational institutions and government jobs were introduced in various stages since the Indian independence as per articles 15 and 46 of the constitution. Significant changes happened with the implementation of Mandal Commission recommendations in the 1980s. In the Indra Sawhney & Others v. Union of India case in 1992, the Supreme Court ruled that reservations in job promotions are "unconstitutional" or not in accordance with the political constitution but allowed its continuation for five years. It also stipulated that reservations could not exceed 50 percent, anything above which it judged would violate equal access as guaranteed by the Constitution. In 1995, the 77th amendment to the constitution was made before the five-year period expired to continue with caste based reservations in jobs. In the Ashoka Kumar Thakur v. Union of India case in 2006, the Supreme Court upheld the constitutional validity of the introduction of reservations in central educational institutions, subject to the "creamy layer" criteria.

Over the years, the Supreme Court has often stuck down attempts by various states to introduce additional reservations or create sub-quotas based on casts or religion. However, there have been exceptions, such as in the state of Tamil Nadu, where the Court has allowed caste-based reservation up to 69 percent as 89% of the population were eligible for reservations. On 7 November 2022, the Supreme Court by a 3:2 verdict in the Janhit Abhiyan vs Union Of India case, upheld the validity of the 103rd constitutional amendment carried out to provide ten percent reservation for the economically weaker sections from unreserved classes for admission in educational institutions and government jobs. It held that the 50% cap on quota is not inviolable and affirmative action on economic basis may go a long way in eradicating caste-based reservation. On 1 August 2024, the Supreme Court ruled 6:1 in favor of permitting states to create sub-quotas for based on caste within their reservation schemes.

=== Elections ===
In the 1980s, Electronic Voting Machines (EVM) were developed for voting in Indian elections and was introduced in a phased manner by the Election Commission of India. The EVMs were first trialed in May 1982 in the by-election to Paravur assembly constituency in Kerala in a limited number of polling stations. In a ruling on a case filed against the usage of EVMs in the by-election, the Supreme Court ruled that the Representation of People Act, 1951 and the Conduct of Election Rules, 1961 specified the usage of paper ballot and forbade the use of any new methods including electronic voting. It further stated the manner in which the orders were issued for the use of EVMs was unconstitutional and the usage of any alternate means would require to be specified under the law. An amendment to the Representation of the People Act, 1951 which allowed the usage of EVMs, came into force in March 1989.

After a consultation with the political parties, the Election Commission studied the feasibility of a voter-verified paper audit trail (VVPAT) in EVMs as a measure of transparency, and trialed it in some elections. A public-interest litigation was filed in the Supreme Court in 2011 for directing the Election Commission to modify the EVMs to give a slip printed with the symbol of the party in whose favoUr the voter cast. On 8 October 2013, the Supreme Court directed the Election Commission to introduce VVPATs along with EVMs in a phased manner. In 2019, it further directed that two percent of the VVPATs shall be verified to ensure the reliability before the final results were certified. Various opposition parties alleged faulty EVMs and the raised the possibility of tampering of the machines. There have been multiple cases against the usage of EVMs in which the Supreme Court had ruled in the favor of the Election Commission and has declared that the use of EVMs is constitutionally valid.

In a writ petition filed in 2001 by the Association of Democratic reforms, the Supreme Court ordered the mandatory disclosure of criminal records, assets, and education by election candidates, by the Election Commission. In a related case, a three judge bench presided by the then chief justice Altamas Kabir issued notice to the Union government and the Election Commission on a public-interest litigation filed by a group of Non resident Indians for the possibility of providing online or postal ballot for Indian citizens living abroad. In 2024, the Supreme Court struck down an Electoral bonds scheme that allowed individuals and companies to anonymously donate to political parties, stating it was a violation of a voter's right to information about political funding. It also pointed out that it would lead to specific arrangements between corporations and politicians. The State Bank of India and the Election Commission were directed to publish all donor data available, including the names and the number of donors they had collected.

=== LGBT rights ===
In April 2014, in the National Legal Services Authority v. Union of India case, judge K. S. Panicker Radhakrishnan recognised transgender to be the 'third gender' officially as per Indian law. In the ruling, the judge highlighted the ridicule and trauma faced by the community, and it is a moral responsibility of the society to embrace them. He also said that transgender people should be treated consistently with other minorities under the law, enabling them to access jobs, healthcare and education. This resulted in hijras, and eunuchs, apart from binary gender, being treated as the third gender, and also affirmed the individual right for self-identification of gender.

On 6 September 2018, a five-member constitutional bench decriminalised homosexuality by partially striking down Section 377 of the Indian Penal Code in the Navtej Singh Johar v. Union of India case. The bench led by chief justice Dipak Misra unanimously declared that criminalisation of private consensual sex between adult persons of the same sex as unconstitutional. The court, however, held that the section 377 would still apply to bestiality, sex with minors and non consensual sexual acts.

=== Other cases ===
==== Bribery by elected members ====
After the 1991 Indian general election, the Congress (I) led by P. V. Narasimha Rao formed the government. The government, which had 251 members, was supported by 265 members during a no confidence motion. Based on a complaint by Rashtriya Mukti Morcha, the Central Bureau of Investigation (CBI) filed a bribery case on 1 February 1996 on members of the Jharkhand Mukti Morcha, who voted against the motion in the Parliament. A special court ruled that the actions (bribery) of the members outside the Parliament do not protect them from the privilege granted under Article 105(2) of the Constitution which states that "No member of Parliament shall be liable to any proceedings in any court in respect of anything said or any vote given by him in Parliament", and they can be prosecuted as per the Prevention of Corruption Act (1986).

After the Delhi High Court refused to intervene on the decision of the special court, the appellants approached the Supreme Court, which became the P. V. Narasimha Rao v. State case. On 17 April 1998, the five judge bench of the Supreme Court ruled that a Member of Parliament is a "public servant" under the 1988 Act. However, in a three-two split decision, it ruled that as per the Constitution, the members who voted not liable to any legal proceedings in respect of anything said or any vote given in the Parliament. However, in the Sita Soren v. Union of India case in 2024, a seven judge bench of the Supreme Court unanimously overturned its previous verdict, and declared that Members of Parliament and Members of Legislative Assemblies do not enjoy immunity under Articles 105(2) and 194(2) of the Constitution in bribery cases.

==== 2G spectrum case ====
The 2G spectrum case involved politicians and officials of the telecom ministry including then telecom minister A. Raja, who were accused of allotting 122 spectrum licenses in 2008 on conditions that provided an advantage to specific telecom operators that resulted in the loss of ₹1,760 billion (US$19 billion) in government revenue. On 2 February 2012, the Supreme Court declared the allotment of spectrum as unconstitutional and arbitrary and quashed all the 122 licenses issued in 2008 during the time.

==== Right to Information ====
The Right to Information (RTI) Act, 2005 is an act of the parliament which set the rules and procedures regarding citizens' right to access information. In 2010, the Supreme Court filed an appeal before itself challenging the judgement of the Delhi High Court which held that the office of the chief justice of India came under the ambit of the RTI act and was liable to reveal information under it. On 13 November 2019, in a majority judgement of the Supreme Court, the office of the chief justice and governors of the states were brought under the purview of the act.

==== Black money ====
In 2009, a writ petition was filed before the Supreme Court seeking its directions to help bring back the black money stashed abroad by Indians. When the government refused to disclose details of about Indians holding accounts in an overseas bank in 2011, a two judge bench of the Supreme Court ordered the disclosure of the same and the formation of a Special investigation team to probe the matter. Later in 2014, the central government disclosed the names of the people in separate affidavits to the Supreme Court.

==== Administrative reforms ====
In 2013, in the T.S.R. Subramanian vs Union of India case, a division bench of the Supreme Court ruled that officers of the Indian Administrative Service and other All India Services, and other civil servants were not required to follow oral instructions, as they "undermine credibility". The judgement also recommended several reforms to the appointment, transfer, and promotions of civil service personnel. A Civil Services Board, headed by the cabinet secretary at national level, and chief secretary at state level, was to be set up to recommend transfer/postings all Group A officers. Transfers of Group B officers were to be done by the respective heads of departments. It further ordered that there was to be no interference of any ministers in the transfers/postings of civil servants.

==== Right to privacy ====
In the Puttaswamy v. Union of India case in 2017, the Supreme Court upheld that the right to privacy is protected as a fundamental right under Articles 14, 19 and 21 of the constitution. It clarified that the rights could be infringed upon only when there was a compelling state interest for doing so, and overruled three previous judgements of the Supreme Court.

==== Ayodhya dispute ====
The Ayodhya dispute is centered around a plot of land in the city of Ayodhya in Uttar Pradesh, which had been a contentious issue between the Hindus and the Muslims since the 18th century. The Supreme Court has heard several litigations since the first case was filed before it in 1961. On 9 November 2019, a bench of the Supreme Court, led by chief justice Ranjan Gogoi, declared that the disputed land will be given to Hindus for the construction of the temple, and the Muslim community shall be given an alternative piece of land for the construction of a mosque.

== Assessment ==
=== Accountability ===
The Judges (Inquiry) Act, 1968 stipulates that only the Chairman of the Rajya Sabha and the Speaker of the Lok Sabha can take up a complaint relating to the incapacity or misconduct of a Supreme Court judge and form an inquiry committee to investigate it. The Judges Inquiry Bill, 2006 was introduced to replace the 1968 Act and provided for the setting up of a National Judicial Council consisting of the chief justice, two Supreme Court judges and two High Court chief justices to probe allegations of corruption and misconduct by High Court and Supreme Court judges. However, the Bill, which was introduced in the Lok Sabha in December 2006, did not pass.

The Judicial Standards and Accountability Bill, 2010 provided for the establishment of the National Judicial Oversight Committee, the Complaints Scrutiny Panel, and an investigation committee to look into allegations of misconduct against judges. It sought to lay down updated guidelines for the removal of a judge and also stipulated that the judges declare the assets of their families. While the Bill was passed in the Lok Sabha, it did not clear the Upper House of Parliament.

=== Pending cases ===
As per the Supreme Court newsletter, at the end of 2011, there were 58,519 cases pending in the Supreme Court, of which 37,385 had been pending for more than a year. Excluding connected cases, there were 33,892 pending cases before the Court. The number of pending cases dropped slightly to 55,259 by 2014. In May 2014, Chief Justice R.M. Lodha, proposed to make the Indian judiciary work throughout the year (instead of the present system of vacations) in order to reduce the pendency of cases in Indian courts. As per the proposal, the working days and hours would remain the same, and different judges would be going on vacation during different periods of the year of their choosing. However, the Bar Council of India rejected this proposal because it would have inconvenienced the advocates who would have had to work throughout the year and possibly with different judges. The Code of Civil Procedure has been diluted by Supreme Court judgements over time to give the courts the right to endlessly adjourn cases. As per the International Bar Association, this resulted in a serious crisis in access to speedy justice.

=== Allegations of corruption ===
In 2008, the Supreme Court was embroiled in several controversies including allegations of corruption. These included expensive private holidays for judges at government expense, refusal to divulge details of judges' assets to the public, secrecy in the appointment of judges, and the refusal to disclose information under the Right to Information Act. Chief Justice K. G. Balakrishnan invited widespread criticism for his comments claiming that his post was not that of a public servant, but rather that of a constitutional authority, which he later recanted. The judiciary came under criticism from President Pratibha Patil for its failing to handle its duties. Prime Minister Manmohan Singh suggested that corruption was one of the major challenges facing the judiciary, and suggested that there was an urgent need to eradicate this menace.

In 2017, Justice C. S. Karnan, a sitting judge of the Calcutta High Court, wrote to the prime minister and several judicial authorities, flagging the names of 20 judges of various High Courts and the Supreme Court, as well as three officials, alleging that they were corrupt. As he did not provide any evidence regarding his claims, he was found guilty of contempt of court and sentenced to six months' imprisonment by the Supreme Court in a suo moto ruling. The Supreme Court also barred the media from publishing and broadcasting Justice Karnan's statements. He was the first sitting High Court judge in India to be sentenced for contempt of court.

In February 2026, the Supreme Court took suo motu cognisance of a class eight social science textbook published by the National Council of Educational Research and Training, which contained a chapter discussing the challenges faced by the judiciary including judicial accountability, pendency of cases, vacancies of judges, and corruption. A bench consisting of Chief Justice Surya Kant, Justice Joymalya Bagchi, and Justice Vipul Pancholi ordered a complete ban on the publication, circulation, and digital dissemination of the textbook and directed authorities to seize copies already distributed. It further opined that it was a "deep-rooted, well-planned conspiracy" to defame the judiciary, and ordered to find those who were responsible for publishing the chapter.

=== External interference and selection of cases ===
The Supreme Court has been accused of choosing and prioritising cases selectively. For example, the trial to examine the validity of the 99th constitutional amendment, dated 31 December 2014, to form the National Judicial Appointments Commission for the purpose of appointing the judges of the Supreme Court and High Courts, was conducted with the utmost priority and the Supreme Court delivered its judgement on 16 October 2015, quashing the constitutional amendment as unconstitutional and ultra vires, stating that the amendment interfered with the independence of the judiciary.

The pending cases included landmark cases such as the Andhra Pradesh Reorganisation Act, 2014, which was enacted by the Parliament and later challenged as against the stipulated procedure and basic structure of the Constitution. Under the system of checks and balances provided in the Constitution, it is the duty of the judiciary to establish the rule of law at the earliest by rectifying any misuse of the constitution by the parliament. However, the case remained pending for more than six years, with Justice Chelameswar referring to government interference in the case. While the original case was pending, the Supreme Court delivered judgements to dispose of petitions related to the apportionment of assets between the newly formed states of Telangana and Andhra Pradesh, water sharing between the states, and other related cases.

=== Four judges vs. the chief justice ===
On 12 January 2018, four senior judges of the Supreme Court – Justices Chelameswar, Ranjan Gogoi, Madan Lokur, and Kurian Joseph addressed a press conference criticizing Chief Justice Dipak Misra's style of administration and the manner in which he allocated cases among Supreme Court judges. However, people close to Misra denied the allegations that the allocation of cases was unfair. On 20 April 2018, seven opposition parties submitted a petition seeking Mishra's impeachment to the Vice President Venkaiah Naidu, with signatures from 71 parliamentarians. On 23 April 2018, the petition was rejected by Naidu, primarily on the basis that the complaints were about administration and not misbehaviour, and that the impeachment would thus seriously interfere with the constitutionally protected independence of the judiciary.

=== Allegations of harrasement ===
On 18 April 2019, an unnamed woman employee of the Supreme Court filed an affidavit stating that Chief Justice Ranjan Gogoi had sexually harassed her on 10–11 October 2018 by pressing his body against hers without her consent. An in-house committee of the Supreme Court cleared Gogoi of the charges, although the committee's report was not provided to the complainant. There was a protest by a section of lawyers against the manner in which the employee's complaint was dealt with by the Supreme Court. Later, a petition was filed before the National Human Rights Commission to obtain the report of the in-house committee. The complainant later stated that she and her family were systematically victimised as they were all dismissed from service following her protest against Gogoi.

== See also ==
- Constitutional body (India)
