= Dharmo Rakshati Rakshitah =

Sanskrit shloka

Dharmo Rakshati Rakshitah (Sanskrit: धर्मो रक्षति रक्षितः; IAST: dharmo rakṣati rakṣitaḥ) is a popular Sanskrit phrase mentioned in the Mahabharata and Manusmriti verse 8.15. It can be loosely translated as "Dharma protects those who protect it". The closest synonyms for Dharma in English are righteousness and ethics. It is the motto of the Research and Analysis Wing, National Law School of India University and the Hindutva organisation Vishva Hindu Parishad.

== Scriptures ==
The phrase is part of a Manusmriti verse that says:

dharma eva hato hanti dharmo rakṣati rakṣitaḥ tasmād dharmo na hantavyo mā no dharmo hato'vadhīt

— Manusmriti 8.15

धर्म एव हतो हन्ति धर्मो रक्षति रक्षितः तस्माद्धर्मो न हन्तव्यो मा नो धर्मो हतोऽवधीत्

The Manusmriti was first translated by Sir William Jones in 1776 for making legal provisions for Hindus in British India including other Sanskrit religious books.

This phrase is also found in the Mahabharata. It is mentioned three times.

In the Vana Parva (Araneya Parvadhyaya) Yudhishthira said to a yaksha -

धर्म एव हतो हन्ति धर्मो रक्षति रक्षितः । तस्माद् धर्मं न त्यजामि मा नो धर्मो हतोऽवधीत् ।। - Mahabharata 3.313.128 Gita Press Hindi Translation

He who sacrifices virtue is himself destroyed. And he that preserves it is himself preserved. I, therefore, do not sacrifice virtue, considering that if destroyed, it will destroy us.

This translation is from M. N. Dutt's Mahabharata. In that book, this verse is found in 3.312.128.

A slightly different verse is mentioned in the Anushasana Parva.

धर्म एव हतो हन्ति धर्मो रक्षति रक्षितः । तस्माद् धर्मो न हन्तव्यः पार्थिवेन विशेषतः ।। - Mahabharata 13.145.2 Gita Press, Hindi Translation

It is also mentioned in Mahabharata 3.30.8 Gita Press, Hindi Translation.

== See also ==
- Ahimsa Paramo Dharma
- Yato Dharmastato Jayah
