= Polar opposite =

A polar opposite is the diametrically opposite point of a circle or sphere. It is mathematically known as an antipodal point, or antipode when referring to the Earth. It is also an idiom often used to describe binary oppositions.

Polar Opposite or Polar Opposites may also refer to:

- Polar Opposite, a 2011 EP by Sick Puppies
- Polar Opposites, a 2000 album by Junior Pantherz
- "Polar Opposites", an episode of the television series The Wild Thornberrys
- "Polar Opposites", an episode of the television series Tanked
- Polar Opposites, a 2008 action drama written by Paolo Mazzucato and directed by Fred Olen Ray
- Polar Opposites, a 2025 Hallmark movie starring Rhiannon Fish
- "Polar Opposites", a song by Modest Mouse from the album The Lonesome Crowded West
- "Polar Opposites", a song by Drake from the album For All the Dogs
- "You and I Are Polar Opposites", a manga by Kōcha Agasawa and it's anime adaptation.

== See also ==
- Polarization (disambiguation)
- Opposite (disambiguation)
- Apples and oranges, comparing two items or groups of items that cannot be practically compared
