= MacExpo London =

Former trade show held in London

MacExpo London was a trade show dedicated to the Apple Macintosh and iPod which was held annually in London, United Kingdom at the Olympia Exhibition Centre from 2002 to 2007. It was a major part of Apple's calendar.

== Background ==
In 2004, Macworld UK, part of the IDG UK division of IDG, created two Macworld Conference events on its own: one standalone conference, and one conference adjoining the MacExpo trade show in London. In 2005, the show attracted 25,000 visitors and 185 exhibitors.

Many large corporations attended the show including Microsoft, Adobe Systems, Quark, Inc. and others. Apple Inc. also attended each year with a large booth. MacExpo included product demonstrations, special offers, speeches and more. Unlike the larger and more influential MacWorld Conference & Expo held annually in January in California, then-CEO Steve Jobs did not attend MacExpo for keynote speeches; However, MacExpo remained the largest annual event for the Macintosh and related Apple products in many countries in Europe.

In 2011, the IT retail industry site PCR announced that it would run a conference called AppleExpo in May 2012 at Earls Court Exhibition Centre, London.
