= Contrary Creek =

Contrary Creek may refer to:

- Contrary Creek (Gasconade River), a stream in Missouri
- Contrary Creek (Missouri River), a stream in Missouri
- Contrary Creek (North Anna River), a stream in Virginia
