= Order of the Sun (India) =

Awarded by Maharaja of Jaipur
- Type: Order of chivalry
- Motto: Yato Dharmastato Jayah यतो धर्मस्ततो जय: یتو دھرمستّو جے
- Awarded for: At the Maharaja's pleasure
- Sovereign: Crown Prince Padmanabh Singh

Precedence
- Next (higher): The Most Eminent Order of the Star of Dhundhar
- Next (lower): Order of Merit

The Order of the Sun is a chivalric order of knights in India, being awarded by the Royal House of Jaipur. The motto of the Order of the Sun is Yato Dharmastato Jayah, meaning 'Where There is Virtue, There is Victory' and the badge of the Order of the Sun is an "eight-petalled flower in red enamel".

The designer of the decorations for the Order of the Sun was M.H.S. Spielman of Oxford.

In her 2017 bal des débutantes, Ava Phillippe took Padmanabh Singh as her date and as is customary with full evening dress, he was wearing the decoration of the Order of the Sun.
