= Disinfectant (software) =

Anti-virus software

- Disinfectant software icon
- Developer: John Norstad at Northwestern University
- Release: March 18, 1989; 37 years ago
- Final release: 3.7.1 / July 1997; 29 years ago
- Operating system: Classic Mac OS
- License: Freeware

Disinfectant was a popular antivirus software program for the classic Mac OS. It was originally released as freeware by John Norstad in the spring of 1989. Disinfectant featured a system extension that would detect virus infections and an application with which users could scan for and remove viruses. New versions of Disinfectant were subsequently released to detect additional viruses. Bob LeVitus praised and recommended Disinfectant in 1992. In May 1998, Norstad retired Disinfectant, citing the new danger posed by macro viruses, which Disinfectant did not detect, and the inability of a single individual to maintain a program that caught all of them.
