= Contrary Creek (Gasconade River tributary) =

Stream in the US state of Missouri

Coordinates: 38°29′21″N 91°39′50″W

Contrary Creek is a stream in Osage County in the U.S. state of Missouri. It is a tributary of Gasconade River.

The headwaters are at and the confluence with the Gasconade is at . The stream headwaters arise just east of Missouri Route 89 and west of the community of Welcome. The stream flows to the southeast past Welcome and under Missouri Route N between Freedom and Ryors. The strean then turns to the north adjacent to U. S. Route 50 and then northwest before entering the Gasconade below Mount Sterling in adjacent Gasconade County.

Contrary Creek was named for the fact the direction in which Contrary Creek flows is contrary relative to other nearby streams.

== See also ==
- List of rivers of Missouri
