= Macworld/iWorld =

Information technology trade show hosted by Apple Inc

Macworld/iWorld was an information technology trade show and conference focused on Apple's Macintosh platform. Organized by International Data Group (IDG), publisher of Macworld magazine, it was held annually in the United States beginning in 1985. Originally known as Macworld, the event was later renamed Macworld Expo, Macworld Conference & Exposition, and finally Macworld/iWorld.

Apple was the conference's principal exhibitor, with company executives regularly delivering keynote presentations and using the event to introduce new products and technologies. Apple announced in December 2008 that the 2009 conference would be its last appearance at the event. Following Apple's departure, IDG continued the conference until 2014.

== History ==
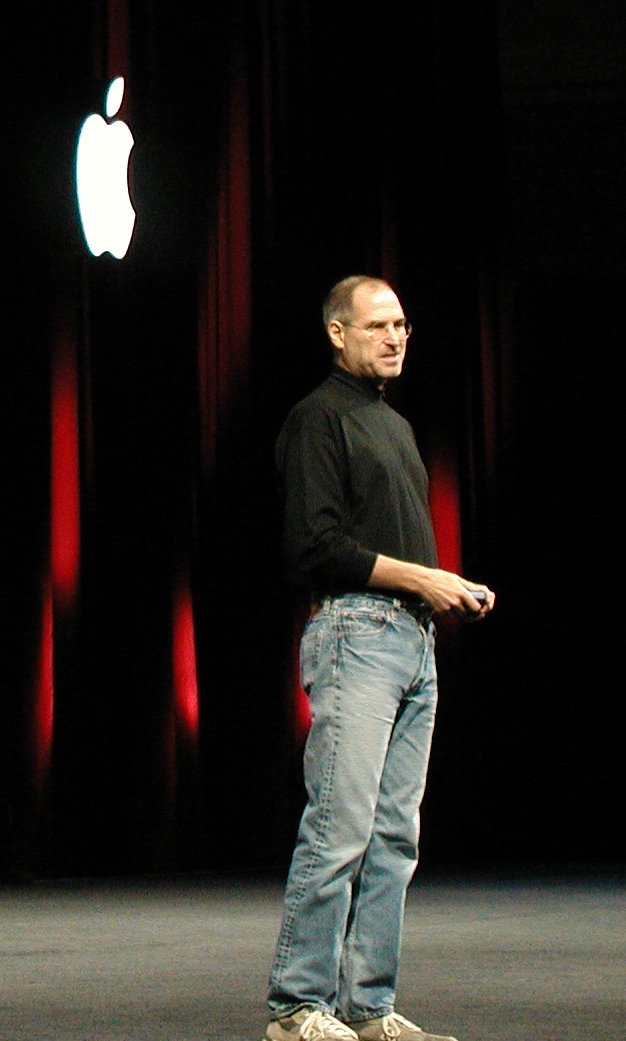
Steve Jobs delivers the 2005 keynote address.

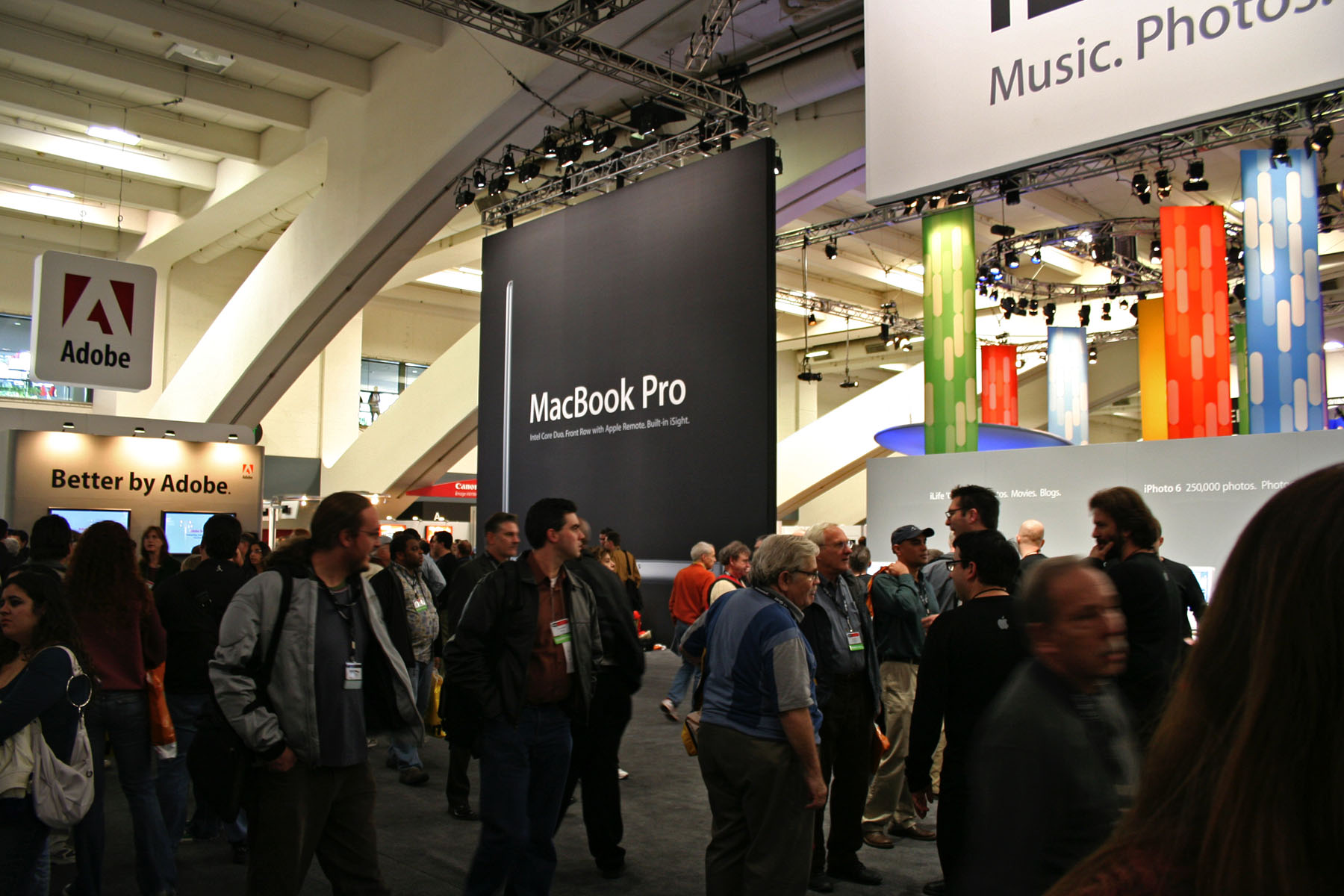
Attendees at Macworld Expo 2006 in the Moscone Center

The first Macworld Expo occurred in 1985 in San Francisco. The conference itself was created by Peggy Kilburn, who helped to increase the size and profit of the event during her tenure (1985–1999). Among the speakers recruited by Kilburn were David Pogue, Steve Case, Bob LeVitus, as well as representatives from BMUG, LaserBoard, and other major user groups.

Participation by Apple was usually the central event of a Macworld Expo, and from 1997 through 2008, the show was known for its keynote presentations (sometimes called "Stevenotes") delivered by CEO Steve Jobs.

The San Francisco event has always been held at the Moscone Center. The Expo was also held in Brooks Hall near the San Francisco Civic Center from 1985 until 1993, when the expansion of Moscone Center allowed the show to be consolidated in one location.

Until 2005, the U.S. shows were held semiannually, with a January show in San Francisco and an additional summer show held in the Eastern US. The later event was held initially in Boston at the Bayside Expo Center, later expanding with a dual presence at the World Trade Center Boston. From 1998 to 2003 it took place in New York City's Javits Center. The 2004 and 2005 summer shows, retitled Macworld Conference & Expo took place in Boston, although without Apple's participation. Other companies followed Apple's lead, canceling or reducing the size of their own exhibits, which resulted in reduced attendance compared with previous Macworld conferences. On 16 September 2005, IDG announced that no further summertime shows would be held in NYC or in Boston.

The show has also taken place in other cities:

- A Tokyo show, produced by IDG World Expo Japan, was held at Makuhari Messe and moved to Tokyo Big Sight in 2002.
- Macworld Expo Summit, a version of the show targeted at U.S. government customers, was held at the Washington Convention Center in Washington, D.C. as late as 1994.
- In 2004, Macworld UK, part of the IDG UK division of IDG, created two Macworld Conference events on its own: one standalone conference, and one conference adjoining the MacExpo trade show in London.

=== 1987 ===
The 1987 Boston Macworld Expo was held on August 11–13. The most significant product introduction at the show was Bill Atkinson's HyperCard. More than 3,000 copies of the software were handed out. MultiFinder, Apple File Exchange, the ImageWriter LQ, EtherTalk, AppleShare PC and the AppleFax Modem were among Apple's product announcements. Promoters estimated 40,000 people attended the show. MacUser's review of the show concluded positively, saying that it was "revealing, exhilarating, and disappointing. While the Mac is clearly becoming the business machine of choice through much of corporate America, the show didn't have the sterile atmosphere that pure business trade shows have. Most of the time it was plain outright exciting. And the promise of the future that was always in the air was wholly positive."

=== 1988 ===
The San Francisco Macworld was attended by 45,000 people and had 400 exhibits; Apple's primary announcement for this show was a new family of LaserWriter printers. Later that year, the Boston MacWorld Expo was held at the Boston World Trade Center, hosting approximately 40,000 people from August 11th through the 13th of that year, with approximately 350 companies presenting across some 1,200 booths.

=== 1991 ===
Outbound Computers demonstrated the first Macintosh-compatible portable computers at the Boston show, preceding Apple's own introduction of the PowerBook by a couple of months.

=== 1995 ===
Macworld Expo took place in three locations: San Francisco (January 4–7), Washington DC (April 26–28), and Boston (August 8–11). Apple introduced the "Power Surge" line of Power Macintosh computers at the Boston show, consisting of the Power Macintosh 8500, 7500 and 7200.

=== 1997 ===
During Macworld in San Francisco, a focus in CEO Gil Amelio's keynote was Apple's recently announced purchase of NeXT, which would include the return of company co-founder Steve Jobs in an advisory role, and the adaptation of its NeXTSTEP operating system into a future release of Mac OS codenamed "Rhapsody". The signature hardware announcement of the show was the Twentieth Anniversary Macintosh, a limited-edition model designed to mark the 20th anniversary of the founding of Apple Computer.

That August, Macworld in Boston featured Steve Jobs' first appearance at the exhibition as interim CEO, and came on the heels of the release of Mac OS 8. During his keynote, Jobs notably announced that Apple had reached several agreements with Microsoft to ensure the company's stability, which included an agreement to settle patent disputes with Microsoft over its Windows operating system (including patent cross-licensing agreements), a $150 million stock investment in the company by Microsoft, a commitment for Microsoft to develop versions of Office for Macintosh for the next five years (beginning with the upcoming Office 98), and an agreement to ship Internet Explorer as the default web browser on future releases of Mac OS (with Netscape still available as an option alongside it). Microsoft co-founder Bill Gates made a remote appearance to acknowledge the partnerships, which was infamously met with a shower of boos from the audience.

Jobs argued that he wanted to abandon the notion of Microsoft and Apple needing to be rivals, explaining that "we have to embrace a notion that for Apple to win, Apple has to do a really good job. And if others are going to help us that's great, because we need all the help we can get, and if we screw up and we don't do a good job, it's not somebody else's fault, it's our fault.".

=== 1998 ===
During Macworld in San Francisco, Jobs discussed Apple's recent release of the Power Macintosh G3 and PowerBook G3, an agreement with CompUSA to establish "store-within-a-store" concepts devoted to its products, and the upcoming Mac OS 8.1 update (which introduced the new HFS+ file system, and support for UDF disks) and QuickTime 3.0. Jobs revealed that the company was on track to achieve a profit of $45 million by the end of the quarter, buoyed by the G3 Macs and the recent launch of the Apple online store. Microsoft also presented Internet Explorer 4.0 for Mac.

At Macworld in New York in July, Jobs addressed Apple's return to growth and profitability (using a theme of the "Apple Hierarchy of Skepticism", inspired by Maslow's hierarchy of needs), and also showcased a number of games being supported on Mac. He discussed aspects of the recently announced iMac and PowerBook G3 Series (including new USB accessories for the computers), and announced that the iMac would be released August 15, 1998 release, and include a 56K modem at launch rather than the previously-announced 33K unit. Jobs also revealed a roadmap for upcoming Mac OS releases, including the upcoming Mac OS 8.5, a future update to Mac OS codenamed "Sonata" to be released in 1999, and that "Rhapsody" would be released as Mac OS X Server 1.0 in 1999.

=== 1999 ===
During Macworld in San Francisco, Jobs announced that the company had reached its fifth consecutive quarter of profitability. He unveiled the new "Blue and White" Power Macintosh G3, and a revision to the iMac with updated specifications and new color options. Part of the keynote also focused on the release of Mac OS X Server, featuring a demonstration of the NetBoot feature, and QuickTime Streaming Server by presenting a large wall of 50 diskless iMacs all streaming videos from the same Power Mac G3. Connectix presented its Virtual Game Station software for emulating the PlayStation on PowerPC Macs, and Microsoft demonstrated Internet Explorer 4.5 Macintosh Edition.

During Macworld in New York City, Jobs unveiled Apple's new consumer laptop, the iBook, as well as AirPort, a wireless gateway and network card for wireless networking implementing the 802.11 specification. Jobs also announced a release date for Mac OS 9.

=== 2000 ===
Macworld 2000 in San Francisco featured the unveiling of the new "Aqua" user interface and "Quartz" graphics engine of Mac OS X, and Jobs' announcement that its first version would be released in January 2001 after a final preview release. Jobs also announced that he had been promoted to full-time CEO of Apple.

During Macworld in New York City, Apple unveiled a new iMac revision with upgraded specifications and a new suite of color options, updated Power Mac G4 models, the new optical Apple Pro Mouse (replacing the "hockey puck" mouse introduced with the iMac), and the Power Mac G4 Cube. It was also announced that the Mac OS X Public Beta had been delayed to September.

=== 2001 ===
At the San Francisco show, Apple introduced iTunes, and iDVD, an upgraded Power Mac G4 and the PowerBook G4, their first widescreen portable.

The New York show took place at the Jacob K. Javits Convention Center. Apart from an upgraded Power Mac G4 and the announcement of Mac OS X 10.1, there were no major announcements from Apple, but the keynote presentation did feature a segment on the megahertz myth, presented by Jon Rubenstein. Attendance was 64,000, a record for the event.

=== 2002 ===
The Summer 2002 show took place in New York City with a keynote on Wednesday, July 17. The keynote speech introduced the 17-inch version of the iMac G4.

In October 2002, IDG World Expo announced plans to move the 2004 edition of the East Coast show to Boston. The day of that announcement, Apple declared its intent not to participate in the Boston Macworld Expo.

=== 2003 ===
The January keynote introduced the Safari web browser, AirPort Extreme, 12- and 17-inch PowerBooks. This show also saw the launch of the world's first interactive video CD-ROM, NightWatch.

In 2003, IDG World Expo renamed the New York trade show Macworld CreativePro Conference & Expo in an attempt to reach the creative market in the New York area.

Steve Jobs was absent from the Macworld keynote held in New York in July, which was instead delivered by Vice President of Product Marketing Greg "Joz" Joswiak.

=== 2004 ===
Along with the usual show in San Francisco and the return to Boston, a Macworld Expo was held in Paris. At the Paris Expo, Apple's VP of marketing Phil Schiller introduced the new updated iMac featuring a PowerPC G5 processor and other various updates, notably, the integration of the logic board and optical drive with the display.

=== 2005 ===
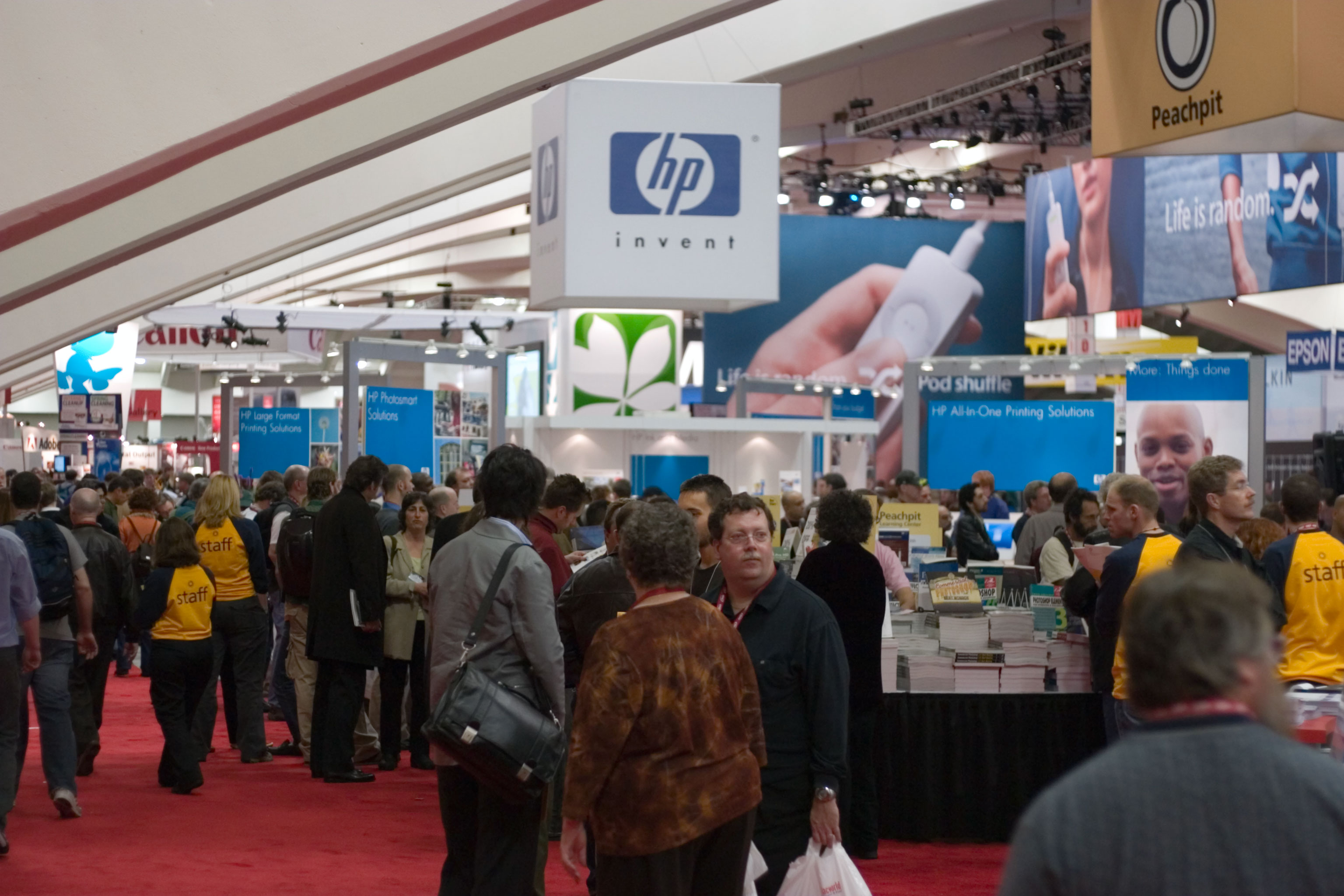
Macworld 2005

The San Francisco show was held January 10–14. The keynote introduced the Mac Mini, iPod shuffle, and iWork.

During the show, IDG World Expos announced Macworld On Tour, a series of small conferences in various North American cities. An initial conference, in Kissimmee, Florida, was later canceled. No future announcements for Macworld On Tour have been made. IDG announces Macworld East cancelled that there would be no Macworld East 2006.

=== 2006 ===
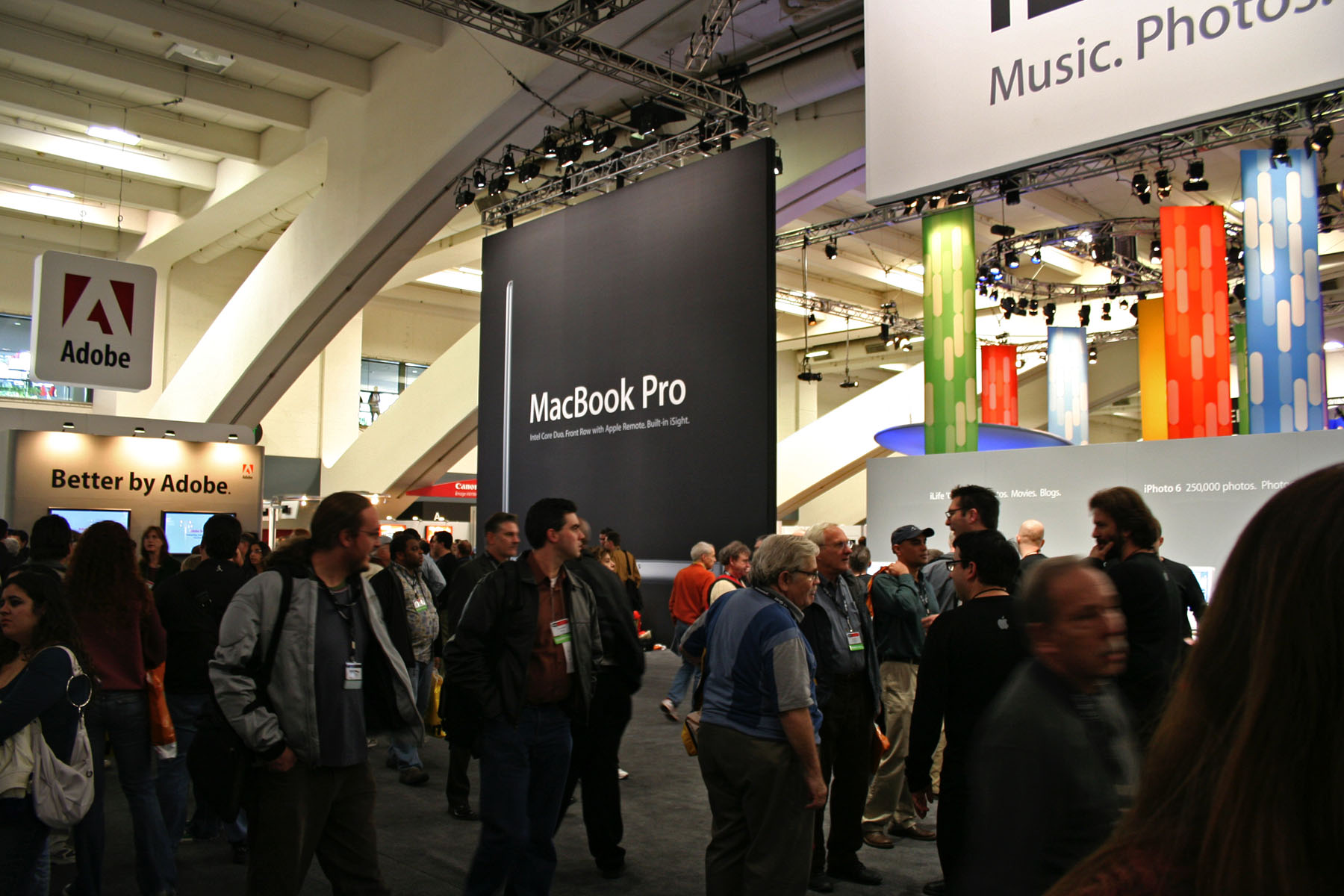
Macworld 2006

In January 2006, Intel Core Duo-based iMacs were announced to be ready for purchase. The conference was held January 9–13 and the number of visitors increased by 6.8% over the 2005 event, to 38,441. The number of paid conference delegates increased by 20% to 4,188, and the total number of exhibiting companies increased by 25% to 367.

=== 2007 ===
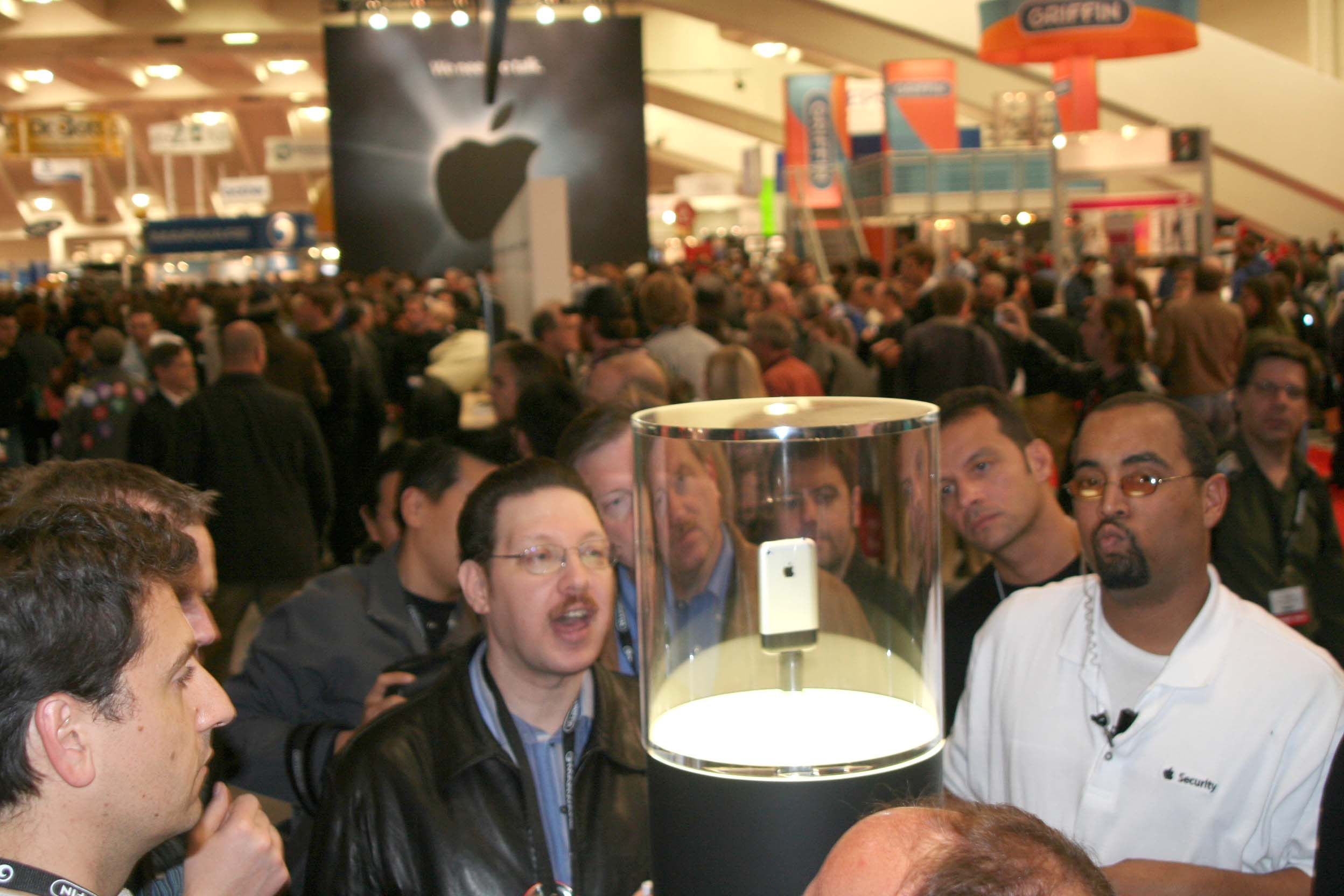
First iPhone at Macworld 2007

At Macworld 2007 (January 8–12), Steve Jobs introduced the iPhone mobile device, revealed the final name for the Apple TV (originally called by its code name iTV), and announced a change of name for the company from Apple Computer, Inc. to simply Apple Inc., reflecting its longtime focus on the user experience as opposed to the technology behind it.

IDG World Expo reported Macworld 2007 attendance as 45,572, a 19% increase over the previous year.

=== 2008 ===
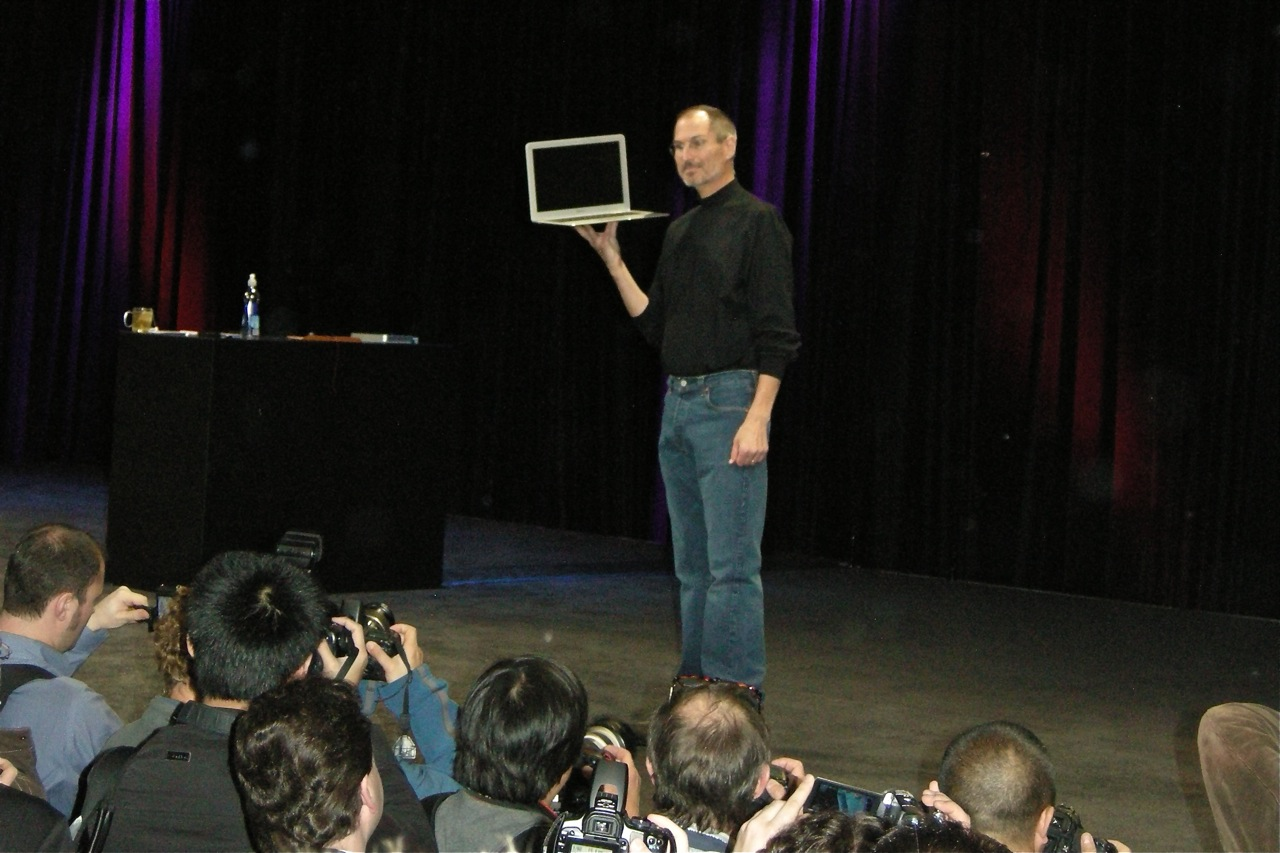
Steve Jobs introduces the MacBook Air during his keynote at Macworld 2008.

At Macworld 2008 (January 14–18), Steve Jobs introduced the MacBook Air — touted as the world's thinnest notebook computer; the Time Capsule device for use with the Time Machine application in Mac OS X 10.5 "Leopard", iPod Touch updates including Mail, Stocks, Notes, Maps & Weather, iTunes Movie Rentals, the Apple TV Take 2 updates with an all new interface, the ability to download TV shows, music, podcasts and rent or download movies without the need for a PC; and finally the iPhone/iPod Touch SDK launching in late February.

IDG World Expo reported that Macworld 2008 attendance increased 10% over the previous year.

=== 2009 ===
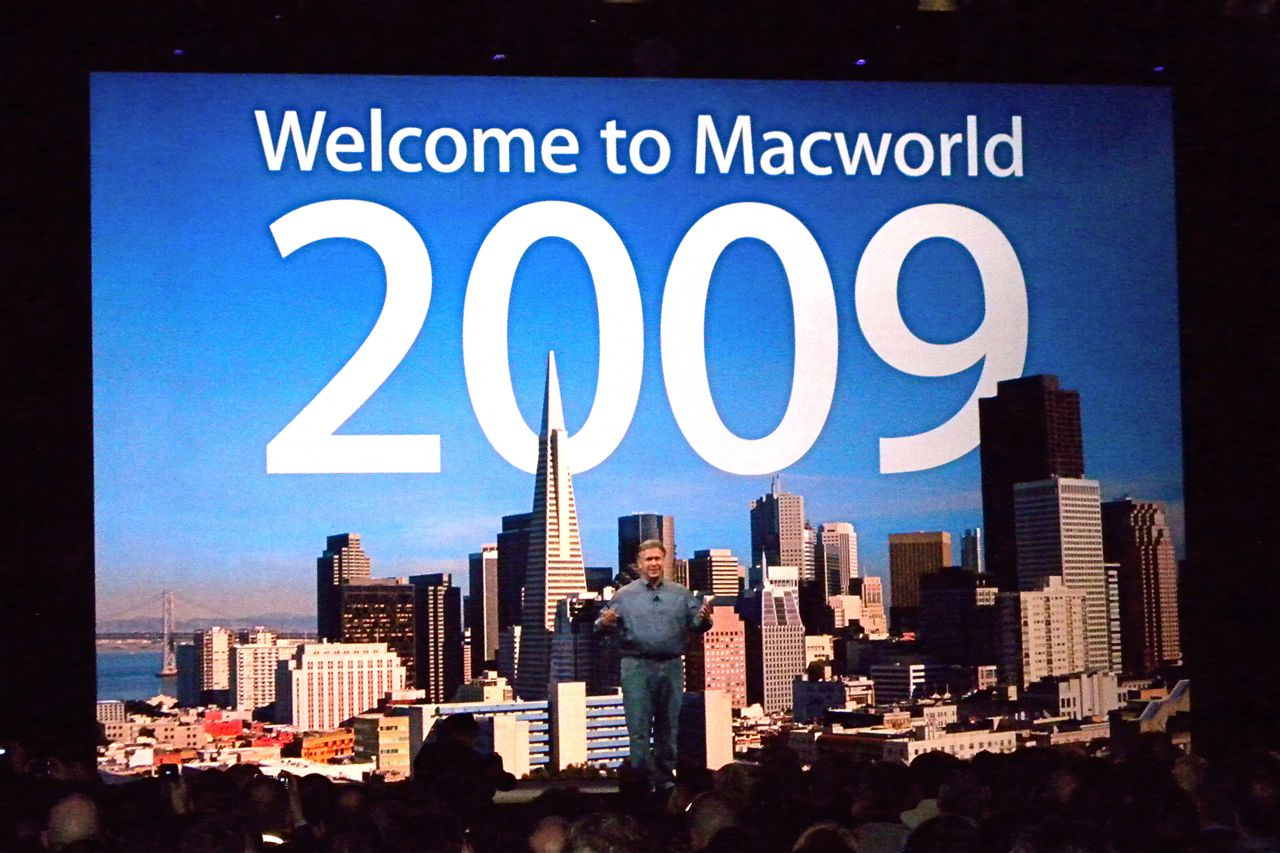
Phil Schiller delivers the keynote at Macworld 2009.

The San Francisco show went on January 5–9, 2009. On December 16, 2008, Apple announced that the 2009 conference would be the last in which the company would participate. The conference's keynote address was delivered by Apple's senior vice president of product marketing Phil Schiller, not Steve Jobs, as had been the custom for the past ten years. Steve Jobs issued a press release stating that the reasons for his absence were health related, specifically citing a hormone imbalance.

At Macworld 2009, Apple announced the release of iLife '09, iWork '09, and the new 17-inch unibody MacBook Pro with a non user-removable battery. Also, Apple announced that iTunes would begin to sell all music DRM-free, with a three-tier pricing system per track: $0.69, $0.99, and $1.29 (or £0.59, £0.79, and £0.99 in the UK). This differs from Apple's previous model with only one price per track of $0.99 (£0.79 in the UK). Apple also announced that tracks can now be downloaded over cellular networks on the iPhone.

=== 2010 ===
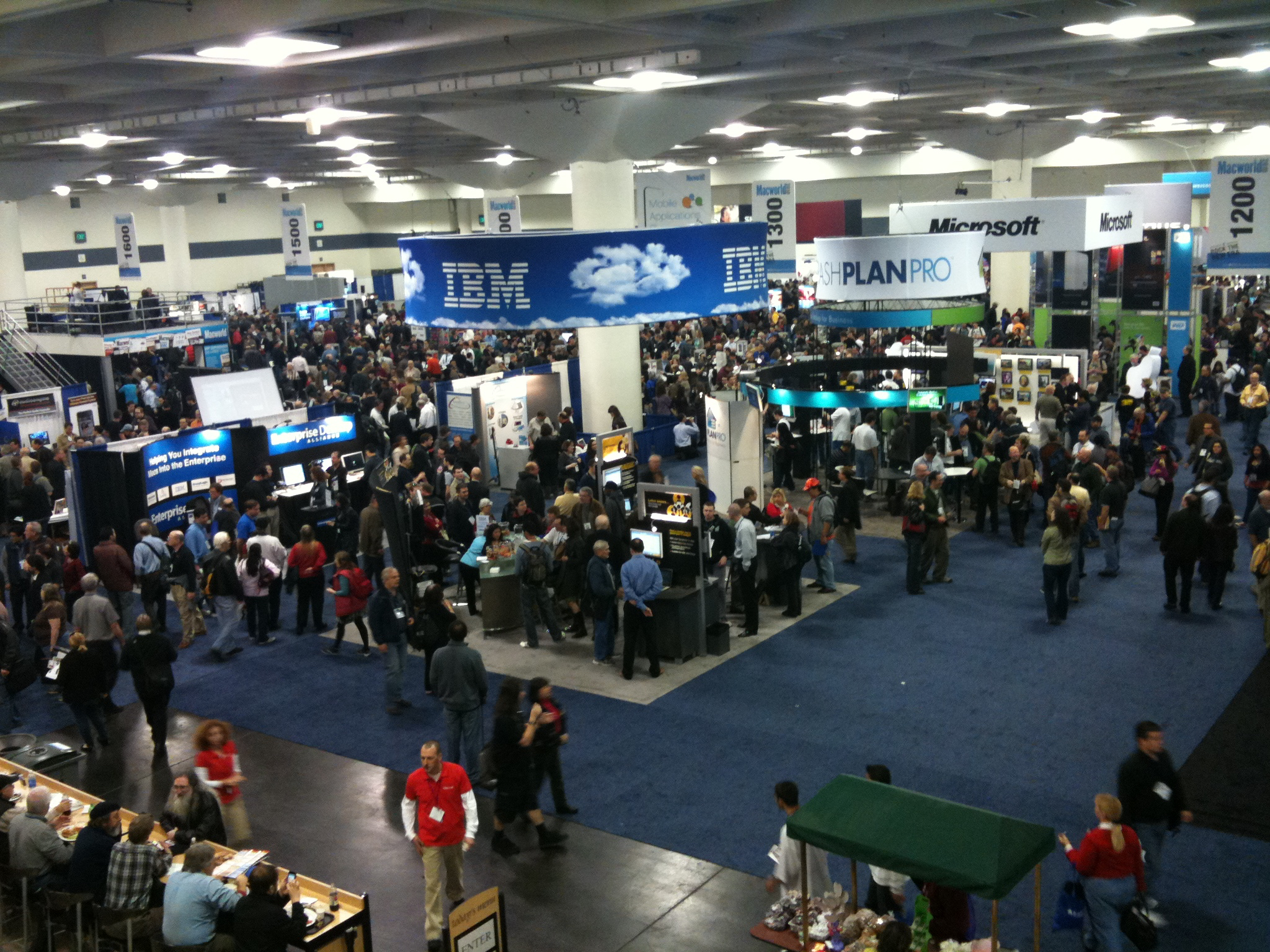
Macworld 2010

On March 30, 2009, IDG World Expo announced that the conference would be moving from January (during which it had taken place for 25 years) to February. They also said:

Macworld 2010 will further break from tradition by shifting the expo portion of the event to include a Saturday. The Expo now is scheduled to take place Thursday, February 11, through Saturday, February 13. This shift will provide all attendees, including full-time professionals, with more flexible times and convenient weekend access to the show floor. The Macworld conference sessions will take place Tuesday, February 9, through Saturday, February 13.

— IDG World Expo

=== 2011 ===
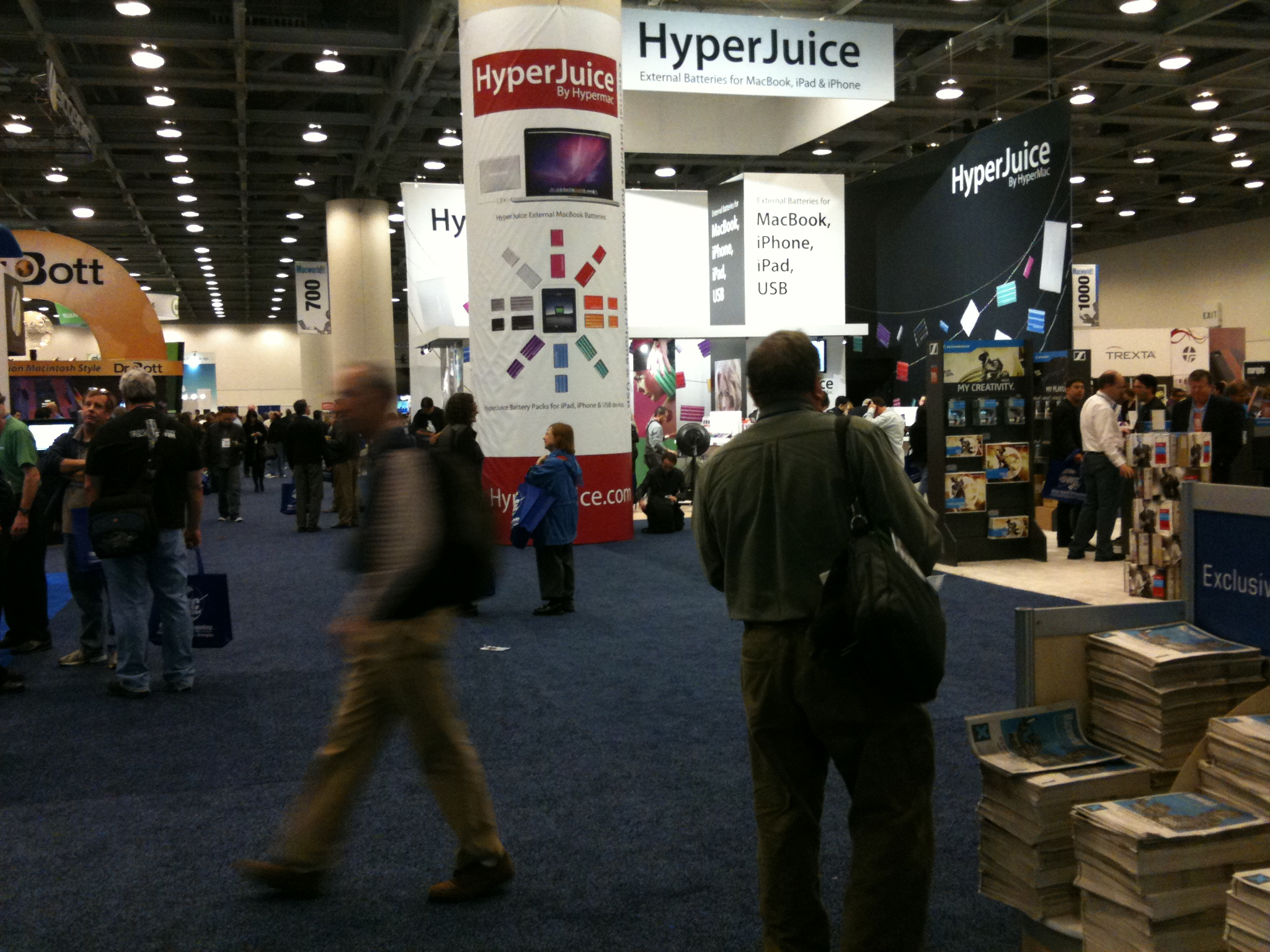
Macworld 2011

The 2011 Macworld was held January 25–29, 2011.

=== 2012 ===
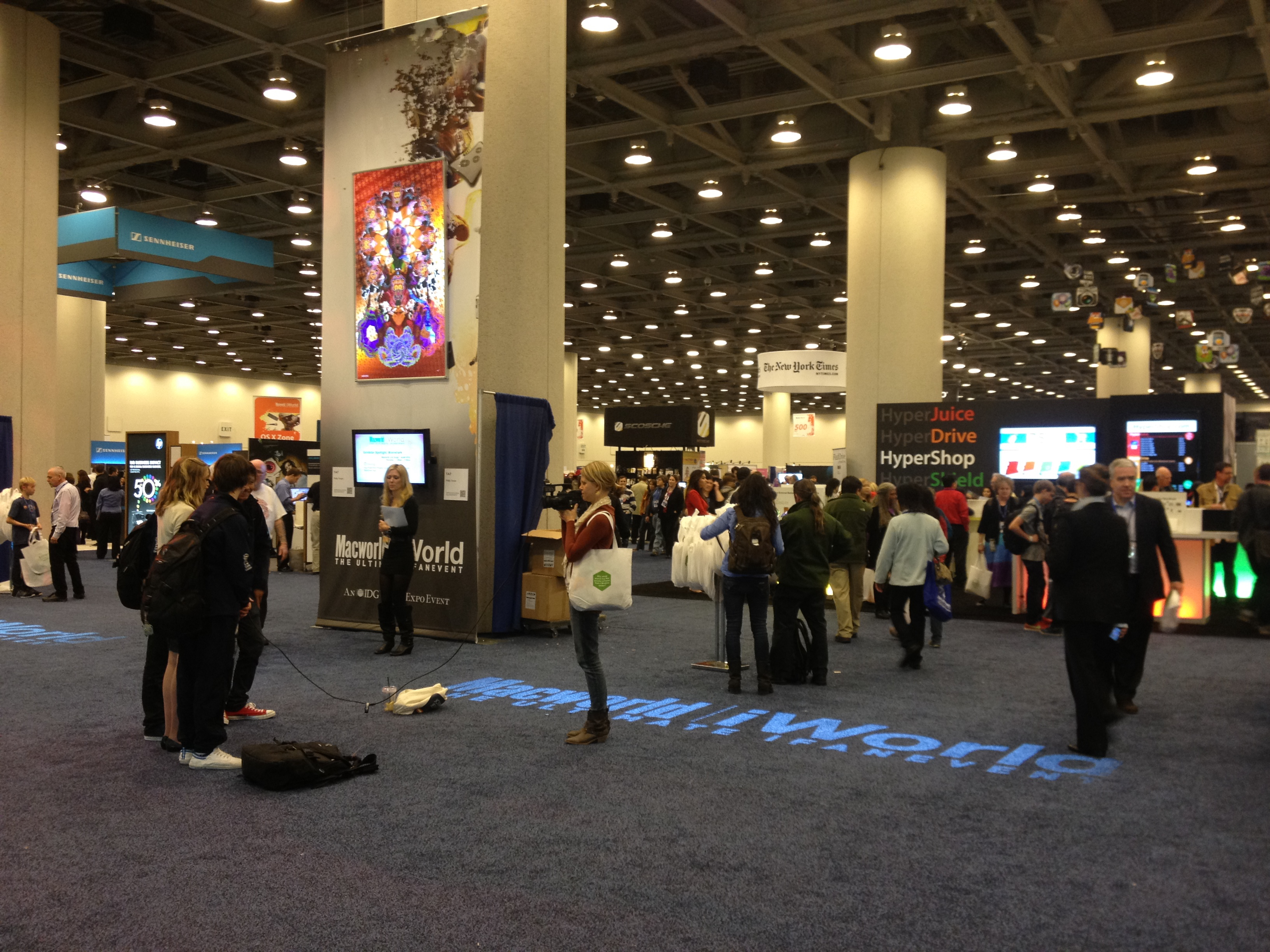
Macworld 2012

The 2012 Macworld/iWorld was held January 26–28. Just before registration opened for the 2012 conference, Macworld announced that they would be changing the name to Macworld/iWorld in addition to broadening the focus to all iOS devices.

=== 2013 ===
The 2013 Macworld/iWorld was held from January 31 to February 2, 2013.

=== 2014 ===
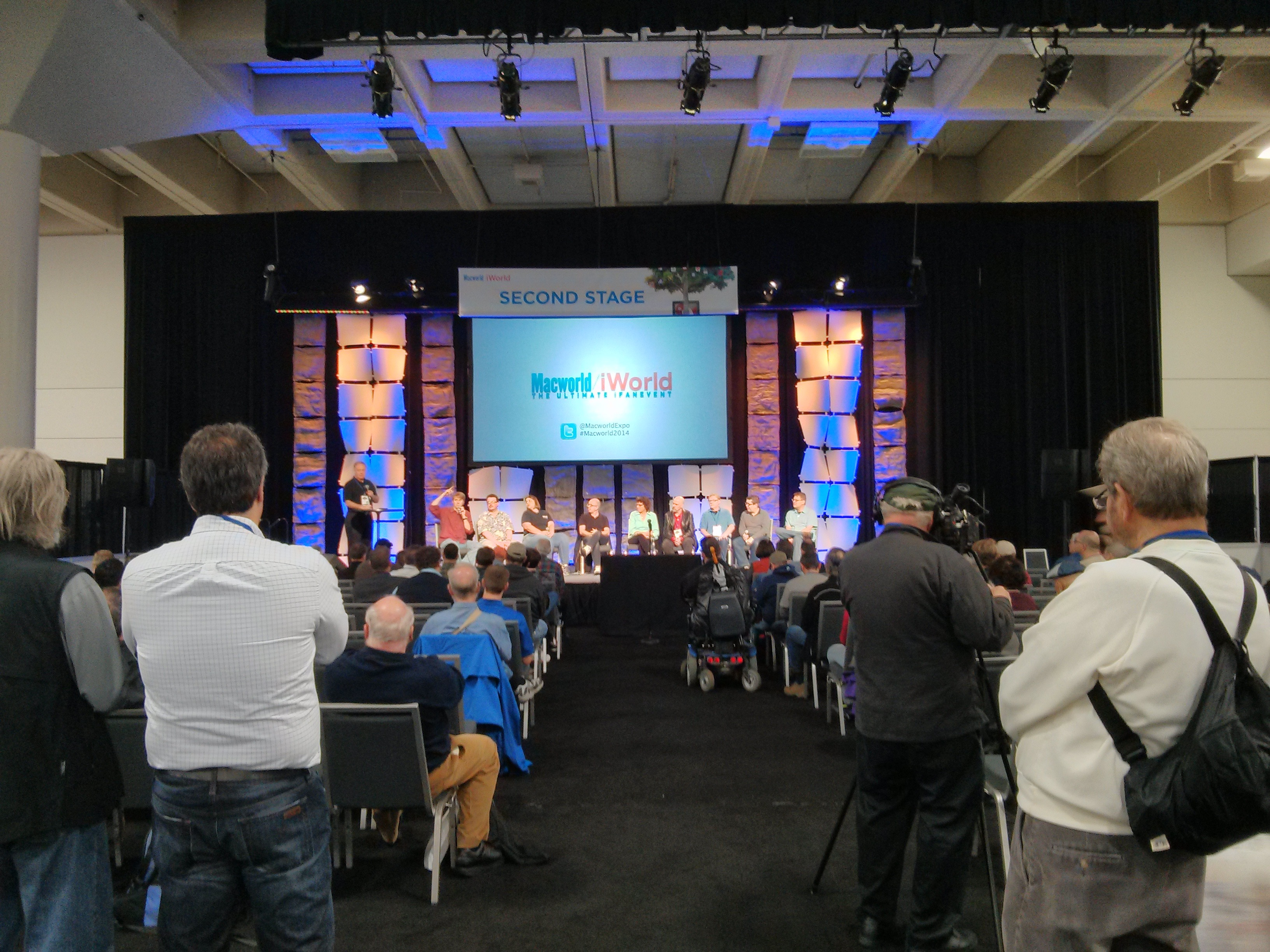
Macworld 2014

The 2014 Macworld/iWorld was held from March 27 to March 29, 2014. This was the last ever Apple keynote to be branded as Macworld/iWorld.

=== 2015 ===
The 2015 Macworld/iWorld was scheduled to be held from March 12 to March 14, 2015, but was cancelled by IDG. Any further Apple keynotes would now be hosted under the name Apple Event.

== See also ==
- Apple Inc. advertising
- List of Apple Inc. media events
- Stevenote
- Worldwide Developers Conference
