= Ryors, Missouri =

Ghost town in Missouri, United States

Coordinates: 38°28′57″N 91°41′54″W

Ryors is an extinct town in Osage County, in the U.S. state of Missouri. The GNIS classifies it as a populated place.

A post office called Ryors was established in 1905, and remained in operation until 1934. The community has the name of R.S. Ryors, a local attorney.
