= Anti (song) =

Single by SOB X RBE

from the album SOB X RBE
- Released: July 24, 2017
- Genre: Hyphy; West Coast hip hop
- Length: 2:49
- Label: SOB X RBE
- Songwriters: Jabbar Kingston Brown Jr. (lyricist), Juwon Lee (lyricist)
- Producer: Maczmusik

Music video
- "Anti" on YouTube

"Anti" is a song by American hip hop group SOB X RBE. The song was produced by Maczmusik. On September 28, 2016, the official music video was uploaded to their channel. By July 2017 the video had had 12 million views. It was released as a single for digital download on July 24, 2017. On August 3, 2018, the single was certified gold by the RIAA and has over half a million certified units. It is also SOB's first single to be certified gold by the RIAA. The song was featured in NBA 2K19.

== Certifications ==
| Region | Certification | Certified units/sales |
|---|---|---|
| United States (RIAA) | Platinum | 1,000,000^{‡} |
^{‡} Sales+streaming figures based on certification alone.
