= Apposition (disambiguation) =

Apposition is the quality of being side-by-side or next to each other, such as in:

- Apposition, a grammatical construction in which two nouns are juxtaposed
- Thumb apposition
- Apposition eyes
- Bone apposition in fractures
- Apposition in embryo implantation
- Apposition, an annual ceremony in St Paul's School, London
