= Bob LeVitus =

American author and columnist (born 1955)

Bob LeVitus (Note: Pronounced Lev-EYE-tus) (born April 4, 1955 in Chicago, and also known as Dr. Macintosh) is an American author of more than 75 computer-related books, particularly on the Apple Macintosh, iPhone, and iPad for the book series ...For Dummies. He worked as a columnist for the Houston Chronicle since 1996 and for The Mac Observer since 2001, until his retirement from both outlets in 2022. In 2001, Macworld magazine described him as "a well-known columnist and speaker in the Mac world".

== Career ==
In 1984, LeVitus ran a market research firm. Convinced that the original Macintosh, released that same year, could "revolutionize" his business, he proposed buying one. After his partners refused, he sold his shares in the company and left to start his own short-lived market research firm. After a sales call to Macintosh trade magazine MACazine, he closed his firm and joined the latter in 1986 as an executive editor. The magazine was owned by publisher Hart Graphics, whose chairman, Bill Hart, saw LeVitus as a "perfect match" due to his industry connections and "chutzpah". The magazine closed in 1988 after a sale to MacUser, where LeVitus then served as a columnist until MacUser's 1998 closure. According to Austin American-Statesman's Lori Hawkins, by then, LeVitus's "no-hold-barred, take-no-prisoners" software reviews had earned him a reputation as a "Macintosh cult icon".

LeVitus adopted the "Dr. Macintosh" nickname in his first Addison-Wesley book, Dr. Macintosh: Tips, Techniques and Advice on Mastering the Macintosh (1989, reedited 1991), which sold 100,000 copies. By 1995, nine of his books had hit best-sellers list.

In May 1995, he was hired as chief evangelist for Power Computing, a Macintosh clone seller.

In 2005, when John Wiley & Sons published iCon, Apple stopped selling all Wiley books in its Apple Stores, including LeVitus's Macs for Dummies books.

In 2009, LeVitus, and reportedly all other columnists, were fired from MacCentral after a downsizing.

LeVitus appeared at a number of Mac-focused meetups and events, including MacLive, MacFest, MacCORE, MacMania, and was a regular at the Macworld/iWorld trade show.

LeVitus retired from the Houston Chronicle and MacObserver in 2022.

== Personal life ==
LeVitus is married with two children.

== Works ==
- LeVitus, Bob (1989). Dr. Macintosh: Tips, Techniques, and Advice on Mastering the Macintosh. Addison-Wesley Publishing Company. ISBN 978-0-201-51733-0.
- LeVitus, Bob (1990). Stupid Mac Tricks: Volume 1. Addison-Wesley. ISBN 978-0-201-57046-5.
- LeVitus, Bob; Ihnatko, Andy (1992). Dr. Macintosh's Guide to the On-line Universe. Addison-Wesley. ISBN 978-0-201-58125-6.
- LeVitus, Bob; Fraase, Michael (1993). Guide to the Macintosh Underground: Mac Culture from the Inside. Hayden Books. ISBN 978-0-672-48549-7.
- LeVitus, Bob (1994). Macintosh System 7.5 for Dummies. IDG Books. ISBN 978-1-56884-197-7.
- LeVitus, Bob (25 May 2005). Mac OS X Tiger For Dummies. John Wiley & Sons. ISBN 978-0-471-75138-0.
