= Yato Dharmastato Jayah =

Sanskrit verse from the Mahabharata

Translations of Yato Dharmastato Jayaḥ
- Sanskrit: यतो धर्मस्ततो जयः
- Assamese: যতো ধৰ্মস্ততো জয়ঃ
- Balinese: ᬬᬢᭀ ᬥᬭ᭄ᬫᬲ᭄ᬢᬢᭀ ᬚᬬ᭄ ᬄ
- Bengali: যতো ধর্মস্ততো জয়ঃ
- Hindi: यतो धर्मस्ततो जयः
- Javanese: ꦪꦠꦺꦴ ꦣꦫ꧀ꦩꦱ꧀ꦠꦠꦺꦴ ꦗꦪ꧀ ꦃ
- Kannada: ಯತೊ ಧರ್ಮಸ್ತತೊ ಜಯ್ಃ
- Kashmiri: یَتو دھرمَستَتو جَیَہ
- Malayalam: യതോ ധർമസ്തതോ ജയഃ
- Marathi: यतो धर्मस्ततो जयः
- Meitei: ꯌꯇꯣ ꯙꯔꯃꯁꯇꯇꯣ ꯖꯌ꯫
- Odia: ଯତୋ ଧର୍ମସ୍ତତୋ ଜୟଃ
- Punjabi: ਯਤੋ ਧਰਮਸਤਤੋ ਜਯਃ
- Tamil: யதோ தர்மஸ்ததோ ஜய:
- Telugu: యతో ధర్మస్తతో జయః
- Urdu: یتو دھرم ستتو جئیہ
- Gujarati: યતો ધર્મસ્તતો જયઃ

Yato Dharmastato Jayaḥ (Sanskrit: यतो धर्मस्ततो जयः) is a Sanskrit shloka that occurs a total of 13 times in the Hindu epic, the Mahabharata. The phrase means "where there is dharma, there will be victory". It is also the official motto of the Supreme Court of India.

== Meaning ==
The phrase comes from the Mahabharata verse 13.153.39.

"उक्तवानस्मि दुर्बुद्धिं मन्दं दुर्योधनं पुरा ।

यतः कृष्णस्ततो धर्मो यतो धर्मस्ततो जयः ॥ ३९ ॥"

"uktavānasmi durbuddhiṃ mandaṃ duryodhanaṃ purā |

yataḥ kṛṣṇastato dharmo yato dharmastato jayaḥ || 39 ||"

- Yataḥ (यतो) = where/whence
- Dharmaḥ (धर्माह) = righteousness, duty, moral order
- Tataḥ (ततो) = there/then
- Jayaḥ (जयः) = victory

"...acts of good will. That foremost of righteous men then set himself to earn the substantial blessing of the Brahmanas, of the foremost military officers, and the leading citizens. The blessed monarch having passed fifty nights in the capital recollected..."

On the battlefield of Kurukshetra, during the Kurukshetra War, when Arjuna tries to shake the despondency of Yudhisthira; he states "victory is ensured for the side standing with Dharma". It occurs again when Gandhari, the mother of Kauravas, having lost all her sons in the war, utters it with the intent: "Where there is dharma, there is victory".

In the Mahabharata, Dharma represents cosmic order, ethics, and duty. The victory of the Pandavas over the Kauravas, despite being weaker, represents this theme.

== Reference in Hindu scriptures ==
The phrase is often complemented with another shloka in the Mahabharata. Dhritarashtra is warned using this phrase by Vyasa to discourage the unrighteous ways of his sons. It again occurs in the Stri Parva of Hindu Itihasa Mahabharata. It is also told by Bhishma to Duryodhana in Bhagavad Gita Parva. Yato Dharmastato Jayah occurs a total of eleven times in the Mahabharata.

In Karna-Upanivada Parva, Karna while accepting his mistakes in front of Krishna, also said this.

In Vidura Niti, when Dhritarashtra is interacting with Vidura, he uses this phrase. He says, "though I know that victory lies on the path of Dharma, even then I cannot forsake my son Duryodhana".

Dharma Viveka, a Sanskrit poem composed by Halayudhvi, ends with this phrase.

== In studies ==
In Bala Vihar, an educational activity for children, Chinmaya Mission uses this message to supplement the concept of Karma. Scholar Alf Hiltebeitel takes this up in detail in his study of Dharma and Bhagwat Gita. Before Alf, the scholar Sylvain Lévi is known to have studied this phrase in detail with varying interpretations. In an article of the Indian Defence Review journal, it is characterized as "best sums up the Indian thought", here meaning, "If we are righteous, then victory will be ours [India's]". In the study of ethics, it is taken to convey that "ultimate victory is that of righteousness".

== See also ==
- Dharma
- Karma
- Dharmo Rakshati Rakshitah, another shloka about dharma
