= Same-sex =

Same-sex, same-gender, same sex or same gender may refer to:

- A phrase used in the discussion of sex or gender
- Gonochorism, the state of having just one of at least two distinct sexes in any one individual organism
- Homosexuality, the romantic attraction, sexual attraction or sexual behavior between members of the same sex or gender
- Same-gender-loving, a term used by homosexual people in the African American community.
- Same-sex attracted, a phrase connected to the "ex-gay" movement promoting conversion therapy practices
- Same-sex education or same-gender education, the practice of conducting education where male and female students attend separate classes
- Same-sex marriage or same-gender marriage, the marriage between two people of the same sex or gender
- Same-sex relationship or same-gender relationship, a relationship between two persons of the same sex or gender, in diverse forms

== See also ==
- Opposite sex (disambiguation)
