= Iraqi opposition =

The Iraqi opposition can refer to three things:

- Pre-2003: Iraqi anti-Saddam groups were composed of a number of groups in Iraq opposed to the Saddam regime.
- Occupation era: The collective term usually denoting Iraqi insurgency opposed to the American-led coalition forces and Iraqi security forces during the occupation of Iraq that followed the Iraq War on May 1, 2003.
- Post-independence: After the handover of authority from the Coalition Provisional Authority to Iraqi leaders, the Iraqi opposition are the minority political parties and the Ba'athist insurgent groups.
