= Opposite sex =

Opposite sex may refer to:

- A phrase used in the discussion of sex or gender
- Dioecy, a characteristic of a species, meaning that it has distinct male and female individual organisms
- Heterosexuality, the romantic attraction, sexual attraction or sexual behavior between persons of the opposite sex or gender
- The Opposite Sex, a 1956 musical film, directed by David Miller
- The Opposite Sex (2014 film), directed by Jennifer Finnigan and Jonathan Silverman
- Opposite Sex (album), a 1995 album by the Vulgar Boatmen
- Opposite Sex (TV series), a 2000 TV series
- The Opposite Sex: Rene's Story and The Opposite Sex: Jamie's Story, a 2004 two-part story which is part of the Real Momentum documentary series

== See also ==
- The Opposite of Sex, a 1998 romantic comedy film, written and directed by Don Roos
  - The Opposite of Sex (musical), a 2004 musical based on the screenplay to the 1998 film
- Same sex (disambiguation)
