= Against =

Against may refer to:

- Against (album), 1998 album by Brazilian metal band Sepultura
  - "Against" (song) the title track song from the Sepultura album
- Against (American band), 2006 American thrash band
- Against (Australian band), Australian hardcore punk band
