= The House Opposite =

The House Opposite may refer to:

- The House Opposite (play), a play by Perceval Landon
  - The House Opposite (1917 film), a silent film adaptation directed by Walter West
- The House Opposite (novel), by Joseph Jefferson Farjeon
  - The House Opposite (1931 film), a sound film adaptation directed by Walter Summers
- The House Opposite (1937 film), a French comedy film
- The House Opposite, a book by G. W. Stonier
