= SOB X RBE =

American hip-hop group

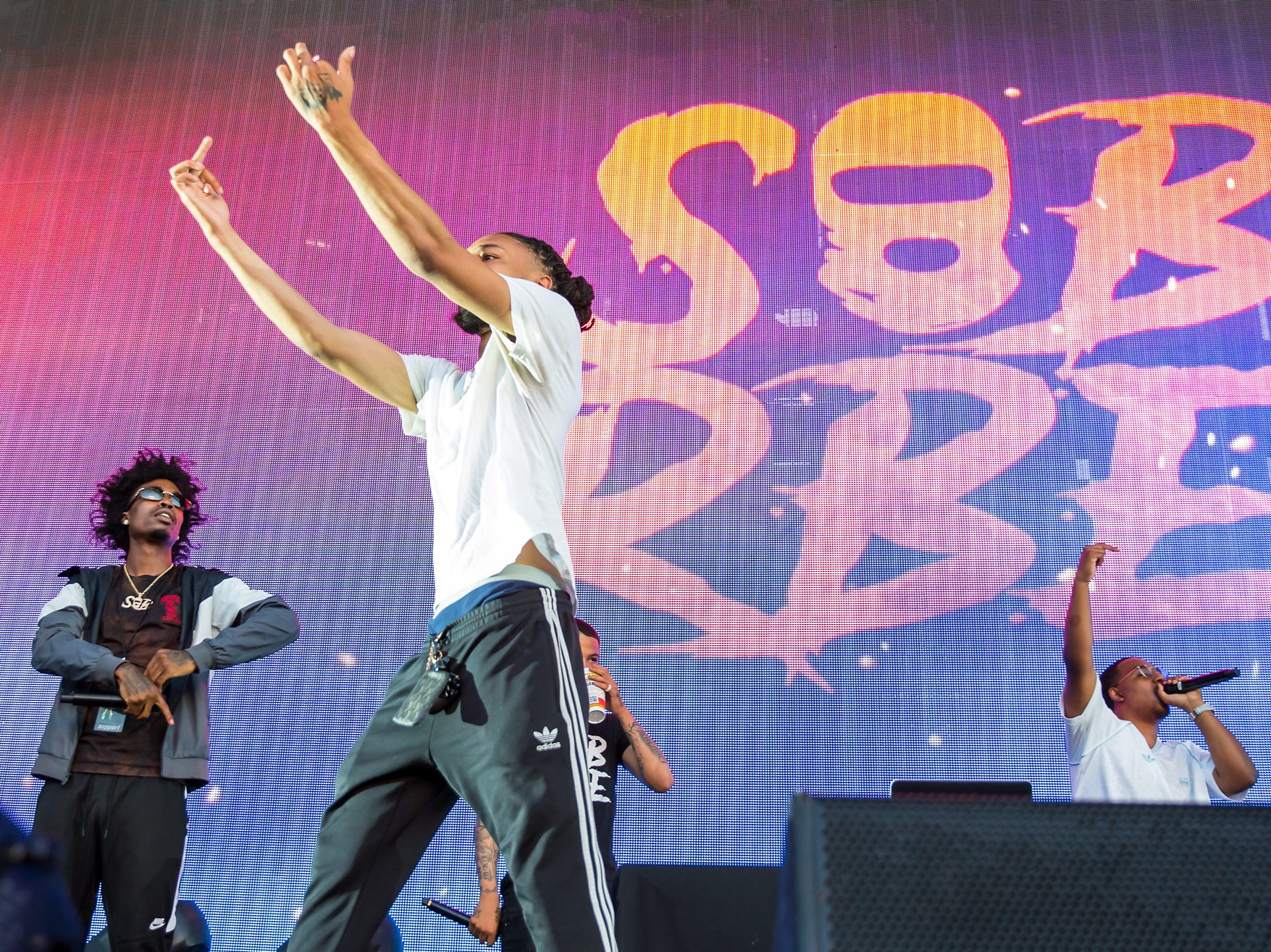
- SOB X RBE performing in June 2018

Background information
- Also known as: Strictly Only Brothers x Real Boi Entertainment
- Origin: Vallejo, California, U.S.
- Genres: West Coast hip-hop; hyphy
- Years active: 2016–2020, 2026-present
- Labels: Interscope; Def Jam; Empire
- Members: Yhung T.O.; Slimmy B; DaBoii
- Past members: Lul G
- Website: sobxrbe.com

SOB X RBE (an acronym of Strictly Only Brothers x Real Boi Entertainment) is an American hip-hop group founded in 2016. The group consisted of Slimmy B (Jabbar Brown), Yhung T.O. (Juwon Lee), DaBoii (Wayman Barrow), and Lul G (George Harris). The group met as teenagers in the Bay Area of California, with influence from West Coast figures in the area's hip-hop scene. They are best known for their 2018 song "Paramedic!," which entered the Billboard Hot 100 and was included on the Kendrick Lamar-curated Black Panther film soundtrack. The group disbanded the following year, mainly due to the incarceration of member Lul G, who was convicted of murdering 26-year-old Rashied Flowers in July 2019.

== Music career ==
As SOB x RBE gained momentum and exposure, in 2017 they caught the eye of Bay Area rapper Sage the Gemini who took the group under apprenticeship and had them be the opening act for his tour. He introduced the group to more prominent names in the music industry to help them gain more momentum. The group has released six complete projects: a self-titled mixtape in 2017, a debut album Gangin in 2018, an EP with Big Money, a second album Gangin II in late 2018, an EP with Marshmello, and an album "Family Not A Group" with producer Hit Boy. The group found mainstream attention after being featured on the track "Paramedic!" for the 2018 superhero film Black Panther. SOB X RBE worked with artists like Kendrick Lamar (Paramedic! on the Black Panther soundtrack), showcasing their influence and reach in the broader hip-hop scene. The group has gone on multiple tours around the United States and have been interviewed multiple times by The Fader and Billboard. The group is currently not signed to any recording label but, certain members in the group are signed to record labels as solo independent recording artist. They each have their own specific sound and history that makes them individuals and each group member has their own mixtapes and solo projects that they work on outside of the group. In an interview with DJ Vlad the group disclosed that despite musical differences they will always remain a "family" before a musical group. The group released the single "Ten Summers" in July 2026, following a 7 year hiatus. The group performed in their first reunion performance in August 2026.

== Biographies ==
=== Juwon Lee (Yhung T.O.) ===
Born on December 7, 1998, in Vallejo, California, Yhung T.O. has had a passion for making music since he was in middle school and essentially brought the group together as he was the one with the studio the men began recording their very first hits in. SOB x RBE was a merge of two pre-existing groups, Real Boi Entertainment (RBE) was Yhung T.O.'s musical group, starting as early as ninth grade. Yhung T.O. had gotten married at the age of nineteen and is still currently married. In March 2018 Yhung T.O. revealed his signing to the record label Interscope.Yhung T.O. was signed by Joie Manda in December 2017. The group expressed that they are still a family, though Yhung T.O. was signed as a solo artist to the label. His signing left fans with unanswered questions as to what is going to happen to the musical group in the long run. "We were all solo artists originally, so I feel like everybody's gonna take their own route as their careers go and get noticed for what they wanna be known for, and together as SOB X RBE, we can do that," "Even if we stopped rapping, it's still gonna be SOB X RBE 'cause we all family. My mom is they mom and vice-versa."

=== Wayman Barrow (DaBoii) ===
Born on August 14, 1997, in Vallejo, California, DaBoii also was making music since he could remember and at a very young age joined Yhung T.O. in his studio where they began to make music. The second half of the musical group's final merge was Strictly Only Brothers (SOB) and this was DaBoii's initial group. During an interview with the musical group, DaBoii revealed that he is known to be the most soft-spoken among the three and keeps very quiet around those he does not know well. While the group is known for their collaborative music, each member identifies themselves as an independent artist, with DaBoii also taking steps to sign with a record label. In December 2019, DaBoii announced on Instagram he has a son. DaBoii is known as the "soft-spoken" member of the group provides a unique contrast to the more outwardly vocal personalities within SOB X RBE. "We ain’t in competition but you gotta keep up,” All it take is one nigga to step up and be like, 'We gotta be on our shit,’ and that could be anybody.”

=== Jabbar Brown (Slimmy B) ===
Born on February 26, 1997, in Vallejo, California Slimmy B is the third active member of the musical group. Slimmy B's passion to pursue music also started very early on, just like the rest of the group. He attended Vallejo Middle School where he and DaBoii met and formed their relationship. In an interview, Slimmy B revealed that he had a son and before the group had gained exposure he was working at various wineries and warehouses in Vallejo, California to take care of his family. In an interview with the artists, it was revealed that among the three, Slimmy B seems to be the artist with all the jokes, he brings lightheartedness to the dynamic, often lifting the spirits of his collaborators.

=== George Harris (Lul G) ===
Born on November 14, 1998, in Vallejo, California Lul G is currently not an active member in the group as of late 2018. In the summer of 2018, Lul G signed to Def Jam Records as a solo artist, marking a significant milestone in his career. His solo work showcased his talents, and his association with the prominent label gave him a platform to expand his reach. KQED reported that the Fairfield Police Department, stated that a Lul G (George Harris) was charged for murder and arrested On September 21, 2019.

He is currently being held in the Stanton Correction Facility in Fairfield, California. Harris is being charged for in connection of the murder of Rashield Flowers a friend to the SOB x RBE and co-worker.

== Discography ==
=== Studio albums ===
List of studio albums, with selected chart positions
| Title | Album details | Peak chart positions |
| Title | Album details | US |
|---|---|---|
| Gangin | Released: February 23, 2018; Label: Empire; Format: Digital download | 74 |
| Gangin II | Released: September 28, 2018; Label: Empire; Format: Digital download | 191 |
| Family Not a Group (with Hit-Boy) | Released: April 16, 2019; Label: Def Jam; Format: Digital download | |
| Strictly Only Brothers | Released: December 20, 2019; Label: Empire; Format: Digital download | |
| From The Land | Released: November 6, 2026; Label: SOB X RBE, Empire; Format: Digital download | |

=== Mixtapes ===
List of mixtapes, with selected details
| Title | Details |
|---|---|
| SOB X RBE | Released: January 23, 2017; Label: Self-released; Format: Digital download |

=== Extended plays ===
List of extended plays, with selected details
| Title | Details |
|---|---|
| Tutuland (with Big Money) | Released: May 26, 2018; Label: Empire; Format: Digital download |
| Roll the Dice (with Marshmello) | Released: April 11, 2019; Label: Joytime Collective; Formats: Digital download |

=== Charted songs ===
| Title | Year | Peak chart positions | | Album |
| Title | Year | US | UK | Album |
|---|---|---|---|---|
| "Paramedic!" | 2018 | 67 | 80 | Black Panther: The Album |

=== Singles ===
List of singles, showing year released and album
| Title | Year | Album |
|---|---|---|
| "Anti" | 2017 | SOB X RBE |
| "Damn" | 2017 | Non-album single |
| "Once Upon a Time" | 2018 | Gangin |
| "I'm Up Now" | 2018 | Non-album single |
| "Vibes" | 2018 | Gangin II |
| "Rich" | 2019 | Non-album single |
| "Legend" | 2019 | Strictly Only Brothers |
| "Doggy Dog World" | 2019 | Non-album single |
| "Sensei" | 2019 | Strictly Only Brothers |
| "Ten Summers" | 2026 | TBA |
