= Christina Tosi =

American chef, author and TV personality (born 1981)

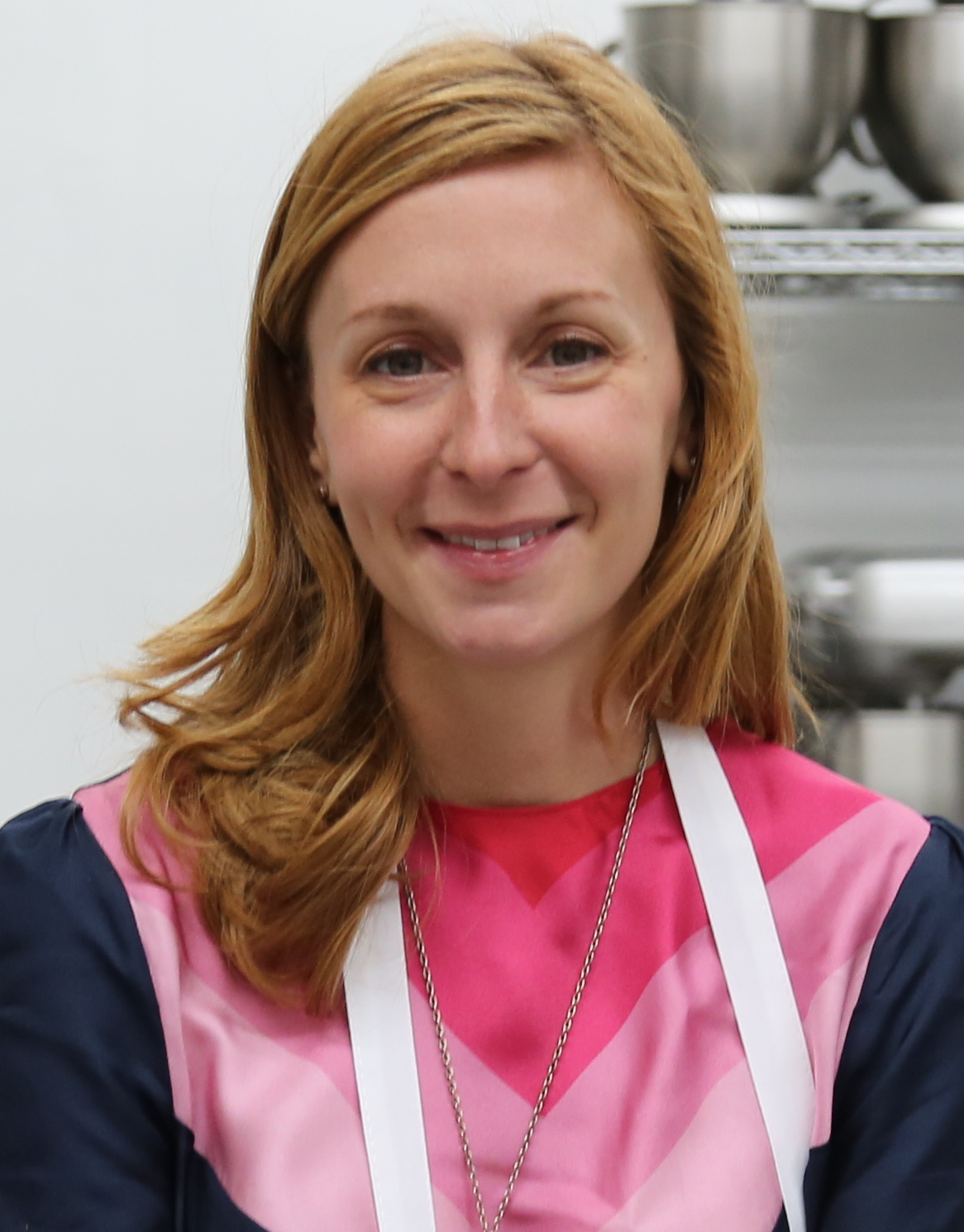
- Tosi in 2013
- Born: 1981 (age 44–45); Berea, Ohio, U.S.
- Education: University of Virginia; James Madison University; French Culinary Institute
- Occupations: Chef; television presenter; author
- Spouse: Will Guidara (m. 2016)
- Children: 2
- Culinary career
- Cooking style: Pastry, dessert, French, Italian, Southern American cuisine
- Website: christinatosi.com

Christina Tosi (born 1981) is an American chef and cookbook author. She is founder and co-owner with Momofuku of Milk Bar and serves as its chef and chief executive officer. She also created Milk Bar Pie and Cereal Milk. Food & Wine magazine included her in their 2014 list of "Most Innovative Women in Food and Drink".

She is the author of several cookbooks. She has served as a judge on the reality competition MasterChef and presented for the Netflix series Bake Squad. She has won two James Beard Foundation Awards.

== Early life and education ==
Tosi was born in 1981 in Berea, Ohio; her father, Gino Tosi, was an agricultural economist and her mother managing partner in an accounting firm. The couple divorced while Tosi was a teenager, and she was raised primarily in Springfield, Virginia. She has an older sister, Angela. Tosi recalls not being allowed to say "I can't" or "I'm bored".

Her interest in baking dates to her childhood; both of her grandmothers are "avid bakers", according to Tosi. Her parents were both fond of sweets. She ran track in high school and still runs regularly. She was interested in math and foreign languages. In college she worked serving tables and then as a prep cook and baker.

Tosi studied electrical engineering for one year at the University of Virginia and graduated from James Madison University with degrees in applied mathematics and Italian, then enrolled in the French Culinary Institute's pastry arts program. While attending culinary school she worked as a host at Aquagrill, eventually being promoted to maître d’hotel.

== Culinary career ==
Tosi went to New York and worked at Bouley, interned at Saveur, and then worked at wd~50. She found the exacting plating required in fine dining wasn't something she enjoyed and decided she didn't want to work as an executive pastry chef in fine dining restaurants. Tosi had in 2005 helped to write wd~50s Hazard Analysis Critical Control Point plan. On the recommendation of Wylie Dufresne, David Chang hired Tosi in 2005 at Momofuku to create a plan for Momofuku, which had just discovered they needed such a plan to cook with a vacuum-sealing system. Chang hired Tosi to create the plan, then eventually to do other administrative work and liaise with the NYC Department of Health. According to the New York Times the job was "so loosely defined" that her duties were described as "et cetera". Now not baking professionally, Tosi started baking at home again and brought her homebaked items in for other staff. Chang eventually moved her to a position developing and overseeing the restaurant group's pastry program.

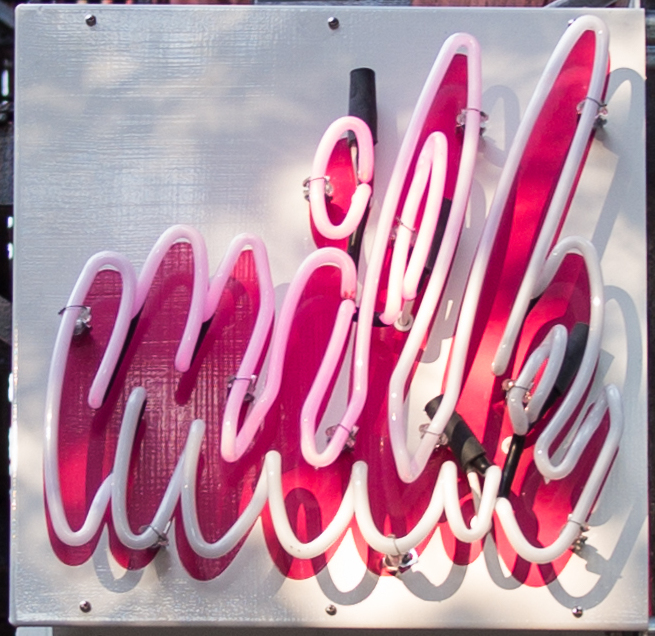
Logo designed by Tosi by typing 'milk' in Brush Script Medium.

There were no desserts on Chang's menu when Tosi came on board, and she created her own pastries inspired by the flavors of childhood favorites, developing recipes such as Cereal Milk-flavored panna cotta. In 2008, a space next door to Momofuku Ssam Bar's became available, and Chang encouraged Tosi to open her own shop, which she named Milk Bar. Tosi created the original logo herself by simply typing 'milk' in Brush Script Medium.

Milk Bar first opened its doors on November 15, 2008. When they first opened, Milk Bar had a team of only five people and were often open for 16 hours a day. Tosi's approach was to use pastry chef techniques to create comfort-food influenced desserts served in a casual setting. She serves as Milk Bar's chef and chief executive officer.

=== Culinary influence ===
She developed recipes such as Cereal Milk, Compost Cookies, Crack Pie (now known as Milk Bar Pie) and Candy Bar Pie.

In 2017 Ben & Jerry's introduced a line of flavors that Eater called a [blatant ripoff] of Tosi's Cereal Milk.

According to the New York Times in 2021, "Nothing bears the trademark of the pastry chef Christina Tosi more than her cereal milk flavor." According to the Seattle Times in 2022, Tosi is "often credited with starting the soft-serve craze in restaurants".

Axios in 2022 called Tosi's cereal milk and crack pie creations "cult favorites". Francis Fabricant said Tosi "made Cereal Milk soft-serve and the Compost Cookie household names".

== Books ==
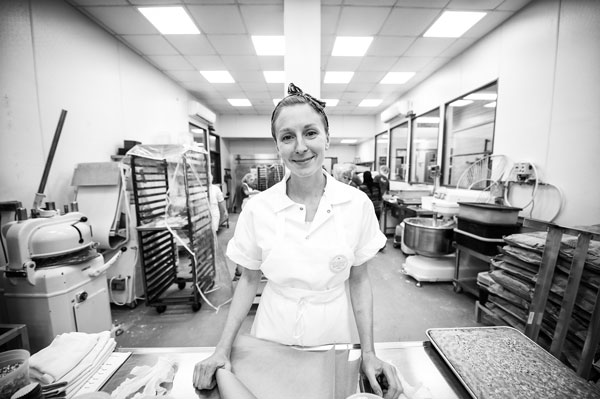
Tosi at Hot Bread Kitchen in 2012

Tosi has written several cookbooks and a memoir.

Tosi's Momofuku Milk Bar (2011), a cookbook containing recipes from the restaurant, was published by Clarkson Potter. Susan Chang in The Washington Post called it "a hard-core baking book, dense with text, full of sub-recipes", recipes which are ingredients for the main recipe and need to be prepared prior to preparing the main recipe. Melanie Haupt in the Austin Chronicle agreed that preparation of some of the recipes was "a massive pain" to prepare due to the many sub-recipes required.

Tosi's Milk Bar Life (2015) was published by Random House. Washington Post reviewer Chang said "There’s something intellectually provocative about 'Milk Bar Life,' with its mad juxtapositions of Fruity Pebbles and slow-simmered sauces", but that "after the chemical party in your mouth subsides, you might just find yourself longing for a poached pear". Jenny Rosenstrach of the New York Times Book Review wrote of her second book, "It's impossible not to be charmed by the chatty Tosi and her hot pink and bubble-letter-filled never-never land..."

Tosi's Dessert Can Save the World (2022) was described by Publishers Weekly as a "clumpy mix of memoir and self-help", saying that "Despite the delicious premise, the filling leaves much to be desired."

== Media ==
Tosi joined the judging panel of MasterChef on Fox beginning with its sixth season, which premiered May 20, 2015, as well as the fourth season of MasterChef Junior, which premiered November 6, 2015. In April 2018 she was featured in an episode of Chef's Table: Pastry. She has presented for the Netflix series Bake Squad and been a judge on Chopped. In 2024, she appeared as herself in season 3 of The Bear.

At the beginning of the COVID-19 pandemic, Tosi launched Bake Club, a virtual space where participants could bake alongside her daily.

Tosi has made advertising appearances for Subaru, American Express, Kellogg's, Estée Lauder, and Verizon.

== Recognition ==
In 2014 Food and Wine Magazine named Tosi to their list of "Most Innovative Women in Food and Drink". The New York Times. called her Cereal Milk "the brilliant idea of making soft-serve from the milk at the bottom of a cereal bowl."

Tosi received the James Beard Foundation award for Rising Star Chef of the Year for her work at Milk Bar in 2012, the first pastry chef to do so. In 2015, she received the James Beard Outstanding Pastry Chef award. In 2016, Crain's New York Business included Tosi in their annual list of the top 40 business persons working in New York City who are under the age of 40.

== Personal life ==
The New York Times describes Tosi as "an introvert in overalls who carries math problems in her purse, along with embroidery thread to make friendship bracelets". She makes popsicle stick art and runs daily.

On July 30, 2016, Tosi married New York City-based restaurateur Will Guidara, co-owner of Eleven Madison Park. In March 2021, the couple had a daughter. They lived in a Flatiron penthouse which according to the New York Times they purchased in 2016 for $3.7 million. The penthouse was eventually sold in October 2022 for $4.4 million.

== Bibliography ==
- Momofuku Milk Bar. with Courtney McBroom. New York: Clarkson Potter. 2011. ISBN 978-0-30772-049-8. OCLC 701017680.
- Milk Bar Life. with Courtney McBroom. HarperCollins. 2015. ISBN 978-0-77043-510-3. OCLC 894128623.
- All About Cake. HarperCollins. 2018. ISBN 978-0451499523. OCLC 1010585118.
- Milk Bar: Kids Only. Clarkson Potter. 2020. ISBN 978-0593231937. OCLC 1153337826.
- Every Cake Has a Story. Penguin Young Readers Group. 2021. ISBN 9780593110683. OCLC 1237101198.
- Dessert Can Save The World. Harmony. 2022. ISBN 978-0593231944. OCLC 1302597750.
- All About Cookies. Henry Hargreaves. New York. 2022. ISBN 978-0-593-23197-5. OCLC 1290721306.
