= Momofuku (restaurants) =

Culinary brand

Momofuku Group
- Industry: Culinary
- Founded: 2004 in New York City, New York, United States
- Founder: David Chang
- Key people: David Chang
- Products: Momofuku Noodle Bar; Momofuku Ssäm Bar; Momofuku Ko

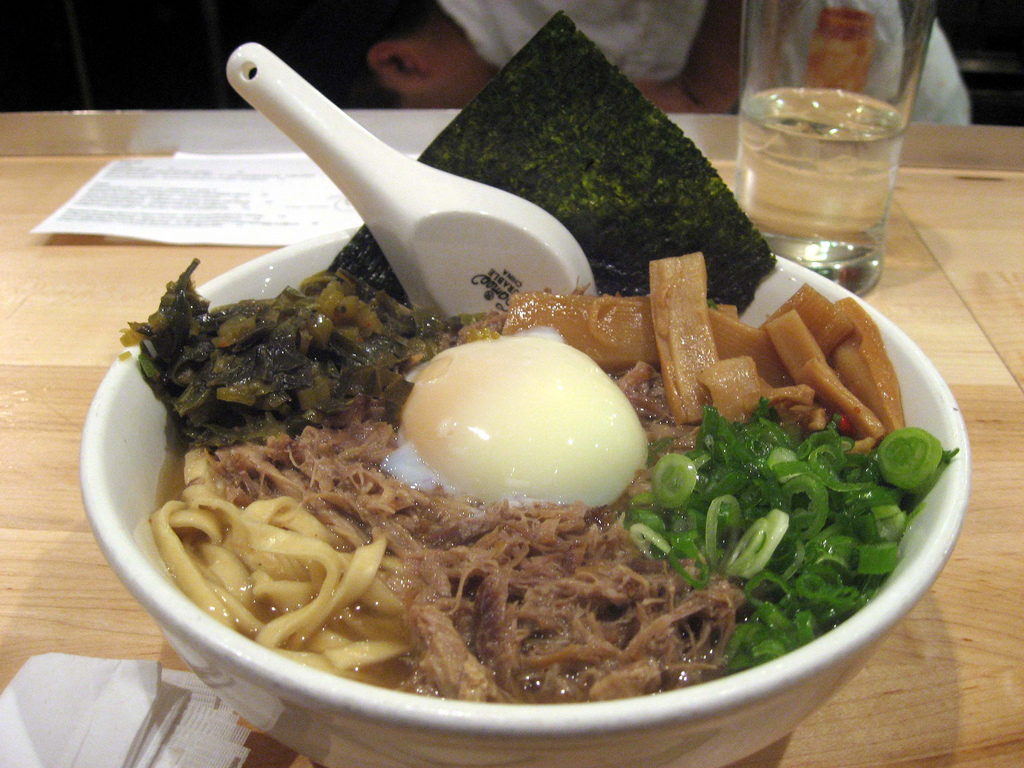
Pork ramen from New York restaurant Momofuku Noodle Bar

Momofuku is a culinary brand established by chef David Chang in 2004 with the opening of Momofuku Noodle Bar. It includes restaurants in New York City, Toronto (defunct), Las Vegas, and Los Angeles. Its various restaurants are called Noodle Bar, Ssäm Bar, Ko, Má Pêche (defunct), Seiōbo, Noodle Bar Toronto (defunct), Kōjin, Fuku, Fuku+, CCDC, Nishi, Ando, Las Vegas, Fuku Wall St, Kāwi, Kabawa, and Bar Kabawa. The company also runs a bakery established by pastry chef Christina Tosi (Milk Bar), a bar (Nikai), and a quarterly magazine (Lucky Peach).

Chang has written that the name "Momofuku" is "an indirect nod" to Momofuku Ando, the Japanese-Taiwanese inventor of instant ramen. The name means "lucky peach." Chang has suggested it is not an accident that he chose a word that sounds similar to the curse word "motherfucker".

== History ==
With experience in restaurants in New York City, Chef David Chang opened up his first restaurant in 2004, Momofuku Noodle Bar. It was influenced by his time spent working in Japan and visiting ramen shops. After about a year of trials, Noodle Bar took off as a success when the chefs began cooking what they felt like. Growing, Noodle Bar eventually moved up the street, and Momofuku Ko took over the space.

Momofuku Ssäm Bar opened after Noodle Bar and originally had the concept of an Asian-style burrito bar (ssam is Korean for wrap). After experiencing troubles, Chang and his cohorts decided to change the style of the menu, away from the burrito-centered cuisine. This change led Ssäm Bar to success, as it received two stars (eventually three) from The New York Times.

The third restaurant to open was Momofuku Ko. Chang describes the idea behind Ko as a "cook-centric restaurant with just a few stools, a collaborative kitchen, and a constantly changing menu." Má Pêche was the fourth restaurant to open and the first to open outside of the East Village neighborhood.

Momofuku Seiōbo in October 2011 was the first restaurant to open outside of the U.S. In January 2012, Momofuku opened the cocktail bar Booker & Dax in the back of Ssäm Bar in collaboration with Dave Arnold. Momofuku Toronto followed in 2012 alongside the opening of the Shangri-La Hotel. Fuku, a chicken sandwich restaurant, opened in the original Noodle Bar location in June 2015.

Doing office work for Ssäm Bar at the time, pastry chef Christina Tosi began the desserts program at the three Momofuku restaurants, first at Ssäm Bar, then Noodle Bar, and then Ko.

The first Momofuku Milk Bar started in the laundromat next to Ssäm Bar. After a year and a half, a second Milk Bar opened in Midtown, in the Chambers Hotel. In November 2010 the Williamsburg, Brooklyn kitchen opened to accommodate the growth of Milk Bar. On September 24, 2011, Milk Bar opened its fourth location on the Upper West Side of Manhattan. In March 2012, Milk Bar opened a fifth location in Carroll Gardens, Brooklyn, and its most recent, sixth, location opened in SOHO in September 2014.

In April 2018, Momofuku signed a deal with Kraft Heinz to start selling their chili sauce in American grocery stores.

== Restaurants ==
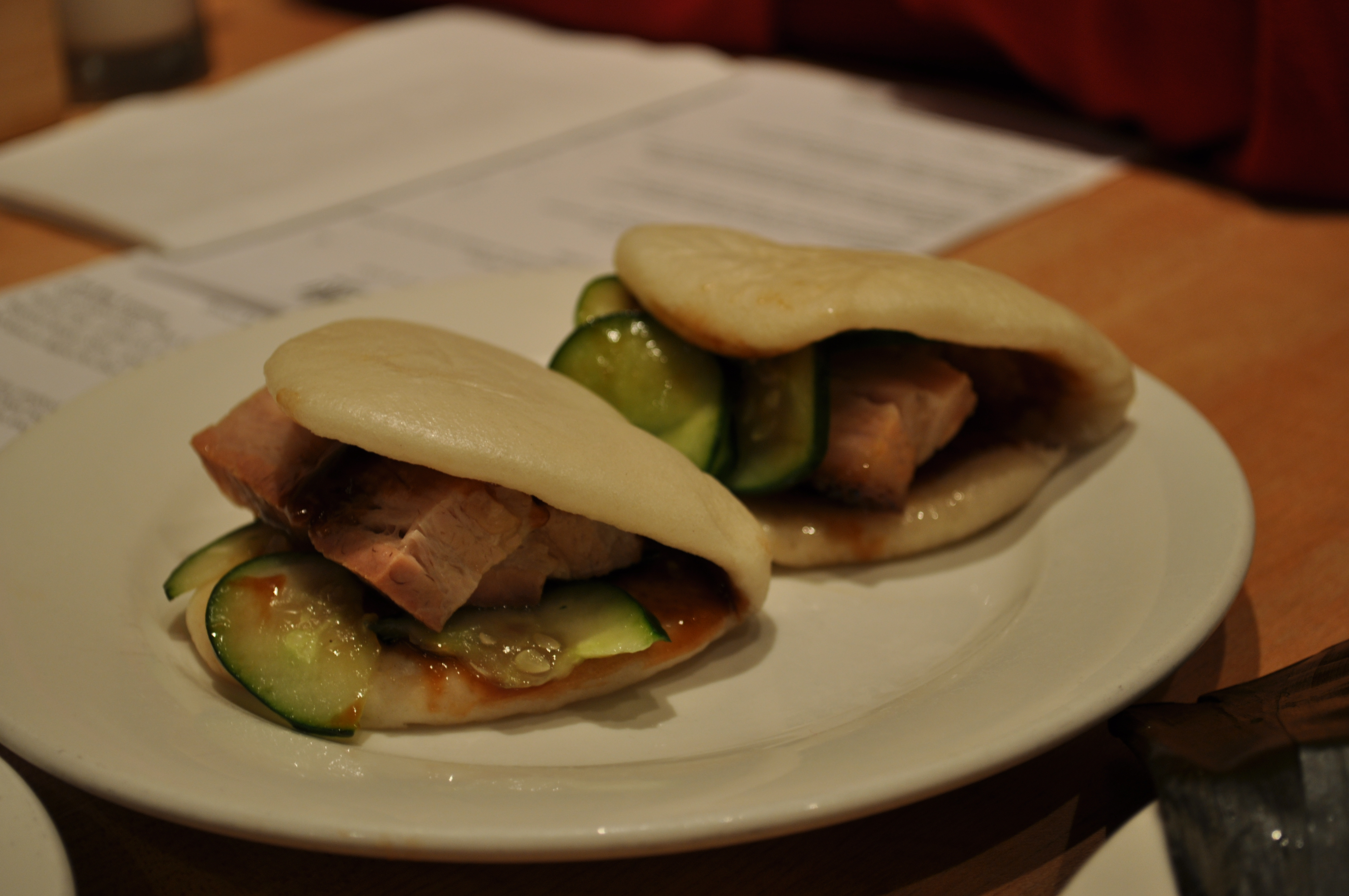
Momofuku's signature Gua bao dish

Momofuku Noodle Bar was the first Momofuku restaurant; it opened in August 2004. It serves ramen, seasonal dishes, and a variety of buns.

Since opening in 2006, Momofuku Ssäm Bar has been listed as one of The World's 50 Best Restaurants for 2009, 2010, 2011, 2012. Weekday lunches feature an all-rotisserie duck menu. Booker and Dax (the bar at Ssäm) is open late serving drinks.

Momofuku Ko operated from March 2008 until November 2023. At Momofuku Ko (ko means "child of"), guests sat along a kitchen counter and were served by the cooks. Dinner was a set tasting menu devised by the chef, Sean Gray, and his aides-de-cuisine. It was usually about 10 courses long; at lunch the menu stretched out to 16 courses. Momofuku Ko has earned two Michelin stars in its first year, which it retained until it closed in 2023. In 2010, Ko was number 70 on the San Pellegrino World's Best Restaurants list. The closure of Momofuku Ko was announced in October 2023, with its last day in operation on November 4, 2023.

Ma Pêche ("mother peach") is in Midtown Manhattan in the Chambers Hotel. Má Pêche opened in 2010 with co-owner and executive chef, Tien Ho, with Chef Paul Carmichael taking the reins in October 2011. This change prompted a shift in Má Pêche's cuisine from French-Vietnamese to American. Má Pêche includes a midtown outpost of Christina Tosi's bakery, Momofuku Milk Bar.

Fuku is a casual chicken concept by Momofuku. Originally started as a fried chicken sandwich joint, Fuku has since grown to serve various chicken and seasonal offerings, along with beer, slushies, and more. Fuku has locations in the East Village, Wall St, Madison Square Garden, Citi Field, T-Mobile Park in Seattle, and the Seaport in South Boston.

Seiōbo is Momofuku's first restaurant outside of New York City. In Sydney, it opened at The Star Casino in late October 2011. "Seiōbo" (Japanese: 西王母) is the Japanese pronunciation for the traditional Chinese "goddess of the West", who is known in mythical stories, such as Journey to the West, as owning the celestial peach orchards. Momofuku Seiōbo has two hats from The Sydney Morning Herald Good Food Guide and was named Best New Restaurant.

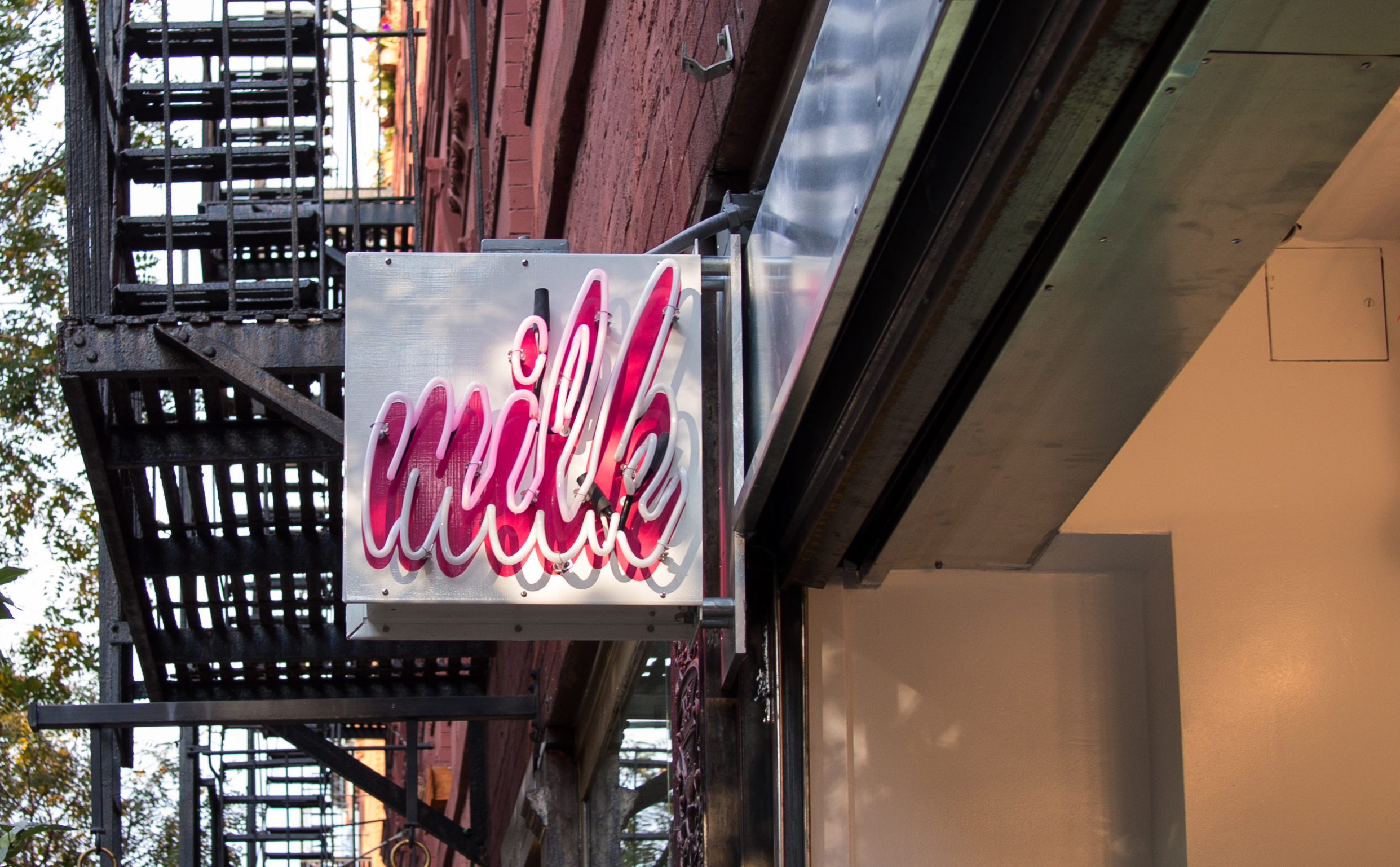
Milk Bar Nolita sign

In 2012, David Chang opened Momofuku Toronto, Momofuku's first location in Canada. It was located in a three-story glass cube on University Avenue in Downtown Toronto and was home to Noodle Bar, Nikai, Daishō and Shōtō. Noodle Bar was on the ground floor and was a sister-restaurant to that of the same name in New York City. The menu featured bowls of ramen and a roster of dishes like steamed buns and rice cakes. The restaurant was home to a custom piece of art created by Steve Keene. Nikai was a bar and lounge on the second floor of Momofuku Toronto. The menu featured cocktails, beer, wine, and sake. Guests could order items from both the Noodle Bar and Daishō menus. Daishō was located on the third floor. The menu featured large-format meals meant for parties of 4–10 guests and an à la carte menu that included dishes to share. Shōtō was in the Daishō dining room on the third floor. Shōtō served a roughly 10-course tasting menu that was based on market availability. Guests were seated along the counter and served by the chefs. Momofuku Toronto closed permanently in 2022.

Chang opened Momofuku CCDC, his first restaurant in the Washington, D.C. area in October 2015 in the downtown CityCenterDC development. The restaurant included a Milkbar location. The location closed permanently in 2020 as part of a larger restructuring.

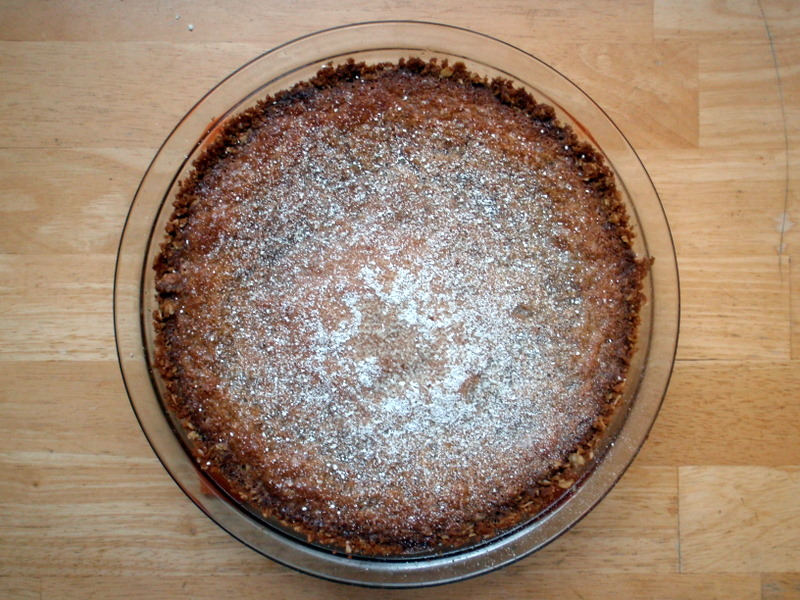
Milk Bar Pie, a Momofuku Milk Bar original recipe that appears in its first cookbook

Momofuku Milk Bar, under the direction of pastry chef Christina Tosi, is based in New York City and has several locations in the cities of Washington and Toronto.

Momofuku Nishi (which means "west") opened in January 2016 and is Momofuku's first restaurant on the west side. In New York City's Chelsea neighborhood, guests can choose from à la carte offerings for lunch or dinner.

Momofuku Las Vegas is Momofuku's first restaurant in the western U.S. It is inside of The Cosmopolitan of Las Vegas. The menu draws influence from all over the world, including the U.S., Korea, and Japan. The constantly evolving menu features steamed buns, noodles, and meat and seafood meant for sharing.

Kabawa, opened in the East Village in New York City, is a restaurant associated with Momofuku that opened in 2025. The chef, Paul Carmichael, was previously the executive chef at the aforementioned Seiōbo in Sydney. The tasting menu served is Pan-Caribbean, primarily with Bajan influences due to the chef's background, along with Puerto Rican and others. The restaurant was most recently ranked #1 on the New York Times Top 100 for 2026. Next door is their sister restaurant, Bar Kabawa, a more casual a la carte space with rum-based cocktails.

== Publications ==
In 2009, David Chang, Peter Meehan, Gabriele Stabile and the Momofuku team produced the Momofuku cookbook. It features recipes and photographs from Momofuku Noodle Bar, Momofuku Ssam Bar, Momofuku Ko, and Milk Bar. The cookbook was a New York Times Best Seller.

Written by Christina Tosi with a foreword by David Chang, the Momofuku Milk Bar cookbook was released in October 2011. Christina Tosi included her recipes for Cereal Milk, Crack Pie, the Compost Cookie, and other popular Milk Bar desserts.

Scraps is a limited edition collection of outtakes and artwork from the Momofuku cookbook photographer, Gabriele Stabile.

=== Lucky Peach ===
From 2011 to November 2013, Lucky Peach, a quarterly journal of food writing, was published by McSweeney's. Since then, it has been self-published. Lucky Peach was then created by David Chang, Peter Meehan, and Zero Point Zero production.

The first issue of Lucky Peach centered on ramen. The second issue, "The Sweet Spot", included articles on the neurobiology of how the brain detects sweet foods. This issue was a New York Times Best Seller. The third issue, "Chefs and Cooks", was also a New York Times Best Seller.

The fourth issue of Lucky Peach was about American food. The fifth issue was about Chinatown and was released in November 2012. The sixth issue was centered on the theme of the apocalypse and was published in January 2013. The seventh issue of Lucky Peach was about travel. Released in May 2013, the issue featured one of Christopher Boffoli's "Big Appetites" photographs as its cover image. The eighth issue centered on the idea of gender in the food world.

In March 2017, Lucky Peach announced it would cease publication after printing a double issue in the fall of 2017. Meehan stated that the shuttering of the publication was due to its partners' differences in creative direction and financial strategy.

== Controversy ==
In March 2024, Momofuku filed with the United States Patent and Trademark Office to trademark the phrases "chili crunch" and "chile crunch". As of early April, the company has not been awarded the trademark. Coinciding with the filing, Momofuku began issuing cease and desist letters to a variety of businesses, most of which are small, using the phrases. This move was negatively received by a number of food businesses. In a statement to the LA Times, Momofuku argued that the trademark was not intended to stifle any competition surrounding the sauces, stating that "When we created our product, we wanted a name we could own and intentionally picked ‘Chili Crunch’ to further differentiate it from the broader chili crisp category." On April 12, Chang issued a public apology regarding the issue on his podcast, The Dave Chang Show, stating that Momofuku had not intended to upset with their legal actions, and noted that Momofuku would no longer attempt to enforce the trademark.

== Awards and honors ==
- 2009, 2010, 2011, 2012, 2013 San Pellegrino World's 50 Best Restaurants: Momofuku Ssam Bar
- 2011, 2012, 2013 San Pellegrino World's 50 Best Restaurants: Momofuku Ko
- 2011, 2012, 2013, 2014 Michelin Guide: Momofuku Ssäm Bar and Momofuku Noodle Bar, Michelin Bib Gourmands Guide to NYC
- 2008 James Beard Awards: David Chang (momofuku ssäm bar), Best Chef New York City
- 2009 New York Magazine Where to Eat Momofuku Ko and Momofuku Milk Bar
- 2009 James Beard Awards: Momofuku Ko, Best New Restaurant New York City
- 2009 Zagat Survey: Momofuku Ko, Best Newcomer
- 2009 Michelin Guide: Momofuku Ko, 2 Stars
- 2010 Time Out New York Eat Out Awards: Momofuku Noodle Bar, Best Fried Chicken
- 2011 Time Out New York Food and Drink Awards: David Chang, Empire Builder of the Year
- 2011 James Beard Awards: Christina Tosi (Momofuku Milk Bar), Rising Star Chef of the Year (nominated)
- 2011 New York Magazine: Momofuku Ko, The Five Most Influential Restaurants of the Past Six Years
- 2012 James Beard Awards: Christina Tosi (Momofuku Milk Bar), Rising Star Chef of the Year
- 2012 James Beard Awards: David Chang (Momofuku Ssäm Bar), Outstanding Chef (nominated)
- 2012 Time Out Sydney: Momofuku Seiōbo, Restaurant of the Year 2012
- 2013 James Beard Awards: David Chang (Momofuku Noodle Bar), Outstanding Chef
- 2013 Bon Appétit: Momofuku Restaurant Group, most important restaurant in America
- 2013 Toronto Life: Momofuku Shōtō, Best New Toronto Restaurants, #1
- 2013 Toronto Life: Momofuku Daishō, Best New Toronto Restaurants, #3
- 2013 Gourmet Traveller: Momofuku Seiōbō, Restaurant of the Year
- 2014 James Beard Awards: David Chang (Momofuku), Who's Who in Food & Beverage

== See also ==
- List of noodle restaurants
- Momofuku Ando
- Japanese cuisine
- Korean cuisine
