= Milk Bar (bakery) =

Restaurant chain

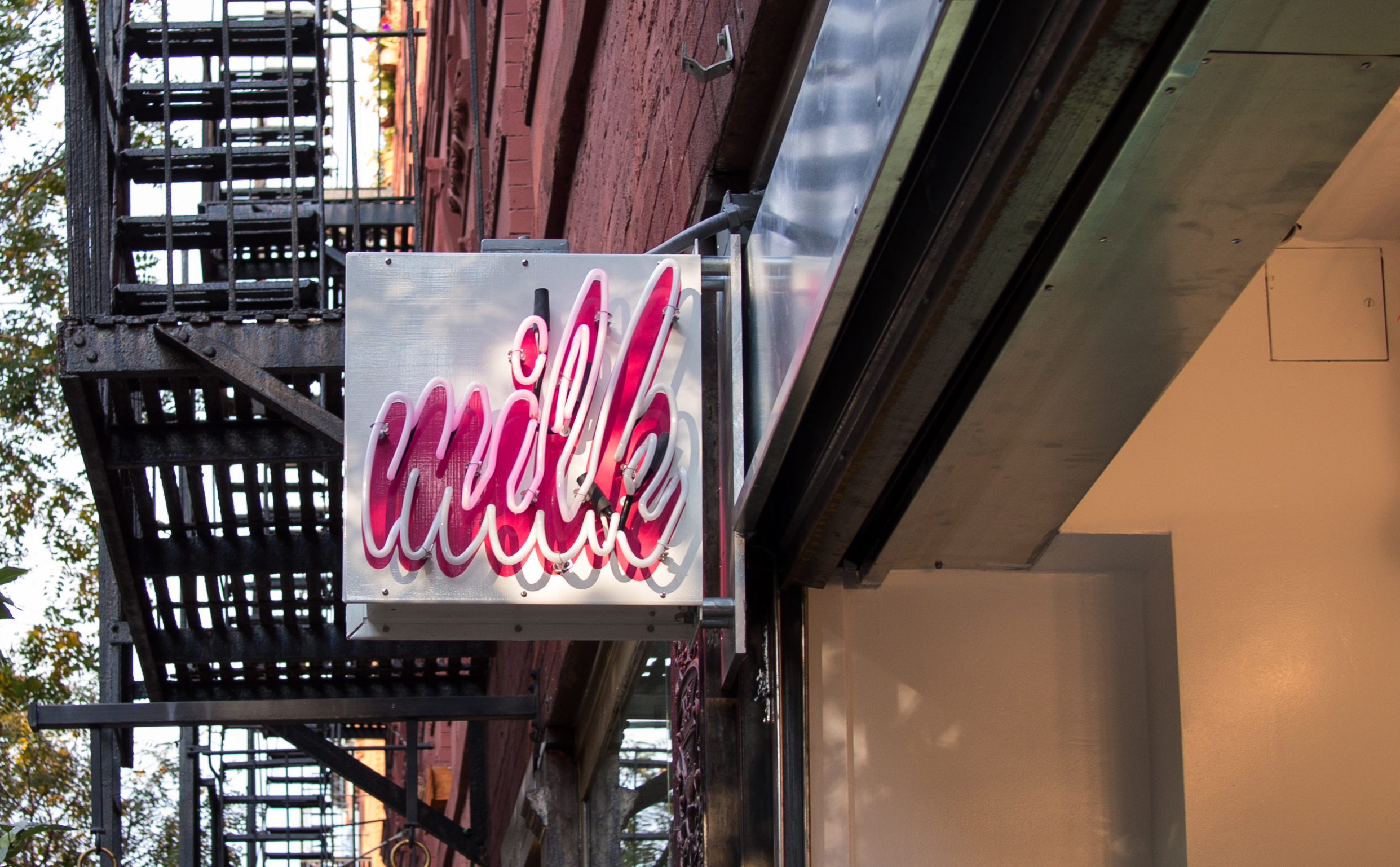
- Milk Bar Nolita

Restaurant information
- Established: November 15, 2008; 18 years ago in New York City
- Owners: Christina Tosi; Momofuku Group
- Head chef: Christina Tosi
- Food type: Bakery
- Location: New York
- Other locations: Los Angeles; Washington, D.C.; Las Vegas; Bellevue, Washington; Chicago
- Website: milkbarstore.com

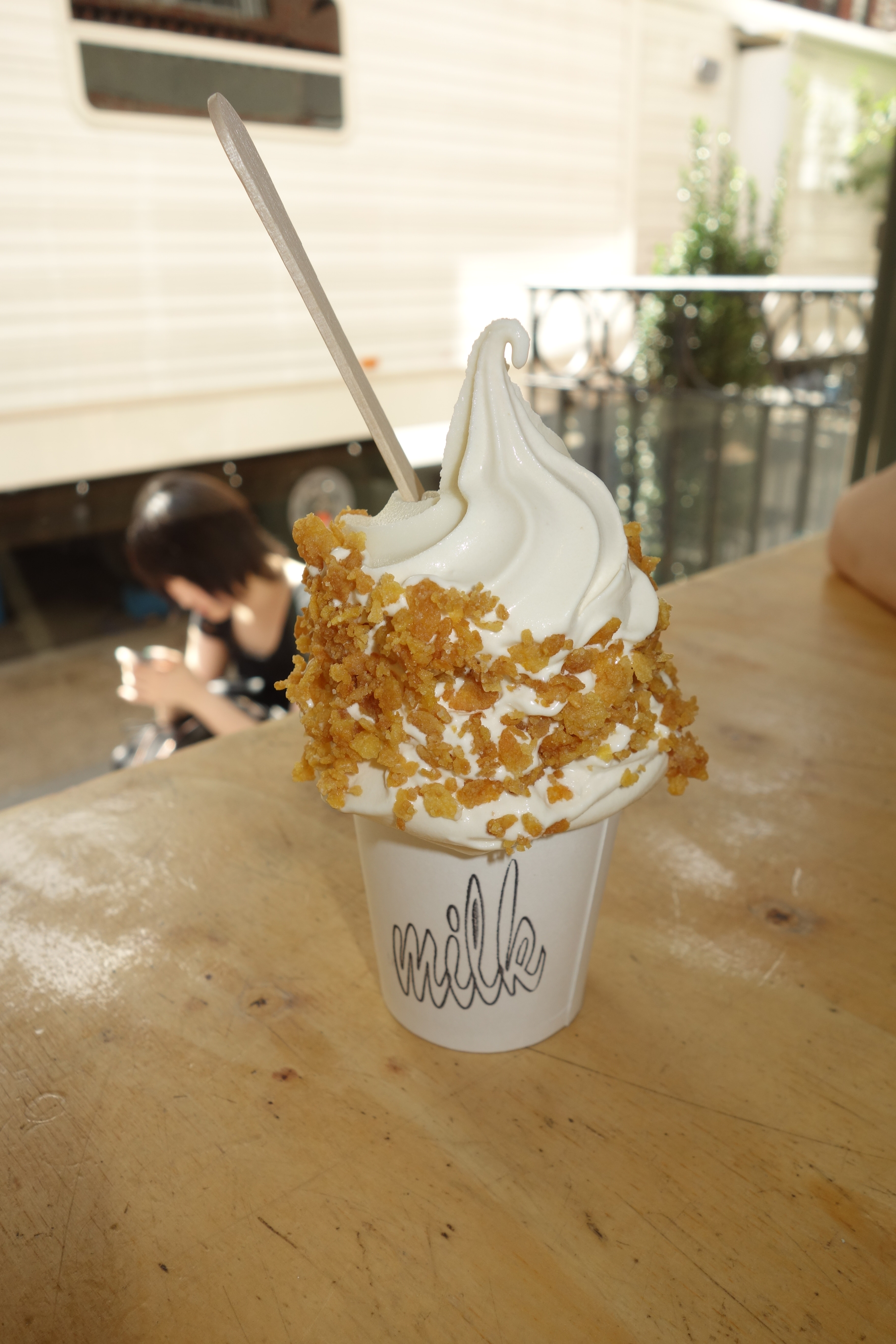
Cereal Milk-flavored soft serve topped with cornflakes

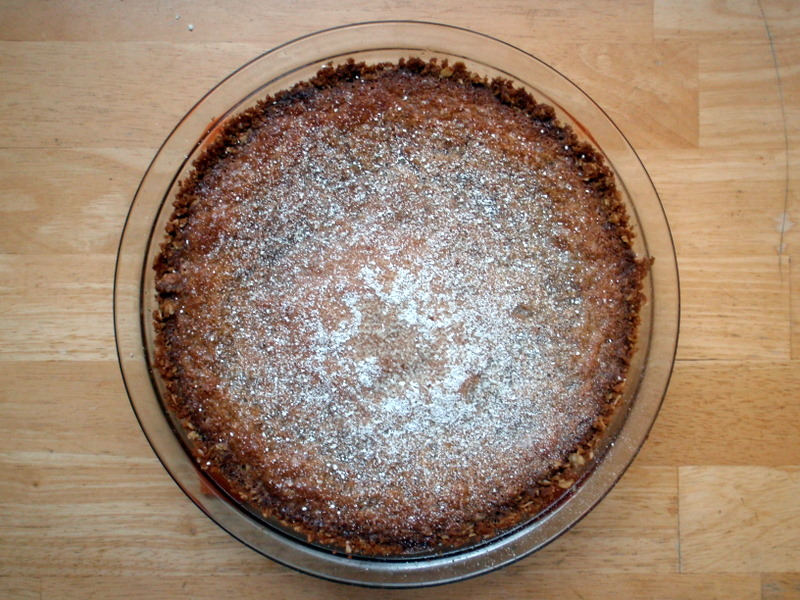
Milk Bar Pie

Milk Bar (originally Momofuku Milk Bar) is a chain of dessert and bakery restaurants in the United States, founded in New York City by chef Christina Tosi. As of 2024, the chain has branches in New York City; Los Angeles; Washington, D.C.; Las Vegas; Bellevue, Washington, and Chicago.

Tosi began and as of 2018 still owns the chain along with investors. She is the primary recipe developer of Milk Bar's products.

== History ==
Christina Tosi was working as pastry chef for David Chang's Momofuku restaurants in 2008 when Momofuku's Ssäm Bar decided to expand into a neighboring vacant laundromat; Tosi proposed the idea to add a bakery. Chang provided seed money, and the first Momofuku Milk Bar opened in November 2008. Tosi created the logo herself in Brush Script Medium.

By 2012, Milk Bar had discontinued the use of "Momofuku" in its name and was operating several locations in New York City in addition to the original bakery in Manhattan's East Village. Since then, it opened locations in Toronto, Washington, D.C., the Cosmopolitan of Las Vegas, Los Angeles, Boston, Vancouver and Bellevue, Washington (near Seattle). The Toronto, Boston, and Vancouver locations later closed.

As of February 2019, Milk Bar employed 381 people at its various locations and the management team was almost all women.

In 2019, Milk Bar changed the name of its signature Crack Pie to Milk Bar Pie, following criticism in the Boston Globe and other press concerning its allusion to the addictiveness of crack cocaine.

In spring 2020, Milk Bar began to sell cookies through online and national retail food stores.

Milk Bar operates separately from Momofuku, although as of 2019 Chang remains a business partner. In 2017, the bakery received a $10 million investment from venture capital fund RSE Ventures.

== Publications ==
Several cookbooks featuring recipes from the restaurant have been released, including Momofuku Milk Bar (2011), Milk Bar Life: Recipes & Stories (2015), Milk Bar: All About Cake (2018), Milk Bar: Kids Only (2020), and Every Cake Has a Story (2021).

== Recognition ==
Trade magazine QSR in 2019 named Milk Bar to its list of most innovative fast-casual start-ups.
