= Mr. West Cafe Bar =

Chain of coffee shops based in Seattle, Washington, U.S.

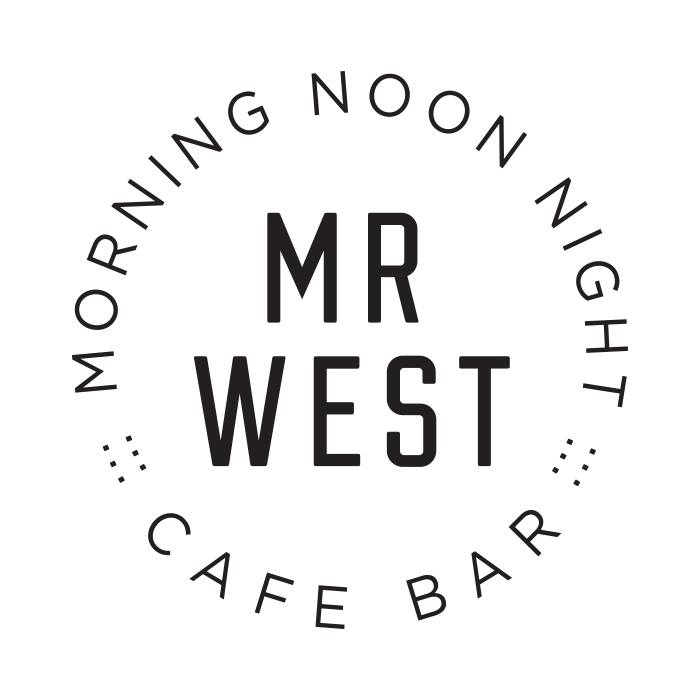

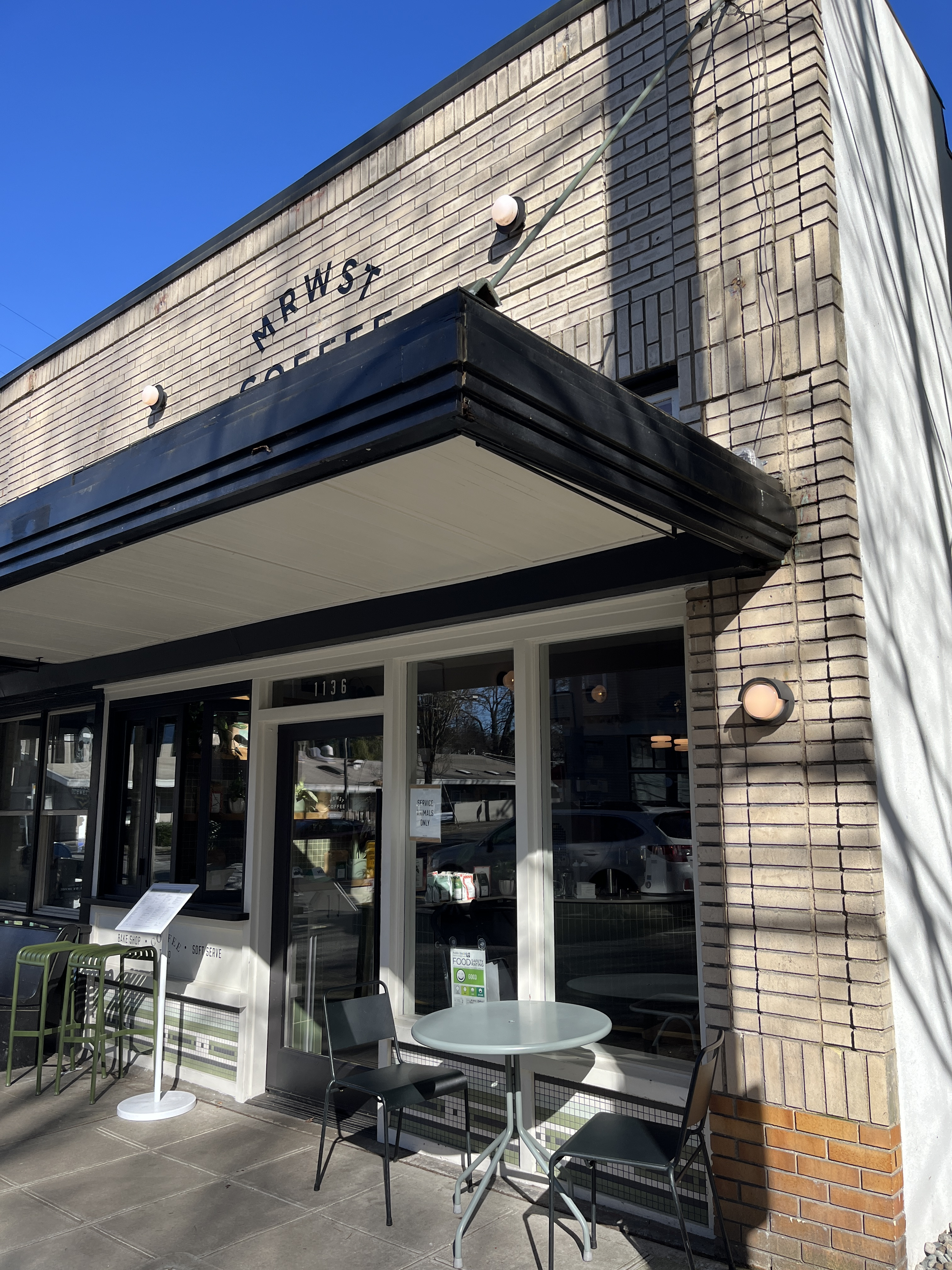
- Exterior of the coffee shop in Seattle's Madrona neighborhood, 2024

Restaurant information
- Food type: American
- Location: Seattle, Washington, United States
- Website: mrwestcafebar.com

Mr. West Cafe Bar is a small chain of coffee shops in Seattle, Washington. There are three locations, as of February 2023. The original cafe operates in the Denny Triangle area and an outpost opened in the University District's University Village in 2019.

== Description ==
Mr. West Cafe Bar is a small chain of coffee shops in Seattle. In addition to coffee and espresso drinks, cafes serve breakfast sandwiches (including a croissant egg variety), cheeses, fancy toasts, pastries, salads, sandwiches, beer, wine, and other cocktails, such as one matcha-based drink. Other speciality drinks include the cereal milk cappuccino, the coffee egg cream, coconut cream lattes, and cardamom tonics. The Mr. Breakfast has two boiled eggs, bacon, toast, avocado, and potatoes. The tuna melt has gouda cheese and Mama Lil's peppers, and the Mediterranean street fries have feta and chickpeas. Among seasonal salads is the harvest corn salad with roasted sweet corn and delicata squash.

According to Seattle Refined, the interior of the downtown Seattle location "exudes warm wood tones throughout, with features like the occasional plant and printed publication for sale in the entry way". Eater Seattle has described the interior as mid-century modern. The location at University Village, in the University District, is approximately the same size the original but has "higher ceilings and a bevy of indoor-outdoor spaces, like a hidden-away patio with an outdoor fireplace ... and cafe tables on the courtyard side, with much of the exterior shrouded in vines and greenery", according to Seattle Metropolitan. The outpost's interior has many plants. Mr. West hosts happy hour.

== History ==
Soni Davé-Schock and Henri Shock own the business. The original Mr. West opened in downtown Seattle's Eighth and Olive Building. In early 2019, the business announced plans to expand to University Village. Originally slated to open on July 4, the outpost began operating later in the month, in the space previously occupied by Mrs. Cook's. The outpost has two La Marzocco KB90s. There are three locations, as of February 2023.

== Reception ==
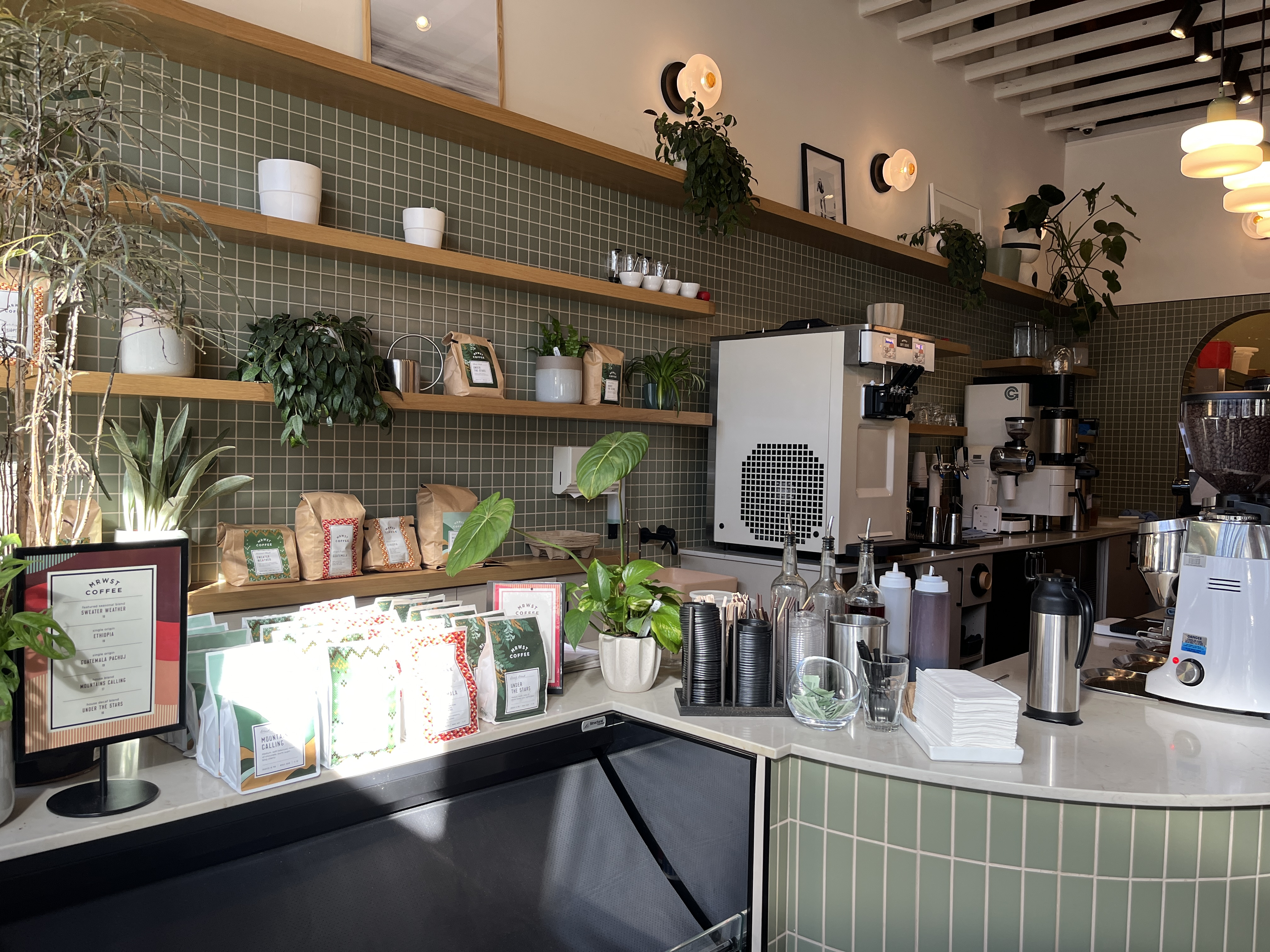
The Madrona shop's interior, 2024

Aimee Rizzo included Mr. West in The Infatuation's 2018 overview of "where to get brunch if you hate brunch". In 2023, she included the business in a list of Seattle's best cafes for working and an overview of the city's best happy hours. In Seattle Metropolitan's 2021 overview of a dozen "destination" coffee shops, Allecia Vermillion said the cafes "have a particular knack for specialty coffee drinks that appeal to coffee snobs and sweet enthusiasts alike". Eater Seattle's Megan Hill included Mr. West in a list of the city's best coffee shops for snacks. In Time Out's 2021 overview of Seattle's best coffee, Jen Woo wrote, "Come for an Instagram moment, stay for the drinks. With contemporary design, luxe finishings, artsy vignettes, and beautifully plated food, Mr. West Cafe Bar is the perfect place to snap a pic and find a delicious drink." In 2023, Charles Mudede included the Mr. Breakfast in The Stranger's overview of the city's best "bites" for $15 or less.

== See also ==
- List of coffeehouse chains
- List of restaurant chains in the United States
