= Milk Bar Pie =

Dessert

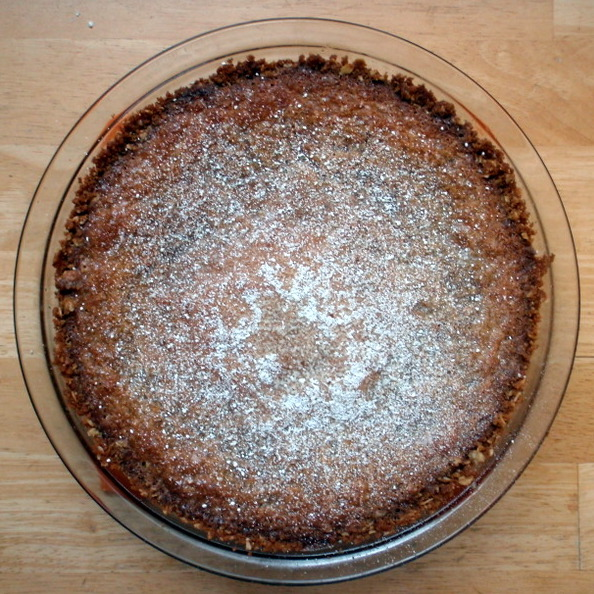
Milk Bar Pie

Milk Bar Pie is a pie created by the American chef Christina Tosi in 2008, made from sugar, butter, flour and oats. Tosi created the pie at the New York City restaurant wd~50, and it became the signature dish of her bakery, Milk Bar. Tosi originally named it Crack Pie for its addictive qualities, but changed it in 2019 after the name was criticized as insensitive.

== Development ==
The American chef Christina Tosi created Milk Bar Pie, initially known as Crack Pie, for a staff meal while working at the New York City restaurant wd~50. She described regularly making desserts from "whatever mise-en-place was left over from the previous night's service". When missing ingredients one morning, she came across a recipe for chess pie in the 1931 book Joy of Cooking. Tosi described chess pie as something "the old gals of yesteryear made when there was nothing to really make pie out of". She substituted heavy cream for the called-for buttermilk to create a gooier consistency and corn powder and milk powder for the called-for flour to create a more interesting flavor. It was popular at family meals. The final pie comprises sugar, butter, flour, and oats.

== Milk Bar ==
When Tosi opened Momofuku Milk Bar in 2008, she revised the Crack Pie to include an oatmeal-cookie crust. It became her signature product. According to Vice, Momofuku Milk Bar became "synonymous" with the Crack Pie, and Gourmet called it Tosi's "defining dessert". Bon Appetit called it her "most buzzed-about dish". In December 2009, the journalist Anderson Cooper discussed the pie on the talk show Live! with Regis and Kelly, which The New York Times called a "seminal moment".

The Los Angeles Times in 2010 said the price of the pie, then $44, was "jaw-dropping"; it attributed the pie's having "taken New York City by storm" partially to the price. Axios in 2022 called the dish a "cult favorite". Tosi's first cookbook, Momofuku Milk Bar (2011), contains a recipe for the pie.

== Name ==
Some food writers criticized naming foods including Crack Pie after addictive substances as insensitive and offensive. In May 2019, Devra First of the Boston Globe criticized the name in a column for making light of addiction by alluding to the addictiveness of crack cocaine. The following month, Milk Bar changed the name to Milk Bar pie.
