= Maya-Camille Broussard =

American chef

Maya-Camille Broussard is an American chef, author, and restaurant owner. She is the owner of Justice of the Pies in Chicago, Illinois, and was a 2022 finalist for the James Beard Foundation Award for Outstanding Baker. Broussard is a featured pastry chef on the Netflix series, Bake Squad.

== Early life ==
Broussard grew up in the Hyde Park neighborhood of Chicago. Her father, Stephen, and her aunt, Patricia Broussard, grew up poor in the housing projects on the West Side of Chicago, and experienced food scarcity, in part due to the expense of their father's alcoholism. Though Broussard's mother and father attempted to give Broussard a more stable upbringing, she inherited a generationally scarce and toxic relationship with food. Her hunger and health worsened after her parents divorced and Broussard chose to live with her father. This adversity inspires Broussard's baking and her community work.

Broussard is hard of hearing. She lost 75% of her hearing in a childhood accident. Broussard learned English primarily through reading and attended speech therapy for many years. Broussard relies on lip reading to communicate.

Broussard graduated from Howard University in Washington, D.C., with a Bachelor of Fine Arts degree. She ran Congo Square Theatre's educational outreach program from 2003 to 2008, teaching workshops in lower-income schools.

In 2004, Broussard graduated from Northwestern University, her father's alma mater, with her Master of Arts degree in theater. A few years later, Broussard's father was diagnosed with a brain tumor. He died in February 2009—just days before the opening of Broussard's first business, Three Peas Art Lounge. On Christmas Day in 2011, Three Peas was destroyed by a flood.

== Justice of the Pies ==
Broussard is a self-taught pastry chef.

In 2014, Broussard founded Justice of the Pies in honor of her late father, Stephen J. Broussard, a criminal-defense lawyer who was passionate about baking pies. Broussard operates Justice of the Pies out of the Hatchery, a food-and-beverage incubator with over 50 private professional kitchens, of which the highest-profile occupant is celebrity chef Rick Bayless. Justice of the Pies has sold pies to local grocery stores and farmers' markets. It also operates as a catering service.

=== Book ===
In October 2022, Broussard released her book, Justice of the Pies: Sweet and Savory Pies, Quiches, and Tarts plus Inspirational Stories from Exceptional People. About the book Publishers Weekly stated, “This deliciously loaded collection is a baker’s dream.”

== Community work ==
=== Mentoring ===
Since 2017, Justice of the Pies has been hosting an I Knead Love workshop several times a year. The course teaches children and teenagers from lower-income communities basic cooking skills, essential nutritional info, and how to cultivate creativity and joy in the kitchen.

=== Legal aid ===
Justice of the Pies hosts a yearly "Pie Drive" to support Cabrini Green Legal Aid (CGLA). CGLA serves the legal needs that arise from lack of opportunity, criminalization of poverty, and racial inequity experienced within Chicago's Cabrini Green community. Broussard's dad often advocated for second chances and equality. While a student at Northwestern University in 1968, Broussard's father and several Black students stormed the bursar's office on May 3, 1968, to protest the inequities Black students experienced at Northwestern. The 38-hour sit-in played a pivotal role in the creation of the Black House and the establishment of the African American Studies program.

=== Black Women’s Blueprint ===
Since 2020, Justice Of The Pies has been partnering with Baileys by infusing their desserts with liqueur flavors. The brand donated $25,000 to Black Women's Blueprint on behalf of Justice of the Pies during the holidays in 2020.

=== The Love Fridge ===
Broussard regularly gives food to The Love Fridge, a community hub that provides food for low-income neighborhoods that are located in food deserts.

=== COVID-19 pandemic response ===
Broussard experienced a decrease in demand for Justice of the Pies' treats and services as a result of COVID-19. At the beginning of the pandemic, as hospitals were overwhelmed with patients suffering from COVID-19, Justice of the Pies provided food to frontline workers at John H. Stroger Hospital, Roseland Hospital, Advocate Trinity Hospital, and Provident Hospital. Broussard chose to serve Stroger Hospital because it is the largest hospital in Chicago that sees the most patients who do not have insurance and because it services a lot of patients who have endured trauma. The food was paid for by actress, Kerry Washington.

=== George Floyd protests response ===
In June 2020, during the George Floyd protests, Chef Mario Santiago and Justice of the Pies provided chicken and biscuit pot pies to African American and Latino residents, to promote healing and unity, as well as fight food insecurity. Justice of the Pies also provided meals to minority business owners who experienced property damage in South Side neighborhoods due to unrest over George Floyd's murder.

=== Cannabis justice ===
In 2022, Broussard created her Peaches + Herb Cobbler, infused with a low dose of cannabis butter, to honor the work of Black women dispensary owners, Kika Keith and Kika Jr. from Gorilla Rx Wellness.

== Awards and honors ==
In November 2018, Chicago Magazine, named Justice of the Pies' bleu cheese praline pear as one of their Five Very Adventurous Pies to Try This Thanksgiving. In November 2020, The New Yorker named Justice of the Pies' bourbon pecan pie in their list of The Best Classic Pies to Order Online. In 2021, Broussard was featured on Today with Al Roker, teaching him and viewers how to make sweet potato plantain pie.

In November 2018, Broussard was featured in Food & Wine's list of Bakers Who Are Changing Their Communities for the Better.

In September 2021, Justice of the Pies was featured at Chicago Gourmet.

In 2022, Broussard was a finalist for the James Beard Foundation Award for Outstanding Baker.

In February 2023, Broussard was inducted into the Department of State's American Culinary Corps.

== Netflix's Bake Squad ==
Broussard has participated in sixteen Bake Squad episodes and won three challenges.

Every cast and crew member wears clear masks while interacting with Broussard on the show to provide her with communication accessibility. During the challenges, Broussard is aided by her enhanced sense of taste, smell, and sight, which she has gained as an adaptation to hearing loss.
