= Bake Squad =

American reality baking competition show

- Genre: Food Reality television
- Presented by: Christina Tosi
- Starring: Maya-Camille Broussard; Ashley Holt; Gonzo Jimenez; Christophe Rull
- Country of origin: United States
- Original language: English
- No. of seasons: 2
- No. of episodes: 16

Production
- Executive producer: Yasmin Shackleton
- Running time: 35 minutes

Original release
- Network: Netflix
- Release: August 11, 2021 – January 20, 2023

Bake Squad is an American reality baking competition television series which premiered on August 11, 2021, for a first season of eight episodes and a second season published on January 20, 2023, with eight episodes. It is presented by Christina Tosi, and features a returning group of four bakers who compete to make desserts for a different client each episode.

== Format ==
The series is only lightly competitive, with no prizes or elimination-style elements. Instead, the focus is on creating elaborate desserts for a per-episode client—usually for a celebration, wedding, or birthday. The bakers typically have seven hours to produce their desserts before presenting them.

Bakers periodically request help from Tosi for equipment or decorative pieces, such as chocolate molds or a claw machine, to showcase enhance their creation. After the client chooses a dessert, Tosi takes a picture of the client(s) and the winning baker with an instant camera, which is placed on a bulletin board signifying the win. The episode finishes with scenes from the client's celebration.

== Episodes ==
Bold indicates the baker(s) who produced the winning creation per-episode.

=== Season 1 (2021) ===
No.	Title	Original release date
1	"Brother Birthday Bash"	August 11, 2021
Challenge: Kids birthday for a mother of two boys.: Ashley: Three layer "pizza", "mac 'n cheese", and "spaghetti and meatball" cake.; Christophe: Giant ice cream cones filled with cake, fruit compote, and Italian meringue.; Maya-Camille: Sugar cookie house with marshmallow grass and edible miniatures.; Gonzo: Giant chocolate reptile egg with strawberry and milk chocolate miniature eggs.
2	"Rock n' Roll Wedding"	August 11, 2021
Challenge: Create a dessert for the wedding of the client's sister, using music, cats, and the outdoors as inspiration.: Ashley: Sculpted cat cake; vanilla cake with cookies & cream, and chocolate chip cookie dough filling.; Christophe: Life-sized chocolate drum-set with cheesecake, chocolate cake, and peanut candy bars.; Maya-Camille: Four-tiered bread pudding cake consisting of lemon lavender crème brûlée, cinnamon pretzel, chocolate muffin, and apple pie bread puddings.; Gonzo: Four-tiered chocolate wedding cake with caramelized hazelnuts and edible flowers.
3	"Sweet & Spicy Fiesta"	August 11, 2021
Challenge: Create a dessert for a Mexican-inspired 60th birthday party for the client's father.: Ashley: Sculpted hot sauce bottle piñata cake, filled with coconut cake and passionfruit buttercream, served with a mango cake sauce.; Christophe: Chocolate bonbon tree with mango, passion fruit, lime, and Carolina Reaper ganaches.; Maya-Camille: A cake in the shape of a six and a zero, made from coconut mango cheesecake, and churro-flavored flan.; Gonzo: A sweet taco cart with florentine cookie tacos, mango and cinnamon ice cream, sweet salsas, and chapulines.
4	"Kicking Cancer Celebration"	August 11, 2021
Challenge: The client's daughter is having a family gathering to celebrate her recovery from cancer. Design inspirations include Cosmetology, nostalgic candy, cake pops, and pickles.: Ashley: Candy claw machine containing violet, rum vanilla, and watermelon apple lollipops, gummy bears, and soft pretzels.; Christophe: Two-hundred and sixty item edible beauty counter, consisting of mousse lipsticks, fruit coulis nail varnish, and marshmallow eyeshadows.; Maya-Camille: Cake pop bouquet consisting of mango coconut macaroon, pineapple rum, dark chocolate ale, and platanos maduros & pretzel cake pops.; Gonzo: Life-sized chocolate bust with a chocolate crown, sugar candies, and bonbons.
5	"A Magical Wedding"	August 11, 2021
Challenge: Bakers work in teams of two. The client is seeking a dessert for a "royal winter wonderland" themed wedding.: Ashley & Gonzo: Sculpted castle cake; vanilla cake with mixed berry compote and marble cake with chocolate ganache. Forty-pound carved chocolate base.; Christophe & Maya-Camille: Throne room scene consisting of orange soda cakes with cranberry filling shaped as crown pillows, orange custard tarts, and decorative sugar showpiece.
6	"Supersize Smash Cake"	August 11, 2021
Challenge: Birthday party for the first birthday of a rainbow baby. Inspirations include tropical fruit, rainbows, chocolate and cereal.: Ashley: Edible life-sized ball pit with rice cereal walls, chocolate balls filled with mango and chocolate mouses, and a slide.; Christophe: Cupcake rainbow arrangement with raspberry, orange, lemon, mint chocolate, and blueberry flavored cupcakes. Pot of gold "smash cake" filled with yogurt mousse and diced pineapple.; Maya-Camille: Deep dish "smash pie" consisting of rainbow key lime pie blocks which spell out the client's name.; Gonzo: Four feet tall chocolate sculpted unicorn with "smash cake" hooves, filled with chocolate ganache and vanilla wafers.
7	"Super Sweet 16"	August 11, 2021
Challenge: Sweet sixteen birthday party for the clients' sister. Inspirations include the beach, Bohemian vintage, and thrifting.: Ashley: Thirty-layer red velvet cake with cream cheese frosting, shaped as a VW Bus. Served with edible spray paint.; Christophe: Dessert pizzas – "meat lovers" pizza with streusel "pepperoni", Bavarian vanilla cream, as well as a "vegetarian" pizza with marshmallow fluff and meringue.; Maya-Camille: Red velvet croissants, tie-dye macarons, and ombré red velvet crepe cake.; Gonzo: Jello bundt-shaped flavored with apple, pear, fruit punch, and pineapple extracts. Used an injection technique to form flowers within the geletin.
8	"For the Love of Cake"	August 11, 2021
Challenge: Client's parents' 34th wedding anniversary. Themes include travel, country chic, and Texas.: Ashley: Vintage wedding cake, in the style of the client's parents' original wedding cake. Strawberry-vanilla cake with banana cream, candied pecans, and berry compote.; Christophe: "Barbecue ribs" strawberry crème fraîche cake filled with crème brûlée, bananas foster ice cream "corn on the cob", and shaped sugar flames.; Maya-Camille: "Texan sized" deep-dish pie assortment: German Chocolate pecan pie, purple sweet potato pie, peach cobbler pie, and apple and banana pudding pie.; Gonzo: "Scientific S'mores". Pine-infused chocolate, banana flavored bourbon shots, and two types of s'mores: on skewers, and Texas-shaped sandwiches.

=== Season 2 (2023) ===
No.	Title	Original release date
1	"Bake Squad Bar Mitzvah"	January 20, 2023
Challenge: Bar mitzvah for a 13 year old boy's black-and-white party. Halfway through, the bakers were instructed to add a 'wow factor' to their design.: Ashley: Seven tier black and white chocolate and vanilla cake with inner cannon to shoot sprinkles and edible glitter out of the top.; Christophe: Edible chocolate balloon centerpieces filled with marshmallows that pour out when the balloon is cracked with a sugar tube leading to a base covered in s'more spheres.; Maya-Camille: Refueling station for race cars with a funfetti tire cake, black and white cookies, edible hard candy wrenches, churros, cupcakes, and doughnuts., as well as a fuel barrel filled with chocolate milk.; Gonzo: Giant chocolate rocket blasting off with edible chocolate mousse cake clouds and chocolate sphere base that smokes when a button is pressed.
2	"Surprise Baby Announcement"	January 20, 2023
Challenge: Create a surprise factor baby reveal dessert for the surprise baby announcement of a married couple.: Ashley: Floating three tier spice cardamom cake with design that has 'baby' inscribed within the layers of the topmost cake. However, the words did not show at the reveal.; Christophe: Life-sized chocolate crib with vanilla cake with fresh raspberry mattress, edible stars and moon blanket, chocolate and toasted almond stuffed animal cakes, and a rice crispy pillow. The crib will be hidden behind a 'photo wall' prior to the reveal.; Maya-Camille: Passionfruit and rose turkish delights, cardamom and pistachio milk puddings, and pecan baklava arranged in Islamic geometric designs with sonogram design hidden under desserts.; Gonzo: Giant chocolate gift box that opens to reveal a chocolate baby and other confections when the lid is removed.
3	"Vow Renewal"	January 20, 2023
Challenge: Create a dessert for a 10-year vow renewal party to surprise the husband.: Ashley: Three-foot globe-shaped vanilla cake with a peanut butter filling and crumble with two-foot chocolate sculptures of the husband and wife sitting atop it.; Christophe: Three-foot volcano vanilla espresso-soaked cake with caramelized peanuts and peanut butter and a tornado made of sugar and cotton candy. Tiny volcanos and tornadoes were also made for guests to take made of chocolate cake and mousse.; Maya-Camille: Variety of cupcakes in cinnamon and blood orange, cannoli, honey thyme and raspberry, and guava flavors displayed in a succulent garden pattern featuring the couple's initials.; Gonzo: Giant heart-shaped box of chocolates with thirteen mousse cakes functioning as the chocolates in a variety of flavors mirroring the typical different chocolates in a mixed box.
4	"80s Volunteer Appreciation Party"	January 20, 2023
Challenge: Make an 80s-themed dessert to celebrate the 10 year anniversary of the Black Everywhere charity and a very special volunteer named Mignon. The bakers were given a cart of 80s items by Christina for inspiration.: Ashley: Edible 80s-themed pants made with German chocolate cake and prom dress made with tie dye cake and a pop rock bark that people can stand behind to appear to be wearing in front of a photo booth.; Christophe: Initially was creating stacked sugar panels to resemble a giant rubix cube as well as mini-cubes flavored with Nerds candy and chocolate cake, gummy coke and caramel mousse with vanilla cake, and mascarpone banana Runtz mousse with passion-mango curd with vanilla cake. After several sugar panels broke, the idea was switched to one large sugar cube holding the smaller cake cubes.; Maya-Camille: Five edible African-inspired accessories reminiscent of black 80s hip-hop: kufi hat with kente cloth design made of vanilla cake with peach cobbler filling, bamboo earrings made of chocolate, African medallion sugar cookie necklace, Mignon-named ring made of chocolate with caramel-pecan filling, and a sweet potato pie fanny pack.; Gonzo: Giant boombox made of chocolate with cassette chocolate bars flavored with pineapple upside-down cake, strawberry shortcake, and black forest cake.
5	"Double 75th Birthday"	January 20, 2023
Challenge: A surprise double birthday party for a tango-loving Argentinian married couple orchestrated by their sons.: Ashley: Functioning photo album with modeling chocolate pages made of Argentinian rum-soaked vanilla cake with dulce de leche frosting and edible pictures of the family within.; Christophe: Giant croquembouche made with over 1,000 black and red colored cream puffs with varying cream fillings of banana, dulce de leche, chocolate, strawberry, and lemon mascarpone cheese.; Maya-Camille: Lemon-ricotta and chocolate mascarpone tarts, mate tiramisu cake, cake push pops, crème brulee mille-feuille, and chocolate cake with espresso buttercream presented as a family tree of desserts, as well as a recreation of the receiver's classic cake with vanilla cake, peach jam, dulce de leche, and meringue strips.; Gonzo: Life-sized piano made of over 300lbs of chocolate filled with classic Argentinian desserts like torta chocolina, chocolate mate tea cup replicas, and alfajors.
6	"Varsity Gay League"	January 20, 2023
Challenge: A party to celebrate the largest LGBTQ recreational sports organization in the country's founder, Will and the 15th anniversary of the Varsity Gay League. With a guest list of over 200 people, it is the biggest party the Bake Squad has been tasked with so far, so it was announced this would be a team challenge.: Ashley & Maya-Camille: A rainbow float with multi-colored spheres made with pumpkin cake pops, mint blondies, rice treats, whoopie pies, coconut macaroons, and lollipops. The different levels of the float have rainbow swirl fudge, cinnamon rolls, and jello shots and is topped with a watermelon margarita foam finger cake.; Christophe & Gonzo: Trophy case decorated with colorful macarons and filled with chocolate trophies, photos, and edible sports items such as chocolate baseball bats, mitts, and balls, sugar tennis racquets, chocolate footballs filled with rainbow bailey's truffles once cracked open, and an edible beer pong setup with a beer pong table made of vanilla cake, pineapple filling, and coconut mousse.
7	"Multicultural Wedding"	January 20, 2023
Challenge: Create a dessert for the wedding day of a couple from two distinct cultures.: Ashley: Decorated chocolate fountain with cinnamon and ginger sugar cookie tiles inspired by the groom's Mexican heritage. The fountain will be adorned with jam thumbprint, benne seed, and Mexican wedding cookies.; Christophe: Breakfast buffet items that appear to look like savory breakfast foods, as well as traditional breakfast desserts such as donuts and conchas in vanilla, strawberry, and lemon flavors. The buffet also includes strawberry shortcake disguised as a loaf of bread, a chocolate and raspberry illusory 'breakfast burrito' wrapped in crepe, and puff pastry topped in coconut mousse and mango puree disguised as eggs benedict with a guava topping to mimic salmon.; Maya-Camille: Nine-tiered cheesecake tower with cheesecake flavors of goat cheese and cherry, mango con chili, monkey bread, and avocado lime, with a cream cheese pound cake topper.; Gonzo: Multi-tier square chandelier-shaped wedding cake decorated with chocolate spheres and drizzles and two differently flavored cakes: mimosa with orange and champagne buttercream, and a horchata cake.
8	"Bring on the Heat!"	January 20, 2023
Challenge: Create a dessert celebrating firefighting Captain Thomas "Kit" Kitahata being named Firefighter of the Year that encompasses his love for tartness, fruitiness, and spice.: Ashley: Life-sized illusory fire hydrant made from chocolate filled with fruit and a life-sized Dalmatian dog-shaped green tea cake with blackberry jam and cream cheese frosting.; Christophe: Illusion vegetable garden with sugar-blown carrots filled with carrot cake, chocolate cabbage filled with apple pie, sculpted onions with coconut cream, pineapple, and mango compote, peanut chocolate sculpted mushroom with raspberry filling, marzipan potatoes, and mascarpone sculpted beets with a strawberry beet compote. The 'vegetables' are housed in chocolate soil and displayed like a tiered garden.; Maya-Camille: Sweet and savory spicy pies with odd flavor combinations such as wasabi and yuzu, fig and pancetta, strawberry and cayenne, miso and caramel with pear, and caramelized onion and broccoli pie. Large pies and small pies were made for each flavor and displayed in a miniature firehouse.; Gonzo: Fire fighter's locker made of chocolate with elements related to the job, with a ginger, raspberry, and chocolate roulade cake designed to look like a fire hose. The 4' tall locker includes boots, a fireaxe, a toolbox, and a helmet and is adorned with edible photos of Kit and his family.
