= Christopher Boffoli =

American photographer

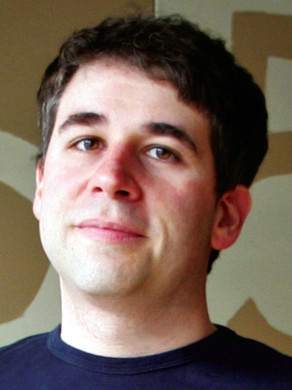
- Born: 1969 (age 56–57); Worcester, Massachusetts
- Occupation: fine art photographer
- Known for: "Big Appetites" – miniatures on food

Christopher Boffoli (born in 1969 in Worcester, Massachusetts) is a fine art photographer, photojournalist, independent filmmaker, and journalist based in Seattle. He is best known for his "Big Appetites" photographs series, in which tiny, detailed human figures pose in real food environments. His photos have been published in dozens of countries around the world, and are displayed in galleries and private collections in the United States, Canada, Europe, and Asia.

== Career ==
While in college, Boffoli started his own commercial photography company in Charleston, South Carolina, and later worked for 12 years as a philanthropic fundraiser for universities such as Dartmouth College and the London School of Economics. After recovering from a fall during a climbing expedition of Mount Rainier in which he suffered a broken leg and nerve and tendon damage, he decided that a career in academia was not as fulfilling as "doing creative things" and focused his energy on the arts.

Inspired by childhood films and television shows – especially those showing tiny people in a normal-sized world – and by a 2002 London Chapman Brothers exhibit featuring dioramas of war scenes and Martin & Muñoz's work "Travelers", he began a photography series of tiny people in a food world. Boffoli purchases the miniature figures from Europe, and occasionally re-paints or cuts them physically or alters them digitally. He originally called these photos the "Disparity" series, later changing the name to "Big Appetites".

According to Boffoli, "You can't just stick a figure on a cupcake and call it a picture; you've got to think of the context of what a character is doing. For me, the caption is a way to reinforce the humor and the action in the photograph. People connect with the image first, but the caption gives it a snarky bump." He also notes that the "context between character and the food is important to making the picture work."

By 2011, Boffoli's photographs were featured in a variety of international media, including Oprah.com, the Toronto Star, and the Huffington Post. In 2012, his photographs were featured in many more publications worldwide, including Business Insider, Der Spiegel, The Washington Post Lifestyle blog, the Village Voice blog, Bon Appétit's online blog, and MSNBC's First Look program. In 2012 Boffoli sued Twitter for copyright infringement and for ignoring Digital Millennium Copyright Act requests to take his photos down from Twitter servers. After a suit was filed in federal court, Twitter and Boffoli settled out of court.

Boffoli was a James Beard Award finalist in 2012 in the humor category, for images which accompanied an article about his work in The Kitchn. One of Boffoli's photos was the cover image of the Spring 2013 issue of Lucky Peach, the quarterly journal of food writing, and his photographs were featured on The New York Times "What We're Reading" segment of its Dining & Wine section in June 2013.

Boffoli is also an avid traveler and photojournalist. His travels are well documented in photographs and his work has been used by various news organizations. His first book of photographs, Big Appetites: Tiny People in a World of Big Food, was released in September 2013 by Workman Publishing.
