= Kabawa =

Restaurant in New York City

Restaurant information
- Established: March 25, 2025
- Head chef: Paul Carmichael
- Food type: Modern Caribbean
- Rating: New York Times: 3 Stars
- Location: 8 Extra Place, New York, New York, 10003, United States
- Seating capacity: 48
- Reservations: Accepted
- Website: www.momofuku.com/restaurants/kabawa

Kabawa is a restaurant located in the East Village, Manhattan, New York City, established in 2025 by Chef Paul Carmichael. The restaurant is associated with Momofuku, a restaurant group founded by David Chang. There is also the more casual sister bar, Bar Kabawa, next door, serving small plates, including fried and baked patties, and cocktails primarily made from rum, such as daiquiris, which opened earlier in the same year.

== Food ==
The food is designed to showcase the depth and diversity of Caribbean cuisine, and is a three course pre-fixe menu. The meal starts with an initial bread section consisting of roti and bammy served with an array of accompaniments for the table. The remaining courses are then selected from three sections, including "Pepper Shrimp," a mixture of raw royal red shrimp served with sorrel, scotch bonnet, and thyme, and goat served with spicy scallop creole. The menu also includes several large format options, including a signature Puerto Rican influenced Chuleta Can Can, served with recaíto, as well as a coconut turnover to share for dessert.

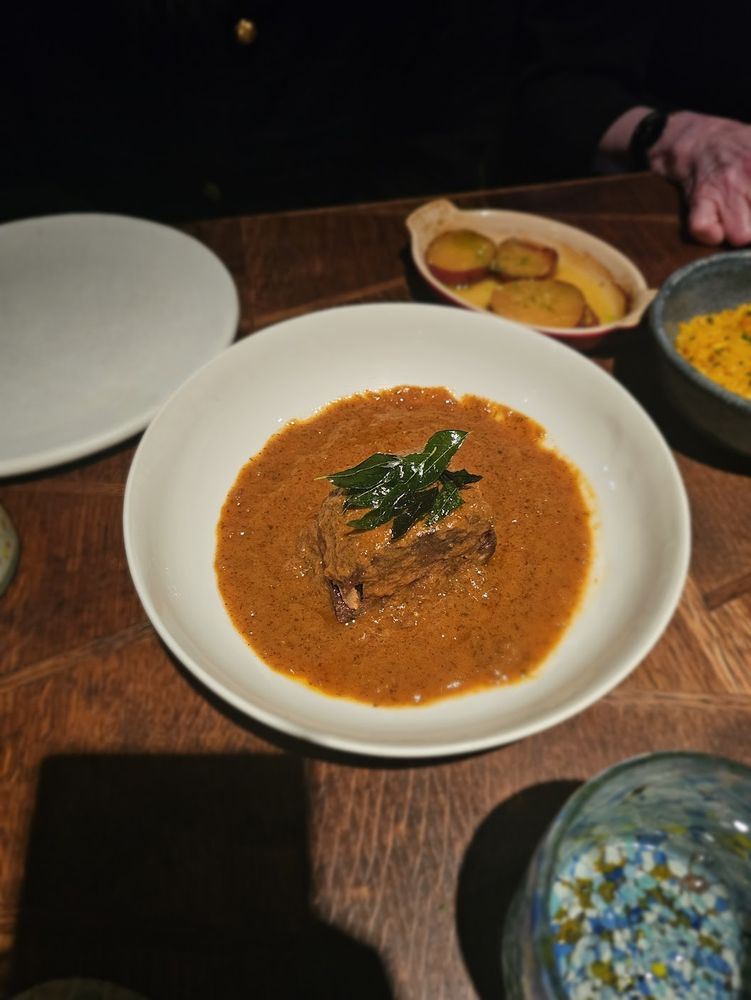
2nd Course Selection- Goat with spicy scallop creole.

== Accolades ==
- NYT 100 Best Restaurants in NYC 2026: #1
- NYT 100 Best Restaurants in NYC 2025: #4
- Food & Wine 2026 Global Tastemakers Awards: Best Restaurant in America
- Eater: "Best New Restaurant 2025"
- Esquire: Best New Restaurant 2025 along with "Chef of the Year"

== See also ==
- Barbadian cuisine
