= Cereal Milk =

Milk flavored with breakfast cereal

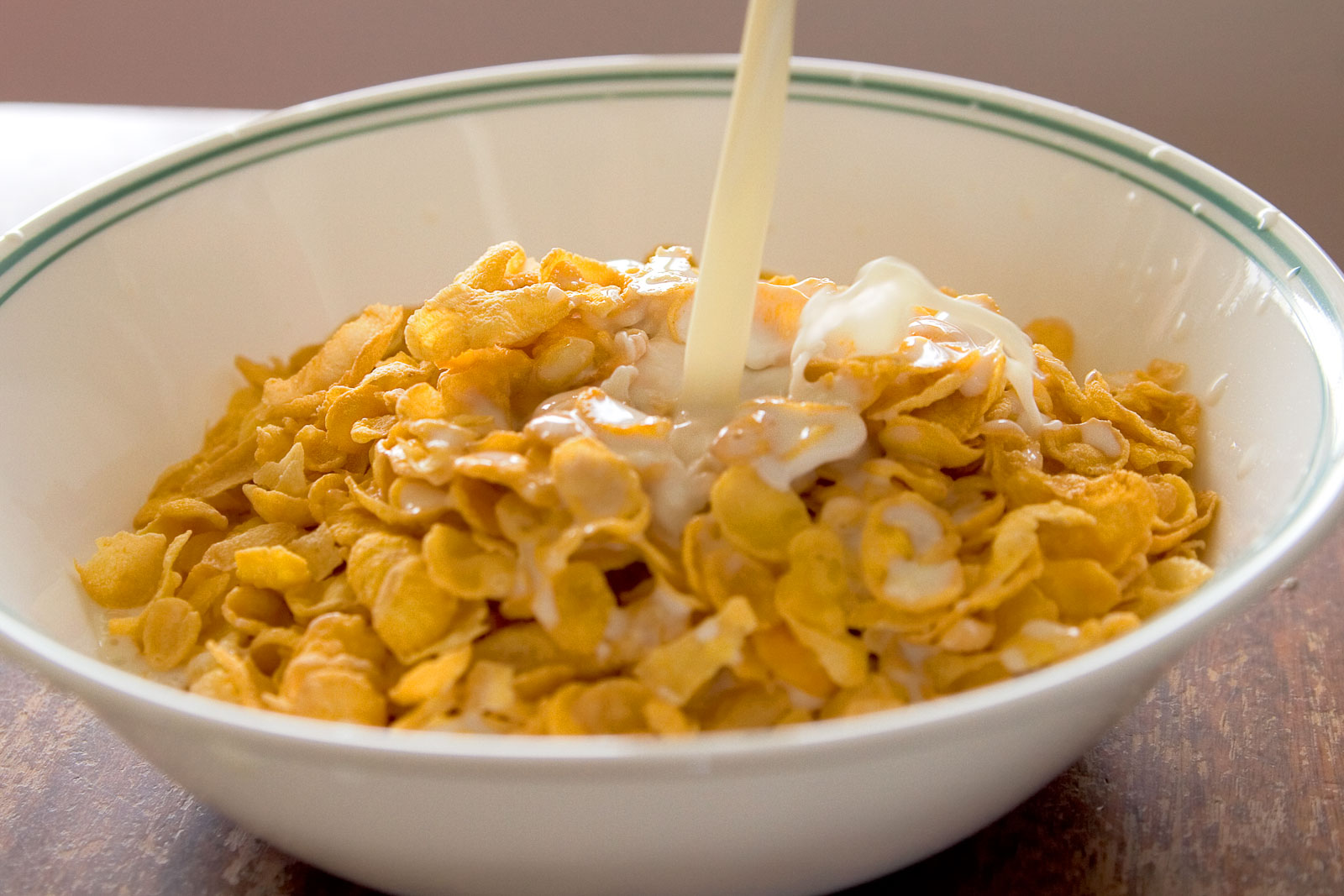
Cornflakes in milk

Cereal Milk is a flavor, beverage, and ingredient introduced commercially by Christina Tosi in 2006 while working at Momofuku. Cereal Milk is milk flavored with breakfast cereal.

Cereal milk has inspired various food creations, including cereal milk ice cream and cereal milk-flavored beverages.

== Development ==
Tosi first created Cereal Milk in 2006 as an ingredient while working for David Chang at Momofoku. There were no desserts on the menu when Tosi came on board, and she created her own recipes inspired by the flavors of her favorite foods from childhood, including Cereal Milk panna cotta. The Los Angeles Times described Tosi's version of panna cotta as "[taking] something upscale...and [yanking] it down." Tosi further developed the concept at Momofuku Bakery and Milk Bar, now Milk Bar. In addition to the panna cotta, Tosi has developed an ice cream, cookies, a charlotte, and beverages such as milk, lattes, and milkshakes. The basic ingredient is also used as a mixer for coffees and cocktails.

When Tosi opened Milk Bar, one of the first menu items was her Cereal Milk soft-serve ice cream. Tosi has since expanded to packaged custard-style ice cream in Cereal Milk flavors.

== Preparation and ingredients ==
The beverage and basic ingredient Cereal Milk is prepared by toasting cornflakes, steeping them at room temperature in milk, draining off the cereal, and adding brown sugar and salt. Other cereals can also be used.

Preparation
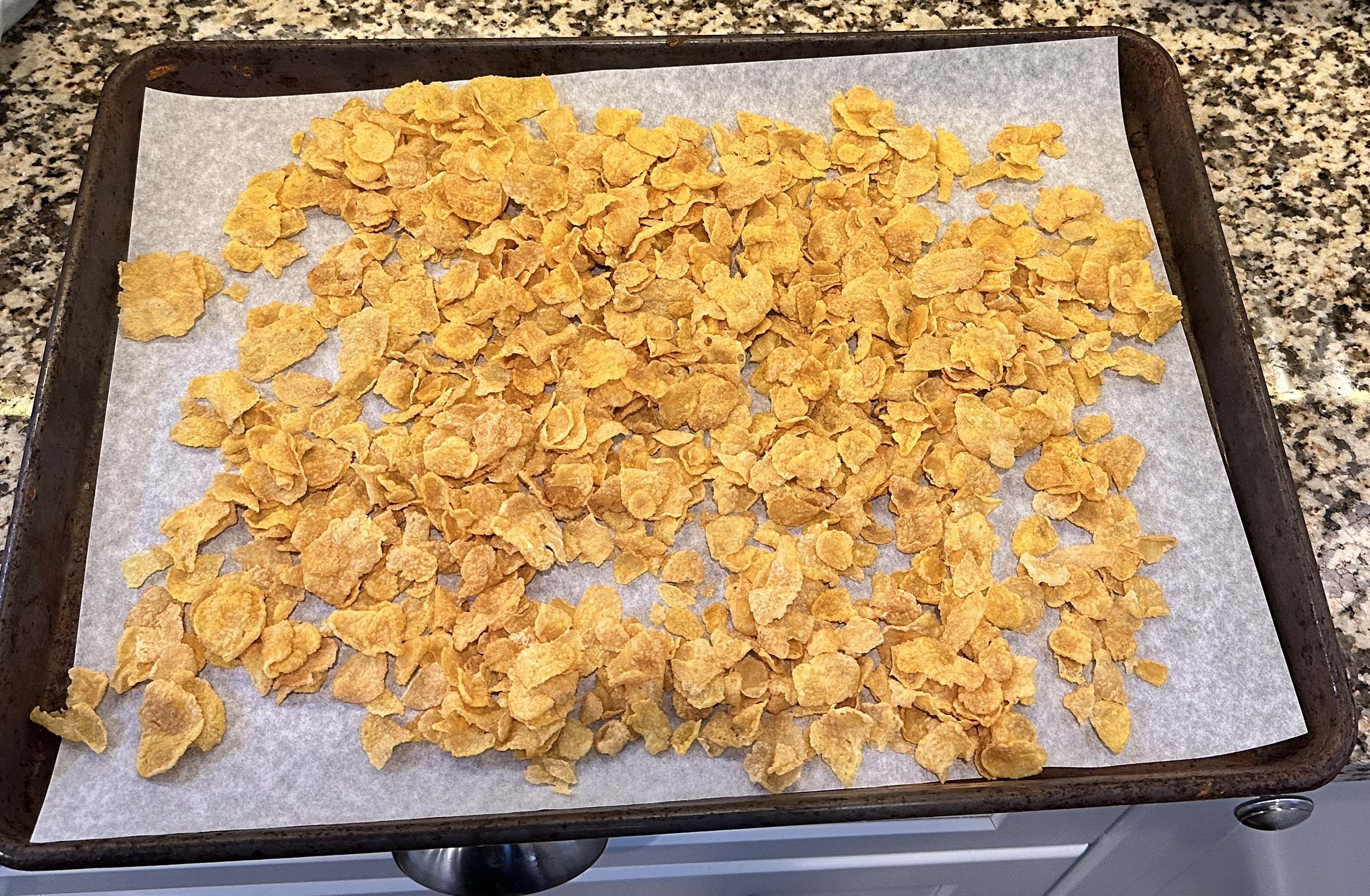
Toasted cornflakes

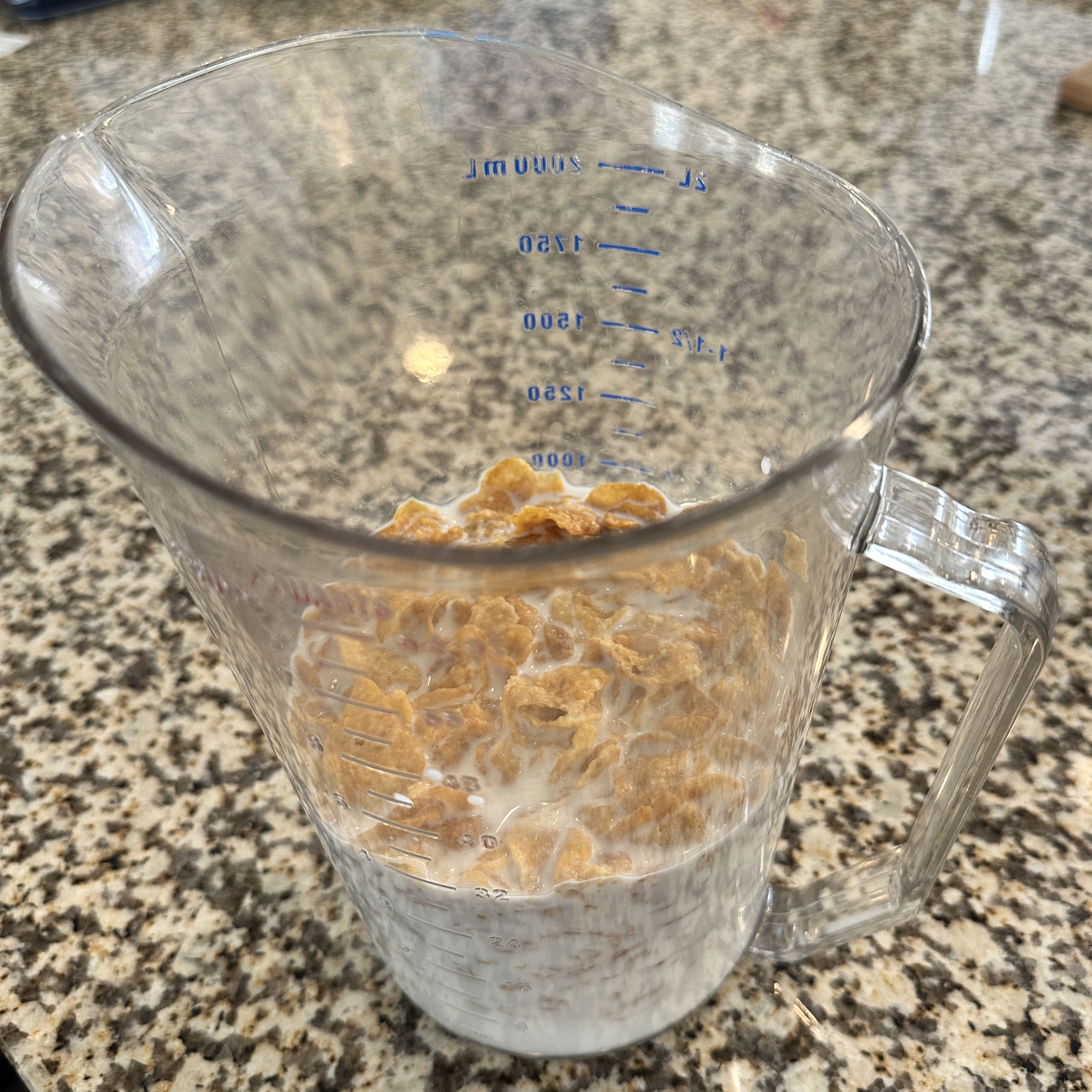
Steeping toasted cornflakes in milk

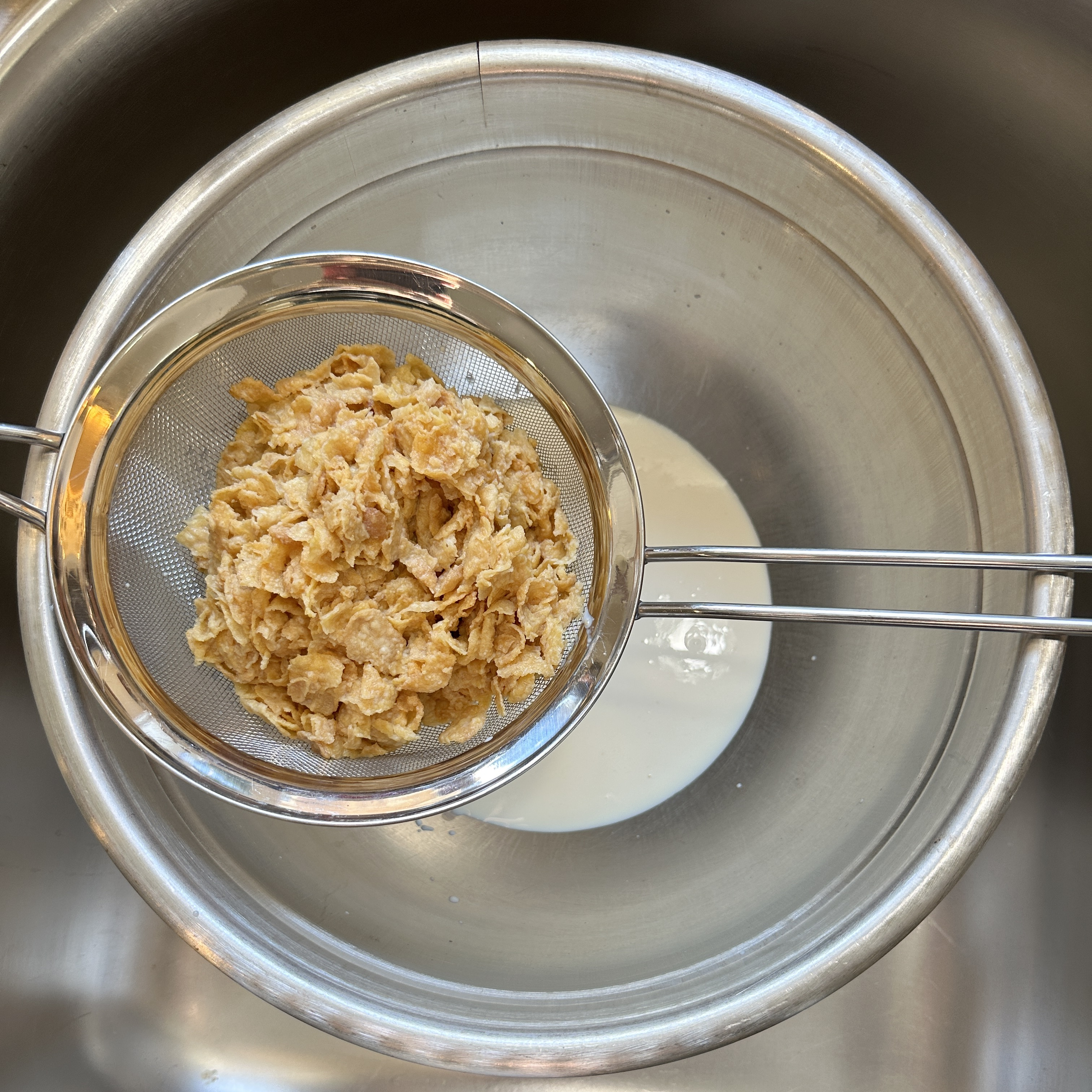
Draining steeped toasted cornflakes

== Reception ==
According to the New York Times, "Nothing bears the trademark of the pastry chef Christina Tosi more than her cereal milk flavor," and that she had made it a "household name". Axios called Cereal Milk a "cult favorite". Trade journal Restaurant Business called Tosi's cereal milk "iconic".

Saveur's Megan Zhang theorized that the appeal of the cereal milk flavor was rooted in the nostalgia of recalling that breakfast cereal was 'the first thing many of us learned to “cook” and eat ourselves as youngsters'.

== Influence ==
In 2017 Ben & Jerry's introduced a line of flavors that Eater called a [blatant ripoff] of Tosi's creation. Burger King produced a Cereal Milk milkshake.
