= Brush Script =

Typeface family

- Category: Casual script
- Designer: Robert E. Smith
- Foundry: American Type Founders
- Date created: 1942

Several pangrams written using Brush Script

Brush Script is a casual connecting script typeface designed in 1942 by Robert E. Smith for the American Type Founders (ATF). The face exhibits an expressive graphic stroke emulating the look of handwritten letters with an ink brush. Lowercase letters are deliberately irregular to further reinforce the look of handwritten text. The typeface was introduced in 1942 and saw near immediate success with advertisers, retailers, and in posters. Its popularity continued through the 1950s, and waned as influence of the International Typographic Style grew in the 1960s. The typeface has regained considerable popularity for its nostalgic association with the post WW2 era.

Along with Dom Casual and Mistral, it is one of the best-known casual script typefaces. Brush script reflects developments in script typography that are influenced by handwriting traditions and commercial printing practices.

== Reception ==
Brush Script was named #3 in "Least Favorite" nomination in 2007 designers' survey, conducted by Anthony Cahalan. "Least Favorite" is defined as "misused or overused", "ugly", "boring, dated, impractical or clichéd", "dislike or blind hatred".

Brush Script was rated #5 in "The 8 Worst Fonts In The World" list in Simon Garfield's 2010 book Just My Type.

Brush Script is used as the "Stage" text in the 1998 manga Initial D. It is used in the logo for its sequel, Second Stage. being reused for every stage after it as well.

== See also ==
- Mistral
- Dom Casual
