= Dom Casual =

- Category: Casual script
- Designer: Peter Dom
- Foundry: American Type Founders
- Date created: 1951
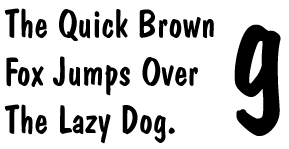
- Sample

Dom Casual is an American typeface designed in 1951 by Peter Dom (born as Peter Dombrezian). It is an informal design that emulates brush script.

Dom Casual is featured in the 1956 musical teen drama film Rock, Rock, Rock! In television shows, it also has been used often in titles and credits, such as on Bewitched, Barney Miller, Home Improvement (seasons 4–6), Beakman's World, The Super Mario Bros. Super Show, Animaniacs, Barney & Friends (from 1992 to 1999), Sesame Street (from 1992 to 2006), Grange Hill (from 1986 to 1989), and Only Fools And Horses, as well as 1960-64 Warner Bros. cartoons, and is currently used in various labels on The Price Is Right. Other TV shows which have used it include Bill Nye the Science Guy, the first season of Inspector Gadget, the Bob Saget era of America's Funniest Home Videos, Full House and Clarissa Explains it All.

In business and commerce, The Great Atlantic & Pacific Tea Company ("A&P") used it in their instore broadsheet signage and in newspaper advertising into the mid-1970s and Menards has also used it inside its stores. New Mexico-based restaurant Mac's Steak in the Rough has used the font on its outdoor signage and dining menus. The Oklahoma-based restaurant chain Hideaway Pizza also prominently uses the font in its logo, as well as its signage and menus, alongside comic sans.

It has also been used in a variety of games and sometimes, other software such as Marble Blast Gold and the package of Microsoft Bob.
