= Wylie Dufresne =

American chef

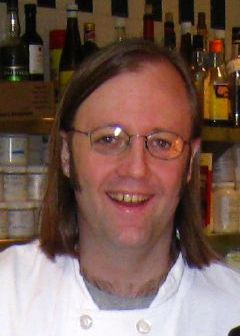
- Wylie Dufresne in 2007
- Born: June 3, 1970 (age 56); Providence, Rhode Island, U.S.
- Education: Colby College; French Culinary Institute
- Culinary career
- Cooking style: Molecular gastronomy
- Current restaurants
- Du's Donuts (closed); WD-50 (closed); Alder (closed); Stretch Pizza
- Awardss
- James Beard Foundation: * Rising Star Chef nominee 2000 * Best New Restaurant nominee 2004 * Best Chef in New York nominee 2007 * Best Chef in New York winner 2013

Wylie Dufresne is an American chef. He was previously the owner of Du's Donuts and the former chef and owner of the wd~50 and Alder restaurants in Manhattan. He now owns Stretch Pizza on 24th Street and Park in Manhattan. Dufresne is a leading American proponent of molecular gastronomy, the movement to incorporate science and new techniques in the preparation and presentation of food.

== Early life ==
Born in 1970 in Providence, Rhode Island, Dufresne is a graduate of Friends Seminary and The French Culinary Institute (now known as The International Culinary Center) in New York. In 1992, he completed a B.A. in philosophy at Colby College in Waterville, Maine.

== Career ==
From 1994 through 1999, he worked for Jean-Georges Vongerichten, where he was eventually named sous chef at Vongerichten's eponymous Jean Georges. In 1998 he was chef de cuisine at Vongerichten's Prime in The Bellagio, Las Vegas. In 1999, he left to become the first chef at 71 Clinton Fresh Food. In April 2003, he opened his 70-seat restaurant, wd~50 (named for the chef's initials and the street address, as well as a pun on WD-40) on Clinton Street on Manhattan's Lower East Side. In March 2013, he opened a second restaurant Alder in the East Village. wd-50 closed 30 November 2014 and Alder closed in August 2015.

Dufresne was a James Beard Foundation nominee for Rising Star Chef of the Year in 2000 and chosen the same year by New York Magazine for their New York Awards. Food & Wine magazine named him one of 2001 America's Ten Best Chefs award and, in 2006, New York Magazine's Adam Platt placed wd-50 fourth in his list of New York's 101 best restaurants. He was awarded a star in Michelin's New York City Guide, 2006, 2007, and 2008, the first Red Guide for North America, and was nominated for Best Chef New York by the James Beard Foundation. His signature preparations include Pickled Beef Tongue with Fried Mayonnaise and Carrot-Coconut Sunnyside-Up.

In 2006, Dufresne lost to Mario Batali on Iron Chef America. In 2007, he began making appearances as a judge on Bravo's Top Chef, which includes season 2, season 4, season 5, season 7 and season 12. He was invited to participate in Top Chef Masters in 2009, where he placed third out of four in the preliminary rounds. Dufresne also appeared in the final of the United Kingdom version of Masterchef, teaching the eventual winner. He appeared as himself in the 5th Episode of HBO's Treme alongside Tom Colicchio, Eric Ripert and David Chang.

In 2013, Dufresne won the James Beard Foundation's Best NYC Chef. It was his 10th nomination and first win. Dufresne’s wd50 restaurant in New York City closed in 2014.

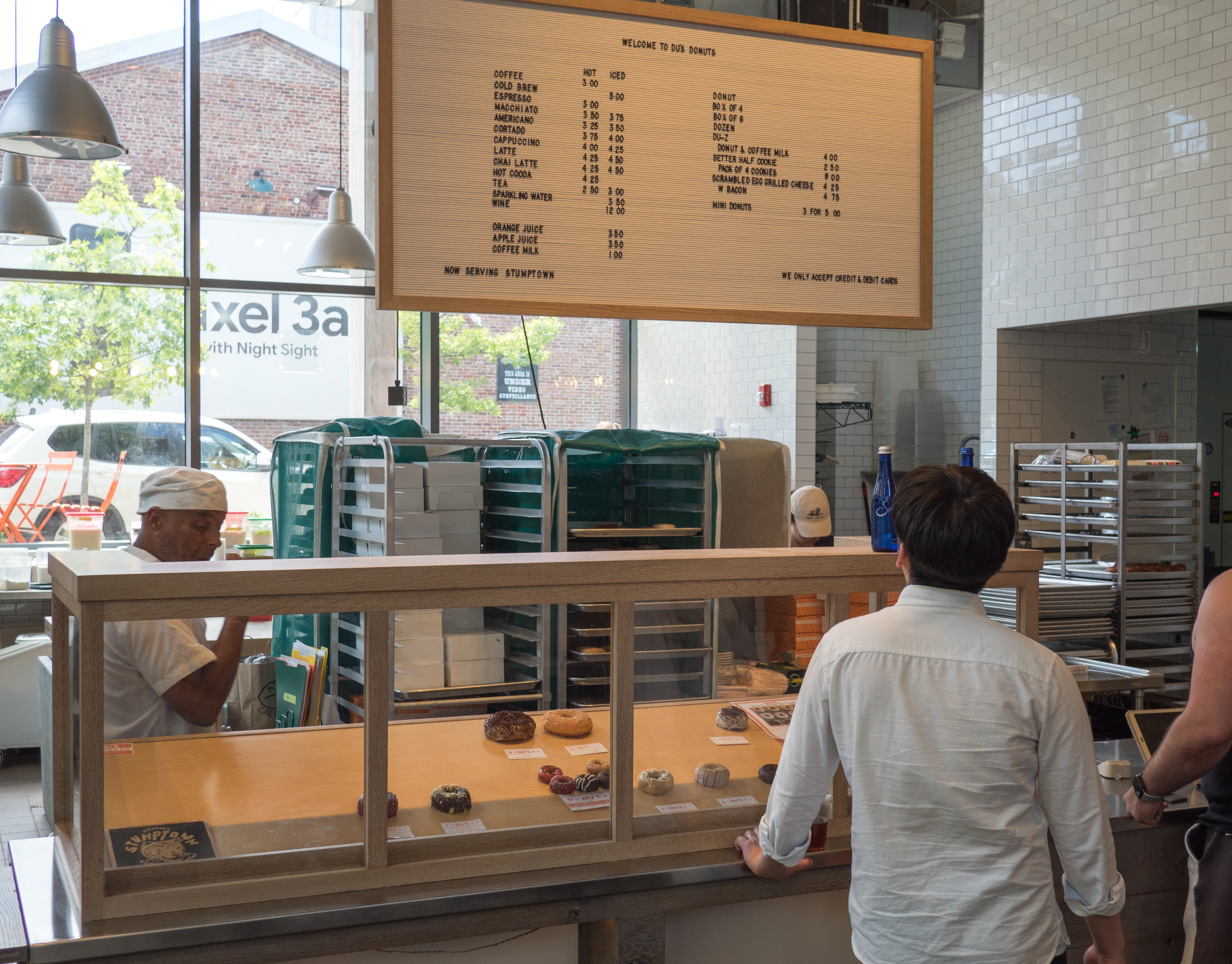
Du's Donuts counter

In April 2017, Dufresne, along with head baker Colin Kull and general manager Sharilyn Chavez, took over a pop-up space at the William Vale Hotel in Williamsburg as Du's Donuts & Coffee. The pop-up grew into a small chain that now has locations in Soho and Brooklyn. Dufresne's cookbook wd~50, was published in October 2017. Dufresne has a pizza place called Stretch on Park between 24th and 25th.
