= Wd~50 =

wd~50
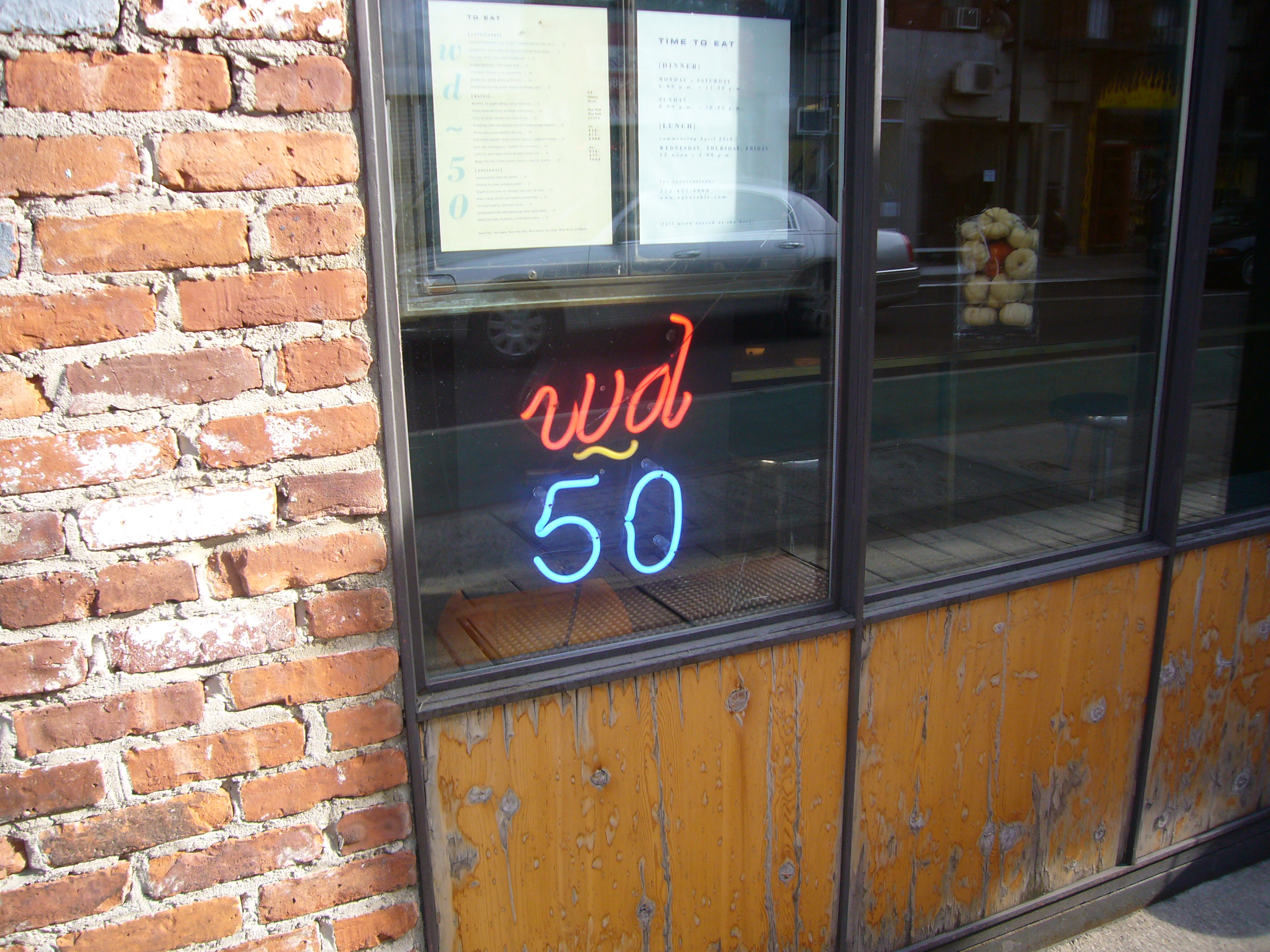
- The restaurant's exterior in 2008
- Interactive map of wd~50

Restaurant information
- Established: April 9, 2003
- Closed: November 30, 2014
- Owner: Wylie Dufresne
- Chef: Wylie Dufresne
- Food type: Molecular gastronomy; New American
- Rating: (Michelin Guide)
- Location: 50 Clinton Street (between Rivington Street and Stanton Street), on the Lower East Side in Manhattan, New York City, New York, 10002, United States
- Coordinates: 40°43′10.61″N 73°59′4.67″W

wd~50 was a molecular gastronomy New American/international restaurant in Manhattan, New York City. It was opened on April 9, 2003 by chef Wylie Dufresne. wd~50 closed November 30, 2014. The restaurant was located at 50 Clinton Street (between Rivington Street and Stanton Street), on the Lower East Side. The name was a play on its street address, chef's initials, and WD-40.

== Awards and ratings ==
It was listed among the S. Pellegrino World's 50 Best Restaurants for 2010. In 2006 the restaurant received a Michelin star in the New York City guide, which it retained until it closed.

In 2013, Zagat gave it a food rating of 25 out of 30.

== Closure ==
On June 10, 2014, The New York Times reported that wd~50 would be closing due to a real estate developer planning on constructing a new building at the site. The restaurant closed on November 30, 2014.

== See also ==
- List of New American restaurants
- List of restaurants in New York City
