= Under the Tonto Rim =

Under the Tonto Rim may refer to:

- Under the Tonto Rim (novel), a 1926 novel by Zane Grey, or its film adaptations:
  - Under the Tonto Rim (1928 film), starring Richard Arlen
  - Under the Tonto Rim (1933 film), a film directed by Henry Hathaway
  - Under the Tonto Rim (1947 film), a Western
