= Tango (disambiguation) =

Tango is a social dance form including Argentine, Uruguayan, and international ballroom tango.

Tango may also refer to:

== Arts, entertainment, and media ==
=== Dance ===
- Tango (Balanchine), a ballet by George Balanchine based on a Stravinsky composition
- Tango (Martins), a ballet by Peter Martins based on a Stravinsky composition
- Maxixe (dance), also known as "Brazilian tango"

=== Films ===
- ¡Tango! (1933 film), a film by Argentine director Luis Moglia Barth
- Tango (1933 film), a film by Danish director George Schnéevoigt
- Tango (1936 film), a film by Phil Rosen
- Tango (1969 film), a 1969 Bulgarian film
- Tango (1981 film), an animated film by Polish director Zbigniew Rybczyński
- Tango (1993 film), a film by French director Patrice Leconte
- Tango (1998 film), a film by Spanish director Carlos Saura

=== Music and dance ===
==== Genres and styles ====
- Tango music, a genre of music that originated in Argentina and Uruguay
- Tango (flamenco), a song-form or instrumental-form of flamenco music

==== Albums ====
- Tango (Julio Iglesias album), 1996
- Tango (Patty Larkin album), 1991
- Tango (Negative album), 2004
- Tango (Sonia & Disappear Fear album), 2007
- Tango (Tanguito album), recorded in 1970 and released posthumously in 1973

==== Compositions ====
- "Tango" (Stravinsky), a 1940 piece by Russian composer Igor Stravinsky

==== Songs ====
- "Tango" (Jaci Velasquez song), a song on the 2008 album Love Out Loud
- "Tango" (Tananai song), a song on the 2023 album Rave, eclissi
- "Tango", a song on the 2006 album Public Warning by Lady Sovereign
- "Tango", a song on the 2001 album Nue by Lara Fabian
- "Tango", a song on the 2004 album Tango by Negative
- "Tango", a song on the 1994 album Thirsty Work by Status Quo

=== Television and telecommunications ===
- Tango (telecom), a mobile telephone operator in Luxembourg
- T.TV, a television channel in Luxembourg formerly known as Tango TV
- TV6 (Lithuania), also known as Tango TV in Lithuania

=== Other uses in arts, entertainment, and media ===
- And Tango Makes Three, also known as Tango a book about penguins
- Tango (comics), a comics anthology published in Australia since 1997
- Tango (novel), a 1989 novel by Alan Judd
- Tango (play), a 1964 play by Sławomir Mrożek
- Tango (ride), a type of amusement ride
- Tango (American magazine), an American magazine for adult women under 40
- Tango (Italian magazine), an Italian satirical magazine

== Military ==
- Tango (boat), also known as the Armored Troop Carrier, used in the Vietnam War
- Command Post TANGO, a U.S. military installation in South Korea
- Russian battleship Poltava (1894), sunk by the Japanese, raised and renamed Tango
- Tango-class submarine, the NATO code name for a Russian submarine class

== People ==
- Tango McCauley (born 1978), American gridiron football player
- Egisto Tango (1873–1951), Italian conductor
- Hiromi Tango (born 1976), Japanese installation and performance artist
- Tom Tango, pseudonym of a Canadian sabermetrician residing in USA
- Tanguito (1945–1972), a.k.a. Tango, Argentine singer-songwriter
- Virginia Tango Piatti (1869–1958), Italian writer and pacifist

== Places ==
- Tango, a neighborhood in Glan, Sarangani, Philippines
- Tango Monastery, near Thimphu, Bhutan
- Tango Province, Japan, an old province in today's northern Kyoto Prefecture
- Tangov (also spelled Tango), Azerbaijan, a village

== Software ==
- Tango (application), a video-messaging application software
- Tango (platform), augmented reality computing platform developed and authored by Google
- Tango (D library), an alternative to the Phobos standard library
- TANGO, a CORBA+ZMQ based control system
- Tango PCB and Tango Schematic, early Computer-aided engineering programs

== Transport ==
- Tango (tram), a tram type produced by Stadler Rail
- Air Canada Tango, a defunct low-cost airline launched by Air Canada
- Commuter Cars Tango, an electric vehicle manufactured in Spokane, Washington, U.S.
- Paraavis Tango, a Russian paraglider design
- Paraavis Tango Duett, a Russian paraglider design
- SEAT Tango, a roadster concept car built by the Spanish car maker SEAT
- SS Tango, a floating casino located off of Southern California from the late 1930s to the late 1940s, run by mobster Anthony Cornero

== Other uses ==
- Tango (drink), a soft drink manufactured in the United Kingdom
- Tango (mythology), the third child of the primordial mother goddess Varima-te-takere
- Tango, a satellite as part of the Prisma (satellite project) owned by the Swedish Space Corporation
- Tango, also known as Cluster 4, an ESA satellite in the Cluster II mission
- Tango, the letter T in the NATO phonetic alphabet
- Adidas Tango, a family of association football balls designed by Adidas
- Lactuca sativa 'Tango', a cultivar of leaf lettuce originated by W. Atlee Burpee & Co.
- Tango (1999–c. 2018), penguin raised by Roy and Silo

== See also ==
- Tanga (disambiguation)
- Tangos (disambiguation)
