= Tolo (surname) =

Tolo is a surname. Notable people with the surname include:

- Jack Tolo (1948–2011), South African politician
- Kate Tolo, Australian marketer, businesswoman, and biohacker
- Marianna Tolo (born 1989), Australian basketball player
- Marilù Tolo (born 1944), Italian film actress
- Mohammed Tolo, Saudi Arabian shot putter
- Nouhou Tolo (born 1997), Cameroonian football player

== See also ==
- Tolo (disambiguation)
- Tola (name)
- Tolos
- Tono (name)
- Toso (surname)
