= Toto =

Toto or TOTO may refer to:

== Arts and entertainment ==
=== Fictional characters ===
- Toto (Oz), a dog in the novel and film The Wonderful Wizard of Oz
  - Terry (dog), also known as Toto, the real life dog who portrayed Toto in the film
- Toto, in Japanese The Cat Returns
- a character in Le château à Toto (Toto’s castle), 1868 opéra bouffe
- the title character of Princess Toto, 1876 comic opera by W. S. Gilbert and Frederic Clay
- the title character of Toto of Arabia, 1965 Italian-Spanish adventure-comedy film
- Toto, one of the main characters of the 1987 Mexican sitcom television series ¡Ah qué Kiko!
- Toto, the main character of Toto Forever, 2010 short film
- Toto, a Gamera character from Gamera the Brave
- Toto, the main character in Stories Toto Told Me and In His Own Image by Frederick Rolfe

=== Other uses in arts and entertainment ===
- Toto (1933 film), a 1933 French film directed by Jacques Tourneur
- Toto (band), an American pop rock band
  - Toto (album), their debut album
- Toto!: The Wonderful Adventure, Japanese manga series
- "Toto" (Drax Project song), a 2018 song
- "Toto" (Noizy song), a 2018 song featuring RAF Camora

== Gaming and gambling ==
- Football pools, called "toto" in several languages
- Toto (lottery), a lottery in Singapore
- TotoGaming, an Armenian gaming operator
- Sports Toto, a Malaysian gambling company

== People ==
- Toto people, ethnonym for isolated tribal group from Totopara, Alipurduar district, West Bengal, India
- Toto language, Sino-Tibetan language spoken by the Toto people

=== Performing names ===
- Toto (clown), stage name of Armando Novello (1888–1938), Swiss-born vaudeville and stage performer
- Totò, stage name of Antonio De Curtis (1898–1967), Italian comedian, actor, writer, and songwriter
- Totó la Momposina, Colombian singer Sonia Bazanta Vides (born 1948)

=== Other personal names ===
- Toto (surname)
- Toto (given name)
- Toto (nickname)

== Places ==
- Toto, Nigeria, Local Government Area of Nasarawa State
- Toto, Indiana, U.S., an unincorporated community
- To-To, California, U.S., former Native American settlement at (and nickname for) Totoma, California
- Toto, Gumla, census town in Jharkhand, India

== Sports ==
- Toto African, a football club in Mwanza, Tanzania
- Toto Cup, an association football tournament in Israel
- Toto Japan Classic, an annual women's professional golf tournament

== Other uses ==
- Toto (gorilla) (1931–1968), a female gorilla adopted by A. Maria Hoyt
- Toto, a cheetah cub seen in the BBC series Big Cat Diary
- Toto (dessert), a small coconut cake in Jamaican cuisine
- Toto Ltd., a Japanese toilet manufacturer
- Toto (mythology), a chief in Māori mythology
- Typhonian Order, formerly known as Typhonian Ordo Templi Orientis (TOTO), an occult magical order
- TOtable Tornado Observatory, a tornado observation device
- Tongue of the Ocean, a deep oceanic trench in the Bahamas
- Toto, a name for an electric rickshaw in the Indian subcontinent

== See also ==
- Tōto (disambiguation)
- In toto
- Toto and Cleopatra, a 1963 Italian adventure-comedy film
