= Extreme points of Azerbaijan =

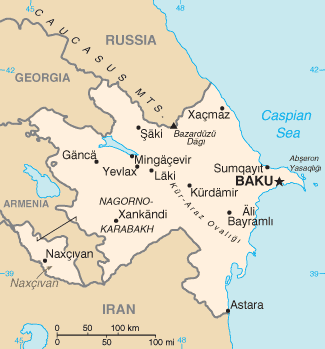
Map of Azerbaijan

This is a list of the extreme points of Azerbaijan, the points that are farther north, south, east or west than any other location.

== Latitude and longitude ==
=== Azerbaijan ===
This section includes only the central contiguous section of Azerbaijan.

- North: Khachmaz Rayon (41°54′N 46°25′E)
- South: near Tangov, Astara (38°24′N 48°39′E)
- West:
  - Near İkinci Şıxlı, Qazakh (41°18′N 45°0′E)
  - The nearby enclave of Yuxari Askipara; is marginally further west (41°04′N 45°01′E).
- East: Çilov, Baku (40°18′N 50°33′E)

=== Nakhchivan ===
This section includes only the exclave of Nakhchivan.

- North:
  - Near Günnüt, Sharur (39°46′N 45°4′E)
  - The enclave of Karki; extends slightly further north (39°48′N 44°58′E).
- South: Ordubad (38°51′N 46°9′E)
- West: Sadarak Rayon (39°42′N 44°46′E)
- East: Ordubad (38°51′N 46°9′E)

== Altitude ==
- Maximum: Bazardüzü Dağı, 4,466 m (41°13′14″N 47°51′28″E)
- Minimum: Caspian Sea, -28 m

== See also ==
- Extreme points of Earth
- Geography of Azerbaijan
