= Tonto (disambiguation) =

Tonto is the fictional sidekick to the Lone Ranger, an American Western character.

Tonto may also refer to:

== People ==
- Tonto Apache, one of the groups of Western Apache people in the US
- Tonto Apache Tribe of Arizona, a federally recognized tribe of Tonto Apache people
- Tonto Dikeh (born 1985), Nigerian actress, singer, and philanthropist
- Tonto Coleman (1907–1973), American football coach and sports administrator

== Places ==
=== US state of Arizona ===
- Tonto Basin, a watershed in the center of the state
  - Tonto Basin, Arizona, a census-designated place in Gila County
  - Tonto Creek, a stream along the Mogollon Rim
- Tonto National Forest, a US national forest
- Tonto National Monument, a US national monument
- Tonto Natural Bridge, a travertine arch in Gila County
- Tonto Trail, a hiking trail on the South Rim of the Grand Canyon
- Tonto Village, Arizona, a census-designated place in Gila County

=== Mexico ===
- Tonto River, a river in the state of Oaxaca

== Entertainment ==
- Tonto (Metabarons), a character in the Metabarons comic book
- TONTO, an acronym for the synthesizer system of Tonto's Expanding Head Band
- "Tonto" (song), by the American math rock band Battles, from their album Mirrored
  - Tonto+, the EP centered on the song

== Other uses ==
- Tonto (beverage), an alcoholic beverage from Uganda
- Tonto Group, a geologic formation visible in the Grand Canyon

== See also ==
- Merlin Tonto, a hybrid personal computer/telecommunications terminal
- Under the Tonto Rim (disambiguation)
- Tonho (name)
- Tonio (name)
- Toñito (name)
- Tonko
