= Tengo =

Tengo may refer to:

- Tengo Miura (born 1991), Japanese footballer
- "Tengo", a song by Sandro de América, 1968
- Tengo, the main character in the 1987 Sheila Gordon novel Waiting for the Rain
- Tengo Kawana, a character in the 2009–10 Haruki Murakami novel 1Q84

== See also ==
- Tango (disambiguation)
