= Tango! =

Tango! may refer to:

- ¡Tango!, a 1933 Argentine musical romance film

== See also ==
- Tango, a partner dance
- Tango (disambiguation)
