= Toto (given name) =

Toto is a given name which may refer to:

- Toto of Nepi (died 768), Roman duke
- Toto (died 817), founder of Ottobeuren Abbey
- Toto Landero (born 1995), Filipino boxer
- Toto Makgolokwe (died 1927), paramount chief of the Batlharo tribe of South Africa
- Toto Mwandjani, Malagasy guitarist
- Toto Tamuz (born 1988), Nigerian-born Israeli footballer
- Toto Wong (born 1999), Hong Kong swimmer

== See also ==
- Toto (disambiguation)
- Toto (nickname)
- Toto (surname)
- Tono (name)
