= Tono (name) =

Tono or Toño is a masculine given name or nickname that is a diminutive form. Tono is a Catalan, Galician and Spanish diminutive form of Anton, Antoni and Antonio and Toño is a Spanish diminutive form of Antonio. Both spellings are in use in Spain, parts of the United States, Mexico, Cuba, Dominican Republic, Guatemala, Honduras, El Salvador, Nicaragua, Costa Rica, Western Panama, Colombia, Venezuela, Peru, Ecuador, Bolivia, Chile, Paraguay, Argentina, Uruguay, and the Falkland Islands, while Tōno is a Japanese surname.

== Nickname/stage name ==
- Tono (artist), professional/stage name of the Japanese manga artist
- Tono, pseudonym of Antonio Lara de Gavilán (1896–1978), Spanish humorist and writer
- Toño (footballer, born 1979), nickname for Antonio Rodríguez Martínez, (born 1979), Spanish footballer, goalkeeper
- Toño (footballer, born 1986), nickname for Antonio Ramírez Martínez, (born 1986), Spanish footballer, goalkeeper
- Toño (footballer, born 1989), nickname for Antonio García Aranda, (born 1989), Spanish footballer, defender
- Tono (singer), professional/stage name of the Japanese actress and singer
- Toño Bicicleta, nickname of Francisco Antonio García López (1943–1995), Puerto Rican criminal
- Toño Rosario, nickname of Máximo Antonio del Rosario, (born 1955), Dominican musician
- Toño Salazar, nickname of Antonio Salazar, (1897–1986), Salvadoran caricaturist, illustrator and diplomat

== Given name ==
- Tono Andreu (1915–1981), Argentine film actor
- Tono Maria, Brazilian freak
- Toño Mauri, Mexican singer and actor
- Tono Stano (born 1960), Slovak photographer

== Surname ==
- Asuka Tono, Japanese actress
- Eijirō Tōno (1907–1994), Japanese actor
- Hiroaki Tōno (1939–2025), Japanese Go player
- Kanami Tōno, Japanese guitarist of Band-Maid
- Maiko Tōno, (born 1973), Japanese actress
- Shun Tono (born 1986), Japanese baseball player
- Takuma Tono (1891–1987), Japanese landscape architect

== Fictional characters ==
- Jek Tono Porkins, Star Wars character
- Tigre Toño, the Spanish name for Tony The Tiger.

== See also ==
- Tolo (surname)
- Ton (given name)
- Tona (name)
- Tone (name)
- Tong (surname)
- Tonho (name)
- Tonio (name)
- Tonko
- Tony (name)
- Toon (name)
- Toso (surname)
- Toto (given name)
- Toto (nickname)
- Toto (surname)
