= Toto (surname) =

Toto is a surname. Notable people with the surname include:

- Antonio Toto (1498–1554), Italian painter and architect
- Gerald Toto (born 1967), French composer and performer
- Jonathan Toto (born 1990), French footballer of Cameroonian heritage
- Ismet Toto (1908–1937), Albanian bureaucrat, publicist, writer and political activist
- Linet Toto (born 1997), Kenyan politician
- Paolo Totò (born 1991), Italian cyclist

== See also ==
- Toto (disambiguation)
- Toto (given name)
- Toto (nickname)
- Tono (name)
