= Tangos =

Tangos may refer to:

- "Tangos" (song), a song popularized in Spain
- Tangos (district), a district or barangay in Navotas, Philippines
- Tangos, a 1973 album by Buenos Aires 8
- Tangos (album), a 2014 album by Rubén Blades

== See also ==
- Tango (disambiguation)
