= Tongo =

Tongo may refer to:

== Places ==
- Tongo, Ghana, town in Bolgatanga region of northeast Ghana
- Tongo, Sierra Leone, or Tongoma, town in Kenema District of eastern Sierra Leone
  - Tongo Field, home ground of its football club the Gem Stars
- Tongo, Ethiopia, town in Benishangul-Gumuz Zone of Ethiopia
- Tongo Island, an island of Albania in the Ionian Sea

== In fiction ==
- Tongo (Star Trek), fictional card game
- Tongo, TV apeman, visitor to Gilligan's Island

== Other uses ==
- Tongo (entertainer) (1957–2023), a Peruvian Cumbia singer
- Tongo, common name for the red mangrove Rhizophora mangle in Tonga
- Pak-Tong language, also known as Tongo, an Austronesian language of Papua New Guinea
- Sranan Tongo, a Creole language of Suriname

== See also ==
- Sranan Tongo, also known as Suriname Creole
- Togo (disambiguation)
- Tonga (disambiguation)
- Tonho (name)
- Tonio (name)
- Tonko
