= Tonko =

Tonko is a South Slavic masculine given name.

In Croatian, it is a hypocorism of the name Antun and other cognates of Antonius.

It is found in Slovene as a diminutive form of Anton, Antonij, and Antonijo in Slovenia.

== Given name ==
- Tonko Lonza (1930 – 2018), Croatian actor
- Tonko Soljan, Croatian American film and television producer

== Surname ==
- Paul Tonko (born 1949), American politician

== See also ==
- Tanko (name)
- Tenko (disambiguation)
- Tokko (disambiguation)
- Toko (disambiguation)
- Tondo (disambiguation)
- Tongo (disambiguation)
- Tonho (name)
- Tonio (name)
- Tonk (disambiguation)
- Tonka (name)
- Tono (name)
- Tonto (disambiguation)
