= Tenko =

Tenko may refer to:

- Tenko (fox)
- Tenko (TV series), a joint BBC/Australian Broadcasting Corporation (ABC) television drama
- Tenkō, the ideological reversal of Japanese socialists between 1925 and 1945

== People ==
- Princess Tenko, a Japanese magician, upon whom the cartoon Tenko and the Guardians of the Magic was based
  - Tenko and the Guardians of the Magic, an animated cartoon created by Saban Entertainment in 1995

== Fictional characters ==
- A character from the anime The Law of Ueki
- A character from the anime Kamisama Kazoku
- Tenko Chabashira, a character from Danganronpa V3: Killing Harmony
- Tenko Shimura, a character from My Hero Academia

== See also ==
- Tonko
