= Under the Tonto Rim (novel) =

Novel by Zane Grey

Under the Tonto Rim is a Western novel by Zane Grey first published in book form by Harper & Brothers in 1926. Prior to publication of the book the story had been serialized in 1925 as "The Bee Hunter" in Ladies' Home Journal (Feb–May 1925).

The book tells the story of a young lady, Lucy Watson, the daughter of a saloon-keeper. After her father's death Lucy takes a newly created position as Welfare Instructor among a community of backwoods people in Arizona.

A Grosset and Dunlap edition also appeared in 1926.

The New York Times describes the book as "frequently filmed". The 1928 silent version was directed by Herman C. Raymaker and starred Richard Arlen and Mary Brian.

== See also ==
- Under the Tonto Rim (1928 film)
- Under the Tonto Rim (1933 film)
- Under the Tonto Rim (1947 film)
