= Tondi =

Tondi may refer to:

- Tondi, Tallinn, district of Kristiine, Tallinn, Estonia
- Tondi Elektroonika, factory for electrotechnical components located in Tallinn, Estonia

== See also ==
- Tondo (disambiguation)
- Tyndis, Greek name of Tondi, an ancient Indian port on the Malabar Coast during the Chera kingdom
- Thondi or Tondi, town in Tamil Nadu, India, ancient port during the Pandyan kingdom
