= Tokkō =

Tokkō or Tokko may refer to:

- Tokubetsu Kōgekitai, or Tokkō (特攻) (literally: "Special Attack Unit"), the Japanese aviators conducting kamikaze attacks in World War II
- Tokubetsu Kōtō Keisatsu, or Tokkō (特高) (literally: "Special Higher Police"), the Japanese secret police 1911 to 1945
- Tokko (manga), a Japanese manga series by Tōru Fujisawa
- Tokko (river), a river in Yakutia, Russia
- Tokko, Russia, a selo (village) in Zharkhansky National Nasleg, Olyokminsky District, Sakha Republic

== See also ==
- Tonko
