= Varsity (film) =

1928 film

- Lobby card
- Directed by: Frank Tuttle
- Screenplay by: Howard Estabrook; George Marion Jr. Wells Root
- Produced by: Jesse L. Lasky; Adolph Zukor
- Starring: Charles "Buddy" Rogers; Mary Brian; Chester Conklin; Phillips Holmes; Robert Ellis; John Westwood
- Cinematography: Archie Stout
- Edited by: Verna Willis
- Production company: Paramount Pictures
- Distributed by: Paramount Pictures
- Release date: October 27, 1928
- Running time: 67 minutes
- Country: United States
- Languages: Sound (Part-talkie); English intertitles

Varsity is a lost 1928 American sound part-talkie comedy film directed by Frank Tuttle, written by Howard Estabrook, George Marion Jr. and Wells Root, and starring Charles "Buddy" Rogers, Mary Brian, Chester Conklin, Phillips Holmes, Robert Ellis and John Westwood. In addition to sequences with audible dialogue or talking sequences, the film features a synchronized musical score and sound effects along with English intertitles. The soundtrack was recorded using the Western Electric sound-on-film system. The film was released on October 27, 1928, by Paramount Pictures.

== Plot ==
At Princeton University, beloved janitor "Pop" Conlan (Chester Conklin) secretly watches over a new freshman, Jimmy Duffy (Charles "Buddy" Rogers), who has just arrived from an orphanage. Unknown to Jimmy, "Pop" is actually his father. Because of his own troubled and dissipated past, "Pop" has concealed their relationship, changed Jimmy's name, and allowed the boy to grow up believing his father is dead.

Quaint and whimsical, "Pop" harbors secret struggles with alcohol but channels his life into guiding Jimmy from the shadows. His pride grows as Jimmy thrives at Princeton, eventually becoming an honor student in his sophomore year. But concern arises when Jimmy begins keeping company with a hard-drinking crowd, including classmates like Middlebrook (Phillips Holmes) and Rod Luke (Robert Ellis).

During a wild carnival night in Trenton, Jimmy gets caught up in a drunken escapade. There, he meets Fay (Mary Brian), a kind-hearted showgirl who helps him stay out of serious trouble. A romance blossoms between them.

Jimmy soon takes on the responsibility of collecting money for a student fund. However, after a quarrel with Fay and during "Pop’s" absence, he falls into another extended drinking spree. When he sobers, Jimmy is horrified to find himself accused of gambling away the college funds.

Desperate to clear Jimmy's name, "Pop" intervenes with Fay's help. In the process, he is seriously injured, despite Jimmy's attempt to protect him—even at the cost of his own reputation. Through their combined efforts, Jimmy is exonerated.

Following his graduation, Jimmy marries Fay, still unaware that "Pop" is his father. When the newlyweds come to bid farewell, Fay senses the truth. "Pop" quietly confirms her suspicion but swears her to silence. As Jimmy and Fay leave for their honeymoon, "Pop" returns to his humble janitorial duties, content with the secret joy of having secured his son's future and happiness.

== Cast ==
- Charles "Buddy" Rogers as Jimmy Duffy
- Mary Brian as Fay
- Chester Conklin as Pop Conlan
- Phillips Holmes as Middlebrook
- Robert Ellis as Rod Luke
- John Westwood as The Senior

== Music ==
The film featured a theme song entitled "My Varsity Girl (I'll Cling To You)" with music by W. Franke Harling and lyrics by Alfred Bryan.

== Censorship ==
When Varsity was released, many states and cities in the United States had censor boards that could require cuts or other eliminations before the film could be shown. Consistent with Prohibition, the Kansas censor board ordered the elimination of scenes of Buddy Rogers at a bar.

== See also ==
- List of early sound feature films (1926–1929)
