= Toñito (name) =

Toñito or Tonito is a Spanish given name and nickname derived from Antonio. It is loosely equivalent to Little Tony in English. Notable people with this nickname include the following:

- Antonio Jesús García González, known as Toñito (born 1977), Spanish retired footballer
- Antonio Silva Delgado, known as Toñito Silva, Puerto Rican politician
- Javier Antonio Colón, known as Toñito Colón (born 1969), Puerto Rican basketball player
- Tonito Willett (born 1983), West Indian cricketer
- Tonito Rivera, common nickname for José Antonio Rivera (1963 – 2005), Puerto Rican boxer, who was also known as El Gallo Rivera

== See also ==
- Tonino (disambiguation)
- Tonio (name)
- Tonita (name)
- Tonite (disambiguation)
- Tonto (disambiguation)
