= Tonga (disambiguation) =

Tonga is a Pacific Island nation whose people are known as Tongans.

Tonga may also refer to:

== Ethnic groups ==
- Tonga people (Zambia and Zimbabwe)
- Tonga people (Malawi)
- Tongans, a Polynesian group

== Languages ==
- Tongan language, or Tonga, a Polynesian language spoken in Tonga in the South Pacific
- Tonga language (Zambia and Zimbabwe), or Chitonga, a Bantu language spoken in Zambia and Zimbabwe
- Tonga language (Mozambique), or Gitonga, a Bantu language spoken in Mozambique
- Tonga language (Malawi), or Chitonga, a Bantu language spoken in Malawi
- Ten'edn, also known as Tonga or Mos, a Mon-Khmer language spoken in Thailand and Malaysia

== Places ==
- Kingdom of Tonga (1900–1970), protected state of the United Kingdom
- Tonga, Cameroon, a town and commune in Ouest region
- Tonga River, Fiji
- Tonga Island, New Zealand
- Tonga, Mpumalanga, South Africa, a town
- Tonga, southern Sudan, a village that housed a Catholic mission station; see Shilluk people
- Tonga, Tuvalu, a village on the island of Nanumanga, Tuvalu
- Tonga Plate, a small tectonic plate in the southwest Pacific Ocean
- Tonga Trench, an oceanic trench in the south Pacific Ocean
- Tonga, an area of northwest Unst, Scotland

== Polynesian mythology ==
- the southwest wind, the last wind to be reined in by Māui
- the name of the first woman in Tonga

== Other uses ==
- Tonga (name), a list of those with Tonga as either a given name or surname
- A version of Intel's Pentium II microprocessor designed for laptops
- Operation Tonga, an airborne operation during the World War II Battle of Normandy
- Tonga Cup, Tonga's premier knockout football tournament
- Tanga (carriage) or Tonga, a horse-drawn carriage in India, Pakistan, and Bangladesh
- Tonga, codename of AMD Radeon GPUs; see R9 285/380/380X
- Tonga (insect), a genus of tropical grasshoppers found in Asia and Oceania

== See also ==
- Tongo (disambiguation)
- Tanga (disambiguation)
