= Tangos North =

Barangay in Navotas, Philippines

Barangay Tangos North
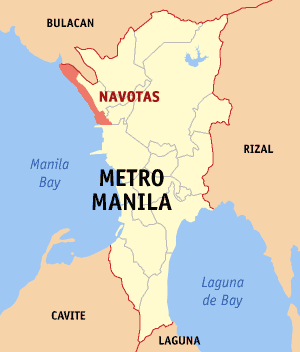
- Map of Metro Manila showing the location of Navotas its city.
- Coordinates: 14°40′28″N 120°55′59″E
- Country: Philippines
- Region: National Capital Region
- City: Navotas
- Congressional districts: Part of the Navotas Congressional District

Government
  - Barangay chairman: Armando Roque

Population (2007)
  - Total: 33,211

Tangos North is one of the eighteen barangays (or districts) of Navotas in the Philippines. It is divided to Tangos North, Navotas and Tangos South, Navotas on 2013.

== See also ==
- Tangos, Navotas
