= Tanga =

Tanga may refer to:

== Places ==
=== Burkina Faso ===
- Tanga, Andemtenga, a town in eastern Burkina Faso
- Tanga-Pela, a village in northern-central Burkina Faso

=== Tanzania ===
- Tanga Region, Tanzanian administrative region named after the city
  - Tanga, Tanzania, a city and port on the coast of Tanzania
  - Tanga District, Tanzanian district
- Tanga Airport

=== Other places ===
- Tanga Islands, an island group in Papua New Guinea
- Tånga och Rögle, a village in southern Sweden
- Nosy Tanga, an islet in Diana, Madagascar

== Money ==
- Tanga (coin), subunit of the Portuguese Indian rupia from the 16th-century until 1958
- Tanga (currency), subunit of the Tajikistani ruble from 1995 to 2000

== Entertainment ==
- Tanga (film), a 1987 Brazilian comedy film
- "Tangá", a 1943 pioneering Afro-Cuban jazz composition by Mario Bauzá

== People ==
- Tanga Byaling, Indian politician from Arunachal Pradesh
- Tanga Loa (born 1983), American professional wrestler
- Tanga Moreau, Belgian model
- Brian Tanga (born 1995), Kenyan rugby union player
- Jephte Tanga (born 2004), English professional footballer
- M R Tanga, Indian politician from Karnataka
- Yoan Tanga (born 1996), French professional rugby union player

== Other ==
- 1595 Tanga, a main-belt asteroid discovered in 1930, named after Tanga, Tanzania
- Battle of Tanga, an unsuccessful British attack to capture the Tanzanian city and German East Africa during World War I
- Tanga (carriage) or tonga, a light horse-drawn carriage used in India, Pakistan, and Bangladesh
- Tanga Cement, a cement company of Tanzania, named after the city
- Tanga language, a Bantu language of Cameroon and Equatorial Guinea
- Tanga Station, a monorail station in Kitakyushu, Japan
- Tanga, a style of thong underwear or beachwear

== See also ==
- Tamga, an abstract seal or stamp used by Eurasian nomadic peoples
- Tamga (genus), a Precambrian fossil organism
- Tangga language, an Oceanic language
- Tango (disambiguation)
- Tanka (disambiguation)
- Thanga, a village in Manipur, India
- Tonga (disambiguation)
