= Affairs of Cappy Ricks =

1937 film by Ralph Staub

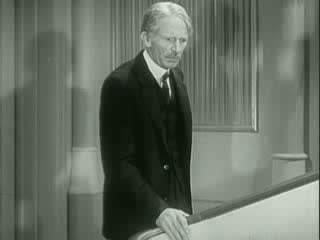
- Walter Brennan in the film
- Directed by: Ralph Staub
- Written by: Lester Cole (writer); Peter B. Kyne (characters)
- Produced by: Burt Kelly
- Starring: Walter Brennan; Mary Brian; Lyle Talbot; Frank Shields; Frank Melton
- Cinematography: Ernest Miller
- Edited by: William Morgan
- Music by: Alberto Colombo
- Production company: Republic Pictures
- Distributed by: Republic Pictures
- Release date: May 24, 1937
- Running time: 61 minutes
- Country: United States
- Language: English

Affairs of Cappy Ricks is a 1937 American comedy drama film directed by Ralph Staub and starring Walter Brennan, Mary Brian, Lyle Talbot, Frank Shields, and Frank Melton. It was produced and distributed by Republic Pictures. The plot is about a captain who returns home from a long voyage and has to take charge of his business and family.

== Plot ==
Cappy Ricks (Walter Brennan) has returned home from a long voyage at sea only to find that his family and business are not as he left them. His daughter Frankie (Mary Brian) is engaged to a dimwit that he isn't fond of. His future mother-in-law already owns 51% of his business and has plans to replace his prized ship. A marriage date is set for his daughter. The business is to be merged with his long standing competitor. Cappy Ricks knows he has to end the chaos and set things straight. He brings everyone on his ship as there he can be the Captain and in charge. He has a two day excursion extend into an 8 week voyage. Then they are lost on an uninhabited island. And as in other movies of that period, he uses the island to straighten out the arrogance of the rich ladies and the weakness of sons under mothers dominance. They were never lost for he had secret radio contact. Captain Braddock "rescues" them but his modern electronic ship fails in a storm and only Cappy knows how to sail. The merger is cancelled, Mrs. Peasely is to move from his house, and his daughter is to marry the man she really loves all with a happy ending.

== Cast ==
- Walter Brennan as Cappy Ricks
- Mary Brian as Frances 'Frankie' Ricks
- Lyle Talbot as Bill Peck
- Frank Shields as Waldo P. Bottomly Jr.
- Frank Melton as Matt Peasely
- Georgia Caine as Mrs. Amanda Peasely
- Phyllis Barry as Ellen Ricks Peasely
- William B. Davidson as Waldo P. Bottomly Sr.
- Frank Shannon as Captain Braddock
- Howard Brooks as Revere the Butler

== Release ==
The Republic Pictures film was released May 24, 1937.
