= Tonio (name) =

Tonio is an Italian and Spanish given name and nickname in use in Italy, Spain, parts of the United States, Mexico, Cuba, Dominican Republic, Guatemala, Honduras, El Salvador, Nicaragua, Costa Rica, Western Panama, Colombia, Venezuela, Peru, Ecuador, Bolivia, Chile, Paraguay, Argentina, Uruguay, and the Falkland Islands. As a given name it is a diminutive form of Antonio. Notable people with the name include the following:

== Given name ==
- Tonio Arango (born 1963), German actor
- Tonio Biondini (born 1945), Italian cross-country skier
- Tonio Borg (born 1957), Maltese politician
- Tonio di Paolo, American opera singer.
- Tonio Fenech (born 1969), Maltese politician
- Tonio Mallia (born 1955), Maltese judge
- Tonio Teklić (born 1999), Croatian footballer

== Nickname/stagename ==
- Tonio K (born Steven M. Krikorian, 1950), American singer/songwriter
- Tonio Selwart, nickname of Antonio Franz Theus Selmair-Selwart (1896 – 2002), German actor
- Vitantonio Liuzzi known as Tonio (born 1980), Italian racing driver

== Fictional Characters ==
- Tonio, the baritone fool in the Italian opera, Pagliacci
- Tonio Trussardi, a chef from the anime/manga Diamond is Unbreakable

== See also ==
- Tokio (given name)
- Tondo (disambiguation)
- Tongo (disambiguation)
- Tonho (name)
- Toni, name
- Tonia (name)
- Tonic (disambiguation)
- Tonie, name
- Tonin (name)
- Tonino (disambiguation)
- Toñito (name)
- Tonko
- Tono (name)
- Tonto (disambiguation)
