= Shadows of Sing Sing =

1933 film directed by Phil Rosen

- Directed by: Phil Rosen
- Screenplay by: Albert DeMond
- Story by: Kathryn Scola; Doris Malloy
- Produced by: Sid Rogell
- Starring: Mary Brian; Bruce Cabot; Grant Mitchell
- Cinematography: Benjamin Kline
- Edited by: John Rawlins
- Production company: Columbia Pictures
- Release date: October 27, 1933 (US)
- Running time: 65 minutes
- Country: United States
- Language: English

Shadows of Sing Sing is a 1933 American pre-Code crime drama film, directed by Phil Rosen. It stars Mary Brian, Bruce Cabot, and Grant Mitchell, and was released on October 27, 1933.

== Cast list ==
- Mary Brian as Muriel Ross, aka Muriel Rossi
- Bruce Cabot as Bob Martel
- Grant Mitchell as Joe Martel
- Harry Woods as Al Rossi
- Claire DuBrey as Angela Crane
- Bradley Page as Slick Hale
- Irving Bacon as Highbrow
- Dewey Robinson as Dumpy
- Fred Kelsey as Murphy
- Charles Wilson
