= Brown of Harvard (1926 film) =

1926 film

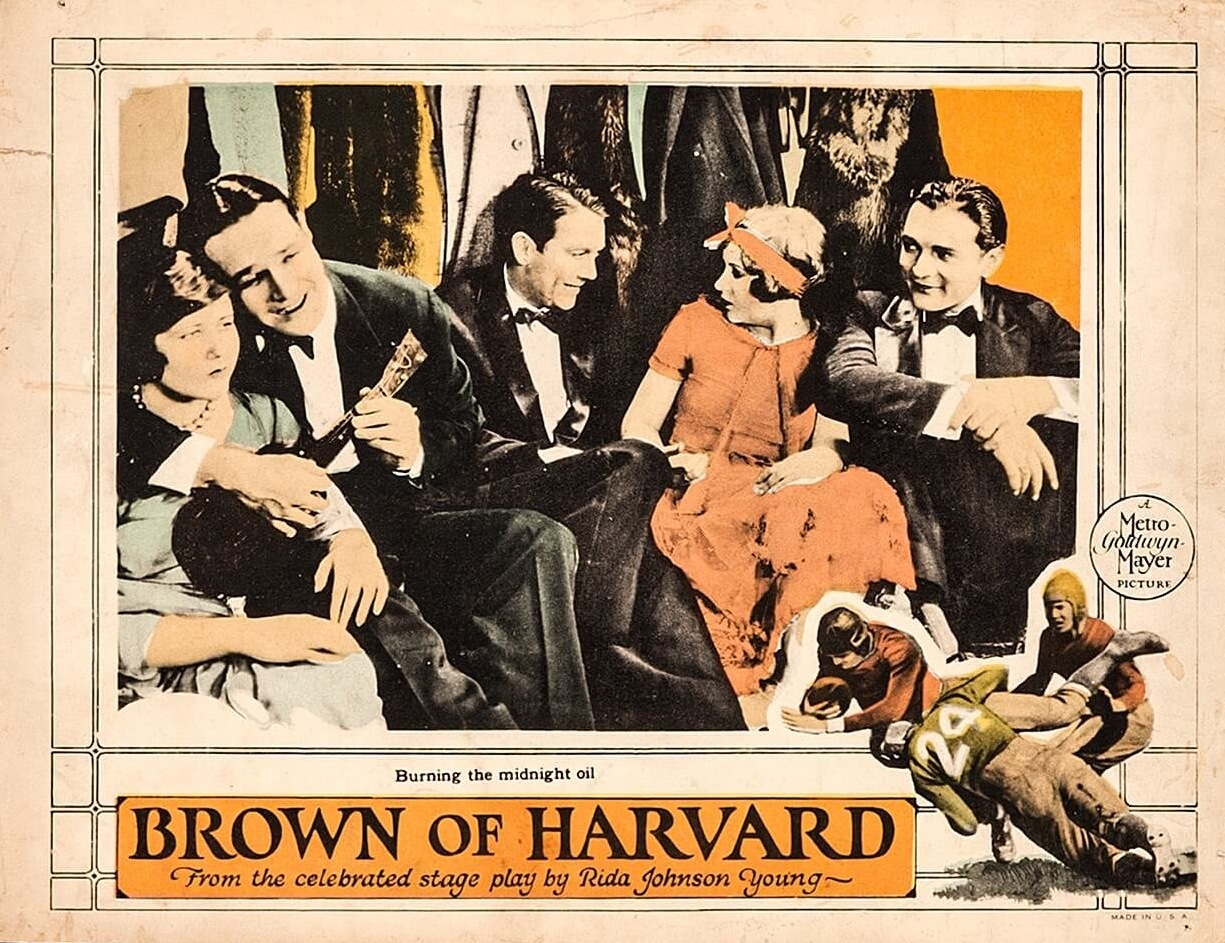
- Lobby card
- Directed by: Jack Conway
- Written by: Melvin Ellis; Donald Ogden Stewart; A. P. Younger
- Based on: Brown of Harvard (play) by Rida Johnson Young
- Produced by: Harry Rapf
- Starring: Jack Pickford; Mary Brian; Mary Alden; Francis X. Bushman Jr.; William Haines
- Cinematography: Ira H. Morgan
- Edited by: Frank Davis
- Distributed by: Metro-Goldwyn-Mayer
- Release date: May 2, 1926
- Running time: 85 minutes
- Country: United States
- Language: Silent (English intertitles)

The full film

Brown of Harvard is a 1926 American silent drama film directed by Jack Conway, and starring William Haines, Jack Pickford and Mary Brian. Released by Metro-Goldwyn-Mayer, the film is based on the successful 1906 Broadway play Brown of Harvard by Rida Johnson Young, who also co-wrote the popular music for the play along with Melvin Ellis. The film is the best known of the three Brown of Harvard films. It was John Wayne's film debut. Uncredited, Wayne played a Yale football player. Grady Sutton and Robert Livingston, both of whom went on to long and successful careers, also appear uncredited. The 1918 film included future Boston Redskins coach William "Lone Star" Dietz and the only Washington State University football team to win a Rose Bowl.

== Plot ==
Harvard University student Tom Brown is a handsome, athletic, and carefree young man who has a reputation as a Don Juan among the ladies. Although he is popular on campus, he finds himself at odds with Bob McAndrew, a studious, reserved boy who becomes his chief rival for the affections of beautiful Mary Abbott, a professor's daughter. Tom rooms with Jim Doolittle, an awkward weakling but goodhearted backwoods youth who idolizes him. The brash and cocky Brown easily wins over his dormitory mates, but refuses to let them ostracize Jim.

One night at a party, Tom forcibly kisses Mary, which initiates a fight with Bob. Afterwards, Tom challenges Bob to a rowing competition; Bob is stroker on the college rowing team. Tom ends up losing. When he forces a confession of love from Mary, he begins to drink in shame. When he replaces Bob in a match against Yale, Tom collapses and is disgraced. He is persuaded by his father to go out for football.

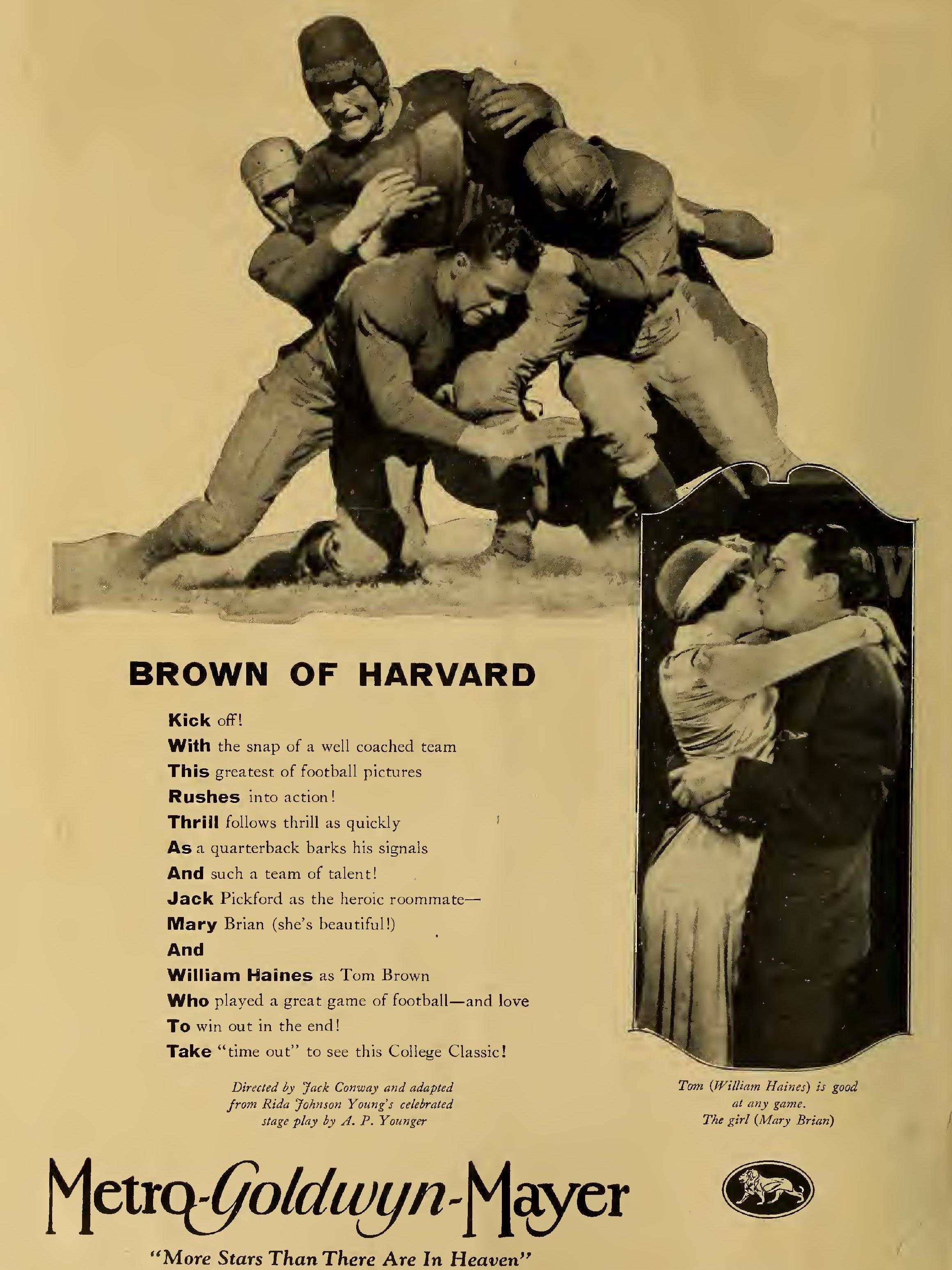
Ad in 1926 Film Fun

Tom visits Jim, who is ill in bed. They read in The Harvard Crimson gossip column that Tom is to be dropped from the football team before the big game against Yale. After Tom leaves to tell his parents, Jim receives a call from the coach saying Tom has not been dropped but will be if he does not show up in 20 minutes. Jim runs coatless into heavy rain to catch him, collapses in the street, but manages to deliver the message. After taking care of Jim, Tom joins the team. In the hospital, Jim persuades Mary to give Tom another chance. Before the game, Tom tries unsuccessfully to reach Jim’s nurse, then leads the team to a close win and at a crucial point gives Bob a chance to score for the team. He immediately leaves for the hospital but arrives just after Jim has died. Mary joins and comforts him as he grieves.

== Cast ==
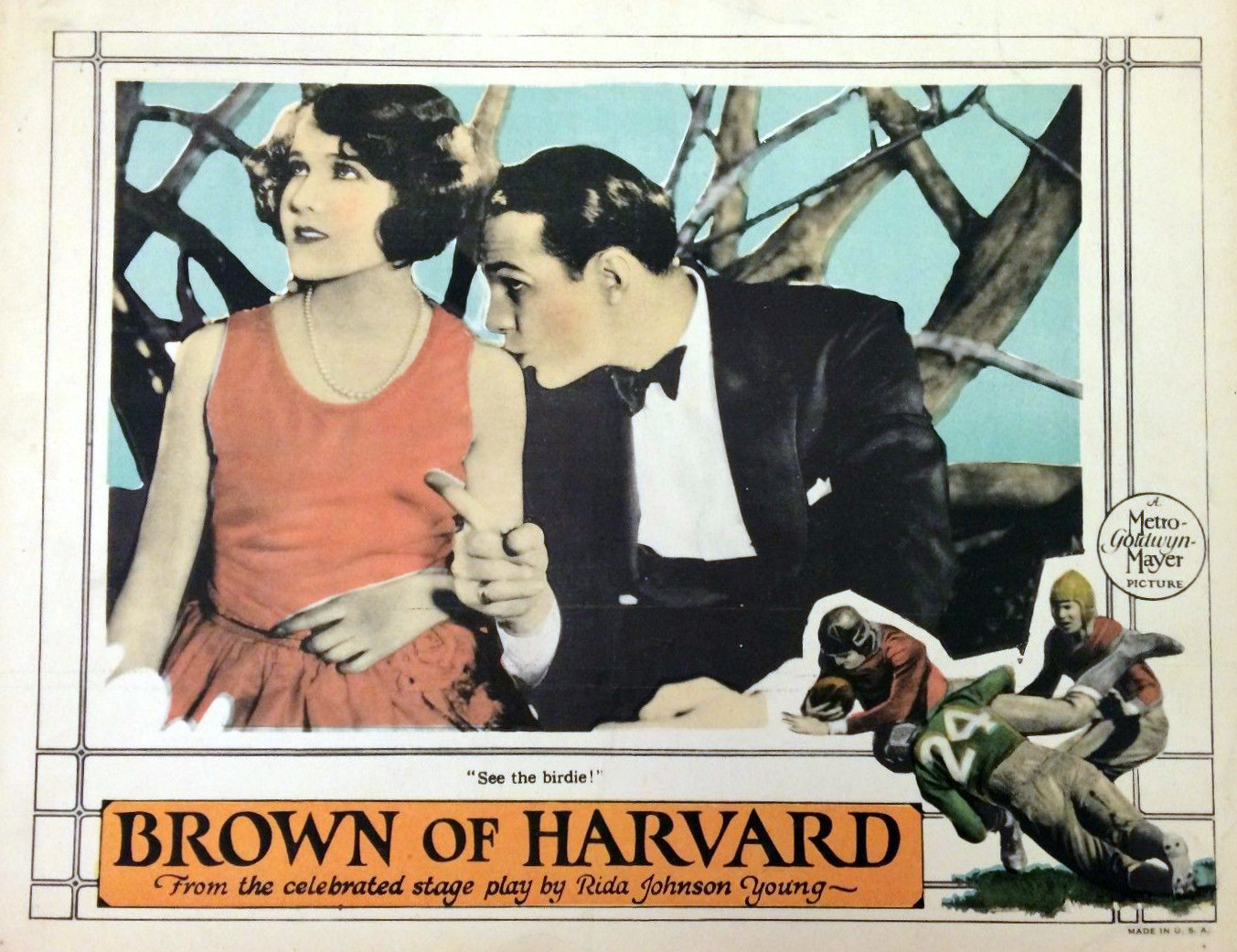
Lobby card with Haines and Brian

- William Haines as Tom Brown
- Jack Pickford as Jim Doolittle
- Mary Brian as Mary Abbott
- Francis X. Bushman Jr. as Bob McAndrew
- Mary Alden as Mrs. Brown
- David Torrence as Mr. Brown
- Edward Connelly as Professor Abbott
- Guinn Williams as Hal Walters
- Donald Reed as Reggie Smythe
- Richard Alexander as Football Fan (uncredited)
- Robert Livingston as Harvard Student / Yale Cheering Section / Harvard Spectator (uncredited)
- Doris Lloyd as Nurse (uncredited)
- Grady Sutton as One of the Dickeys (uncredited)
- Daniel G. Tomlinson as Football Trainer (uncredited)
- John Wayne as a Yale College football player (uncredited)

== See also ==
- List of American football films
