= Toho (disambiguation) =

Toho is a Japanese film production and distribution company.

Toho, Tōhō, or Touhou may also refer to:

== Locations ==
- Tōhō, Fukuoka (東峰)
- Toho, Indonesia, a district in Pontianak Regency, West Kalimantan, Indonesia

== Education ==
- Toho Gakuen School of Music (桐朋)
- Toho University (東邦)

== Companies ==
- Toho Bank, Fukushima, Japan (東邦)
- Toho Zinc (東邦)

== Other uses ==
- Toho (kachina), a hunter spirit for the Hopi and Zuni tribes
- Touhou Project (also known as the Toho Project), a shoot 'em up video game series (東方)

== See also ==
- Tonho (name)
- Touhou Island
