= Tolos =

Tolos is a surname. Notable people with the surname include:

- Chris Tolos (1929–2005), Canadian professional wrestler
- John Tolos (1930–2009), Canadian professional wrestler and professional wrestling manager, brother of Chris

== See also ==
- Tolo (disambiguation)
- Tiele people
