= Toko =

Toko may refer to:

== Locations ==
- Toko, Cameroon, a commune in Cameroon
- Toko, New Zealand, a small rural settlement near Stratford, New Zealand
- Toko, Queensland, a locality in the Shires of Boulia and Diamantina, Queensland, Australia
- Tōkō, the former Japanese name for Donggang, Pingtung, Taiwan
- Toko (architecture), a Japanese architectural feature
- Toko-Stanovik, a mountain range in Russia
- Bolshoye Toko (Big Toko), a lake in Russia
- As an abbreviation of Tokomairiro or Tokomairaro, New Zealand:
  - Toko Mouth, a settlement near Milton
  - Tokomairiro High School, Milton
  - Tokomairaro River

== People and fictional characters ==
=== Given name ===
- Toko Fukawa (腐川 冬子), fictional character in Danganronpa
- Tōko Aozaki (蒼崎 橙子), fictional character in Kara no Kyōkai
- Tōko Kirigaya (桐ヶ谷透子), a fictional character in the musical anime and media franchise BanG Dream!
- Touko Machida (待田堂子), Japanese screenwriter
- Tōko Mizuno (水野 十子), Japanese manga artist
- Touko Nanami (七海 燈子), a fictional character from Bloom into You
- Toko Ratana (1894–1944), New Zealand politician
- Toko Shinoda (篠田 桃紅; 1913–2021), Japanese ink painting artist
- Toko Yasuda, Japanese electronic musician

=== Surname ===
- Ayaka Toko (床 亜矢可; born 1994), Japanese ice hockey player
- Esther Toko (born 2000), Nigerian rower
- Haruka Toko (床 秦留可; born 1997), Japanese ice hockey player
- Nambatingue Toko (1952–2026), Chadian footballer
- Nzuzi Toko (born 1990), Cameroonian footballer
- Salwa Toko (born 1975), French diversity and digital literacy activist

== Other ==
- Tōko (game), Japanese version of the East Asian pitch-pot game
- Toko (shop), a shop for Asian products in the Netherlands
- Toko Ski Wax, a brand of Swix
- Toko University, Taiwan

== See also ==
- Togo, country in Africa
- Tokyo, capital of Japan
- Toco, Cochabamba, Bolivia
- Tonko
