= Tondo =

Tondo may refer to:

- Tondo (art), a circular painting or sculpture
- Tondo, Manila, a district of Manila
- Tondo (historical polity), an early historic polity on the north side of the Pasig River delta in Luzon, Philippines; a predecessor of the modern-day district
  - Tondo Conspiracy, a plot against Spanish colonial rule by Tagalog and Kapampangan noblemen in 1587–1588
- Isaac Tondo (born 1981), Liberian footballer
- Xavier Tondó (1978–2011), Spanish professional road racing cyclist

== See also ==
- Tonda (disambiguation)
- Tondi (disambiguation)
- Tonho (name)
- Tonio (name)
- Tonko
