= Forgotten Faces (1928 film) =

1928 film by Victor Schertzinger

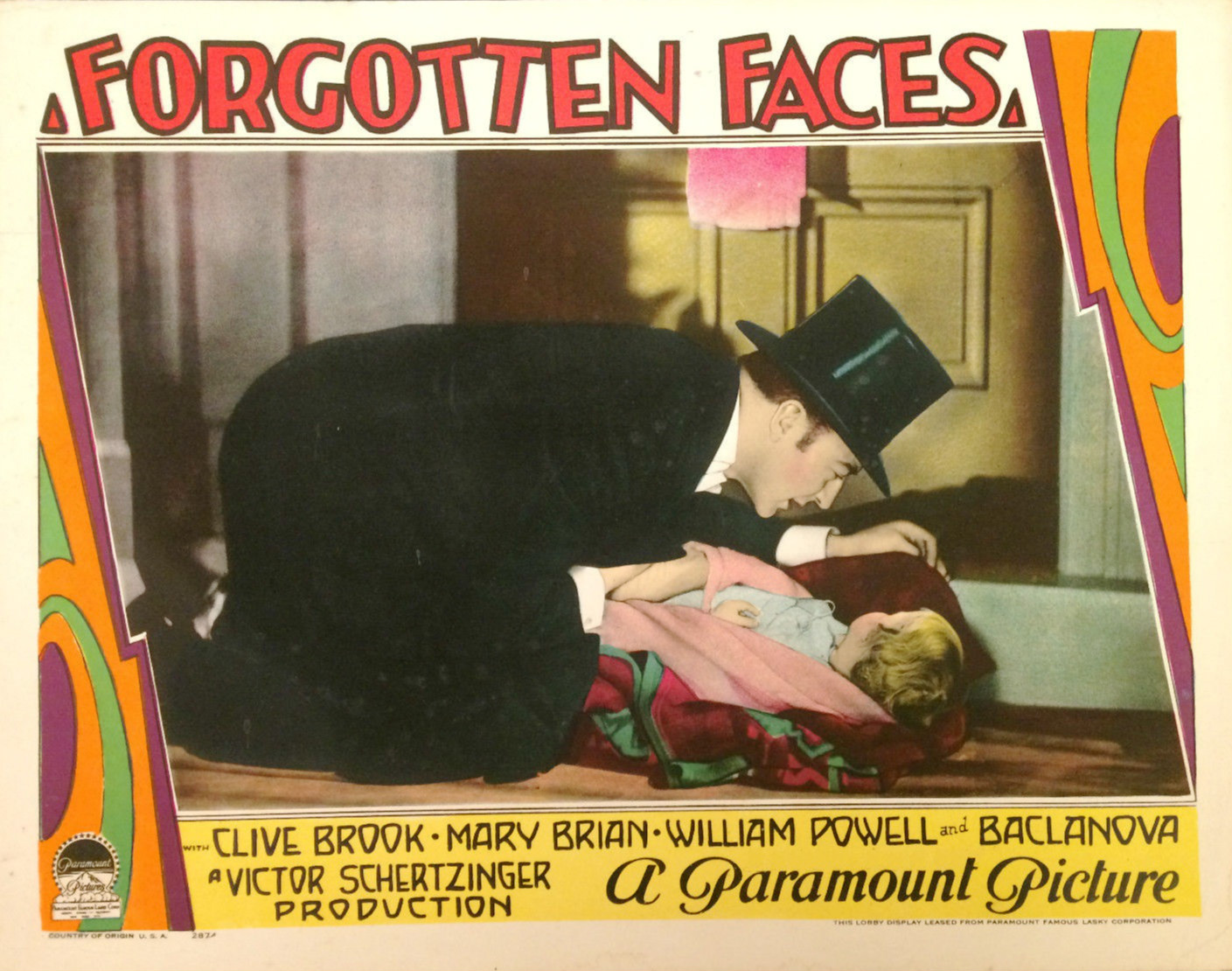
- Lobby card
- Directed by: Victor Schertzinger
- Written by: Howard Estabrook; Oliver H.P. Garrett; Julian Johnson
- Based on: "A Whiff of Heliotrope" by Richard Washburn Child
- Produced by: David O. Selznick
- Starring: Clive Brook; Mary Brian; Olga Baclanova; William Powell
- Cinematography: J. Roy Hunt
- Edited by: George Nichols Jr. David O. Selznick
- Production company: Paramount Pictures
- Distributed by: Paramount Pictures
- Release date: August 5, 1928
- Running time: 80 minutes
- Country: United States
- Language: Silent (English intertitles)

Forgotten Faces is a 1928 American silent drama film directed by Victor Schertzinger and starring Clive Brook, Mary Brian, and Olga Baclanova. The production was overseen by David O. Selznick, a rising young producer at the time. The film was remade by Paramount in 1936 as a sound film.

The film is preserved with copies at the Library of Congress and the Museum of Modern Art.

This film is Paramount's remake of their 1920 film Heliotrope.

== Plot ==
A criminal, “Heliotrope” Harry, comes home after a stick-up job and finds his wife Lilly in bed with another man. He shoots his rival and deposits their baby daughter Alice on a rich couple's doorstep. While serving a life sentence, Harry is updated on his daughter's happy life by his old criminal associate Froggy. For years, his vengeful wife seeks their daughter in vain. When she finally locates their child, the father wrangles parole from a sympathetic warden. He seeks to ensure permanent protection for his daughter by luring his crazed wife into a trap where she shoots him but suffers a prearranged fatal accident while escaping. The father dies in his daughter's arms, who now knows and appreciates his true identity and love for her.

== Cast ==
- Clive Brook as Heliotrope Harry Harlow
- Mary Brian as Alice Deane
- Olga Baclanova as Lilly Harlow
- William Powell as Froggy
- Fred Kohler as Number 1309
- Jack Luden as Tom
- Ernie Adams as Trusty in Hospital (uncredited)
- Symona Boniface as Roulette Player (uncredited)

== Bibliography ==
- Dick, Bernard F. Engulfed: The Death of Paramount Pictures and the Birth of Corporate Hollywood. University Press of Kentucky, 2001.
