= Tōto =

Tōto, Touto or Tohto (とうと) may refer to:

- Tohto University (東都大学, Tōto daigaku), a private university in Japan.

== Places ==
- Tōto (東都), the historical name for Edo and Tokyo.
- Tōto (東都), the Japanese historical name for Luoyang.
- Touto (東都, Tōto), the fictional place in Kamen Rider Build.

== See also ==
- Toto (disambiguation)
