= Under the Tonto Rim (1933 film) =

1933 film

- Directed by: Henry Hathaway
- Written by: Jack Cunningham; Gerald Geraghty
- Based on: novel Under the Tonto Rim by Zane Grey
- Produced by: Harold Hurley
- Starring: Stuart Erwin; Verna Hillie; Raymond Hatton
- Distributed by: Paramount Pictures
- Release date: April 7, 1933
- Running time: 63 minutes
- Country: United States
- Language: English

Under the Tonto Rim is a 1933 American pre-Code Western film directed by Henry Hathaway and starring Stuart Erwin and Verna Hillie. The film is a remake of a 1928 silent film starring Richard Arlen and Mary Brian. Both are based on the Zane Grey 1926 novel of the same name, as is a 1947 film. Print held by the Library of Congress.

== Plot ==
A complete failure as a ranch cowhand and then a chuckwagon driver, Tonto Daley's embarrassment is total after accidentally causing a wagon to tip over and his boss's daughter Nina Weston to fall into a creek.

Tonto hits the trail with his tail between his legs, taking a job from Porky and Tom to become a hog farmer. He is miserable and lonely, and things get worse when former foreman Munther tries to railroad Tonto in the rustling of some cattle. He finds out Porky and Tom are in on it, and Nina becomes Tonto's ally in the fight to make things right.

== Cast ==
- Stuart Erwin as Tonto Daley
- Fred Kohler as Munther
- Raymond Hatton as Porky
- Verna Hillie as Nina Weston
- John Lodge as Joe Gilbert
- George Barbier as Weston

== See also ==
- List of American films of 1933
