= Tonho (name) =

Tonho is a Portuguese (Brazilian Portuguese) masculine nickname and given name that is a diminutive form of Antônio and António used in Brazil. Notable people with this name include the following.

== Nickname ==
- Antônio dos Santos Nascimento, known as Tonho, (born 1938), Brazilian footballer
- Antônio José Gil known as Tonho Gil (born 1957), Brazilian footballer

== Middle name ==
- Pedro Maria Tonha Pedalé, Angolan politician

== See also ==
- Toho (disambiguation)
- Tondo (disambiguation)
- Tongo (disambiguation)
- Tonio (name)
- Tonko
- Tono (name)
- Tonto (disambiguation)
