= Toso (surname) =

Family name

Toso is a surname from Northern Italy, mainly Genoa and Veneto

Notable people with the surname include:

- Ana Maria Toso, Italian paralympic athlete
- Dino Toso, Italian-Dutch motorsport engineer
- Giacinta Toso, Italian opera singer
- Giovanni Pietro dal Toso, secretary of the Pontifical Council “Cor unum”
- Leanne del Toso, paralympic wheelchair basketball player
- Luca Toso, Italian athletics competitor
- Mario Toso, Italian titular bishop
- Otello Toso, Italian film and stage actor

== Aristocracy ==
- Gerolamo De Franchi Toso (1522 –1586), 73rd Doge of the Republic of Genoa.
- Federico De Franchi Toso (1560 –1630) 96th Doge of the Republic of Genoa.
- Giacomo De Franchi Toso (1590 –1657) 109th Doge of the Republic of Genoa
- Gerolamo De Franchi Toso (1585 –1668) 111th Doge of the Republic of Genoa
- Federico De Franchi Toso (1642 -1734) 136rd Doge of the Republic of Genoa
- Cesare De Franchi Toso (1666 –1739) 146rd Doge of the Republic of Genoa

== Other ==
- Barovier & Toso, Italian Venetian glass company that is one of the oldest in world

== See also ==
- Tono (name)
