= Under the Tonto Rim (1947 film) =

1947 film by Lew Landers

- Theatrical release poster
- Directed by: Lew Landers
- Screenplay by: Norman Houston
- Based on: Under the Tonto Rim by Zane Grey
- Produced by: Herman Schlom
- Starring: Tim Holt; Nan Leslie; Richard Martin
- Cinematography: J. Roy Hunt
- Edited by: Lyle Boyer
- Music by: Paul Sawtell
- Production company: RKO Radio Pictures
- Distributed by: RKO Radio Pictures
- Release date: August 1, 1947 (US)
- Running time: 61 minutes
- Country: United States
- Language: English

Under the Tonto Rim is a 1947 American Western film directed by Lew Landers and starring Tim Holt, Nan Leslie, and Richard Martin. Written by Norman Houston and based on the 1926 novel Under the Tonto Rim by Zane Grey, the film is about a gang of outlaws who rob a stagecoach and kill one of the drivers. The stagecoach owner goes undercover to learn the identities and location of the gang leaders. The novel had been adapted to film twice before, in 1928 and 1933, under the same title.

== Plot ==
A cowboy goes undercover to get the gang who killed his driver.

== Cast ==
- Tim Holt as Brad Canfield
- Nan Leslie as Lucy Dennison
- Richard Martin as Chito Rafferty
- Richard Powers as Dennison
- Carol Forman as Juanita
- Tony Barrett as Roy Patton
- Harry Harvey as Sheriff
- Robert Clarke as Hooker
- Jay Norris as Andy
- Lex Barker as Joe, deputy
- Steve Savage as Curly
- Richard Foote as Henry, deputy

== Production ==
In the film, Tim Holt's character smokes a cigarette and has a drink, which was unusual for cowboy stars at the time.

== External list ==
- Under the Tonto Rim at IMDb
- Under the Tonto Rim at the TCM Movie Database (archived version)
- Review of film at Variety
