= Tangos, Navotas =

Barangay Tangos
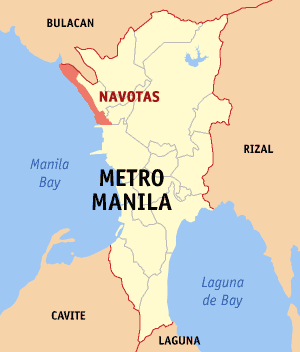
- Map of Metro Manila showing the location of Navotas
- Country: Philippines
- Region: National Capital Region
- City: Navotas
- Congressional districts: Part of the Navotas Congressional District

Government
  - Barangay chairman: Armando Roque

Population (2007)
  - Total: 33,211

Tangos was a barangay (or district) of Navotas in the Philippines until 2013. It was divided to Tangos North, Navotas and Tangos South, Navotas on 2013.
