= Tango (Balanchine) =

Tango is a ballet made by New York City Ballet co-founder and founding choreographer George Balanchine to Stravinsky's Tango (1940) arranged 1953 by the composer. The premiere took place June 10, 1982, as part of City Ballet's Stravinsky Centennial Celebration at the New York State Theater, Lincoln Center.

== Original cast ==
- Karin von Aroldingen
- Christopher d'Amboise

== Reviews ==
- June 11th, 1982 Anna Kisselgoff, NY Times

== Articles ==
- O'Connor, John J. (February 13, 1984). "PETER MARTINS PRESENTS 4 DANCES TO STRAVINSKY". The New York Times.
