= Togo (disambiguation) =

Togo is a country in West Africa.

Togo may also refer to:

== Locations ==
=== Japan ===
- Tōgō, Aichi, a town in Aichi Prefecture
- Tōgō, Kagoshima, a dissolved municipality of Kagoshima Prefecture
- Tōgō, Miyazaki, a town in Miyazaki Prefecture
- Tōgō, Tottori, a town in Tottori Prefecture
- Lake Tōgō, Tottori Prefecture

=== Other ===
- Togo, Saskatchewan, a small village in Canada
- Togoville, a town formerly known as Togo, in the southern part of Togo
- Togo Mountains, Togo
- Lake Togo, the largest part of a lagoon in Togo
- Togo, Kansas, United States, a ghost town
- Togo, Minnesota, United States, an unincorporated community
- Togo, Texas, United States, an unincorporated community

== People ==
- Tōgō Heihachirō (東郷 平八郎; 1848–1934), Japanese admiral
- Tōgō Masamichi (東郷正路; 1852–1906), Japanese admiral
- Togo Murano (村野 藤吾; 1891–1984), Japanese architect
- Seiji Togo (東郷 青児; 1897–1978), Japanese painter and artist
- Shigenori Togo (東郷 茂徳; 1882–1950), Foreign Minister of Japan
- Togo Yamamoto (山本 冬郷; 1886–1952), Japanese actor
- Jonathan Togo (born 1977), American actor
- Togo Mizrahi (1901–1986), Egyptian director, actor, producer, and screenwriter
- Togo Palazzi (1932–2022), American retired National Basketball Association player
- Togo D. West Jr. (1942–2018), African-American lawyer and Secretary of Veterans Affairs
- Togo (comedian), stage name of Filipino entertainer Andres Solomon (1905–1952)
- Togo Igawa, stage name of Japanese actor Yoshiyuki Baba (born 1946)
- Dick Togo (ディック 東郷), ring name of Japanese professional wrestler Shigeki Sato (born 1969)

== Transportation ==
- Air Togo, an airline headquartered in Togo which operated between 1998 and 2000
- Togo station, a train station in Fukuoka prefecture
- Togo station (Saskatchewan), Canada
- Tōgō Station, Munakata, Fukuoka, Japan

== Other uses ==
- Togo (film), a 2019 American film
- Duke Togo (デューク・東郷), the main character of Japanese manga Golgo 13
- Togo (dog) (1913–1929), a famous sled dog
- TOGO, a Japanese builder of roller coasters
- German minelayer V 5908 Togo
- German night fighter direction vessel Togo
- Togo's, an American fast-food chain
- Agasaki Togo (東郷 阿賀崎), a main character and protagonist of anime series Red Ranger Becomes an Adventurer in Another World
- Mimori Togo (東郷 美森), a character of anime series Yuki Yuna Is a Hero
- Rikuya Togo (東郷 リクヤ), a character of anime series Little Battlers Experience WARS
- Hifumi Togo (東郷 一二三), a character of game Persona 5

== See also ==
- Tōgō Shrine, Tokyo
- Take-out
