= Tango (Stravinsky) =

Piano piece by Igor Stravinsky

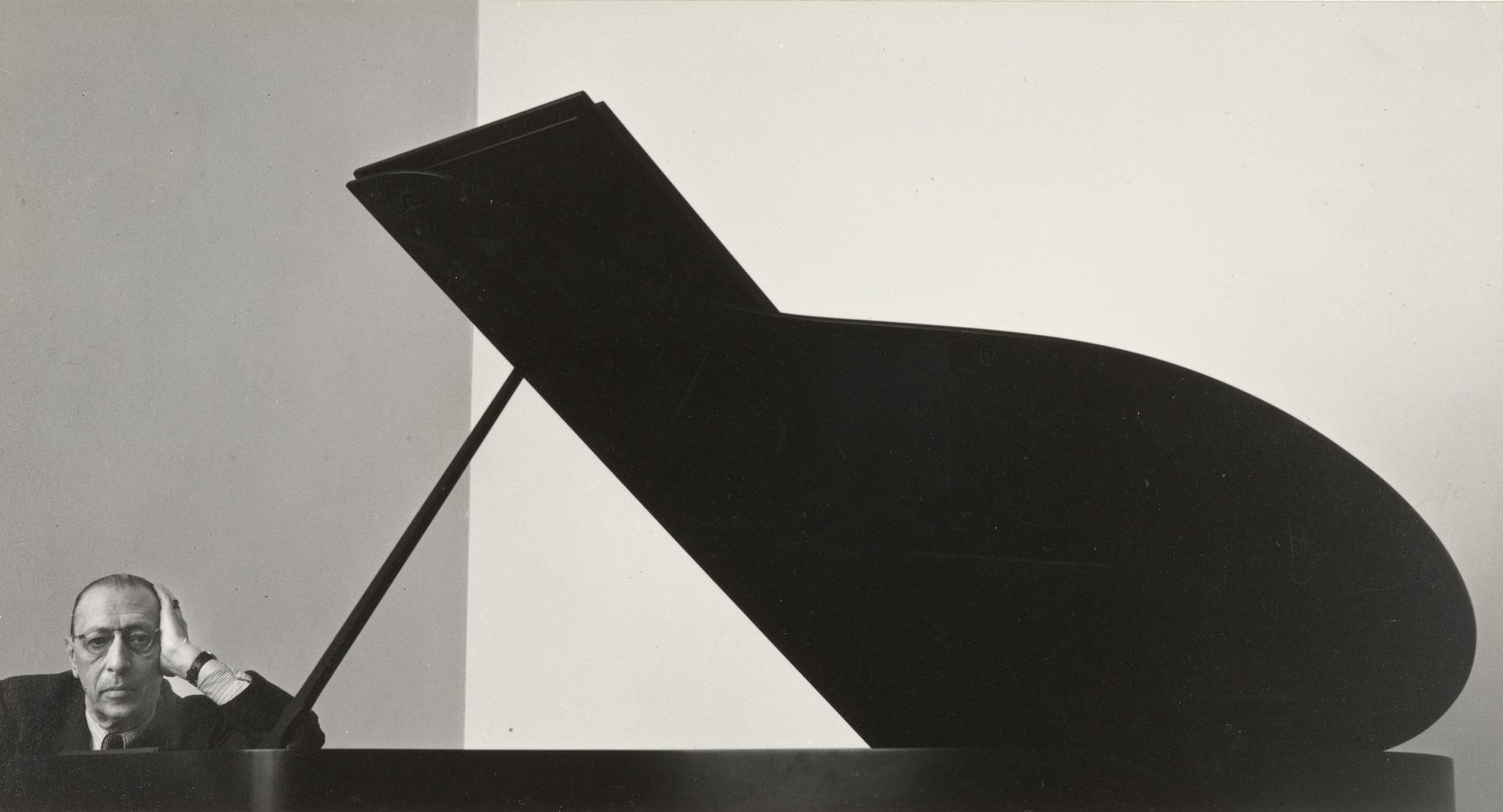
Photograph of Stravinsky by Arnold Newman

Tango is a 1940 piece originally composed for piano by Russian composer Igor Stravinsky. It is one of Stravinsky's most recorded works for piano.

== Composition ==
After settling in Hollywood, Stravinsky was unable to bring the money he earned from his royalties of his works in Europe to America, due to copyright issues and ambiguities. When he found himself with financial difficulties, he decided to write new compositions entirely in America in order to exploit them, with the exclusive intention of making money. Tango, which was the first work entirely written in America, is one of those works.

== Analysis ==
One of the most rhythmically regular works by Stravinsky, the Tango consists of 4/4 bars in four-bar phrase structures. However, this Tango does not follow the rhythmic logic used in Argentinian Tangos: syncopation is almost never used on the last beat of every bar, but it is used on the second instead. This provides the work with a distinctive atmosphere. Unlike some of Stravinsky's post-European works, the Tango is a tonal work. It is in the key of D minor, and modulates to D major in the central trio-like section.

== Arrangements ==
Stravinsky's Tango has been rewritten and rearranged many times either by Stravinsky himself, by fellow musicians or by other musicians, especially after his death. Here is a list of arrangements in which Stravinsky took part:

- The first arrangement was a 1941 orchestra version for three flutes, three clarinets, two oboes, two bassoons, three saxophones, two horns, three trumpets, three trombones, one tuba, percussion, piano, guitar, violins, violas, cellos and double basses. Even though it was purportedly written by Felix Guenther, it was eventually revised and approved by Stravinsky. It was premiered by Benny Goodman in July 1941.
- The second arrangement was composed in 1953 for a very atypical ensemble: four clarinets, one bass clarinet, four trumpets, three trombones, one guitar, three violins, one viola, one cello, and one double bass. It was premiered on October 18, 1953, by fellow musician Robert Craft.
- The third arrangement was written for violin and piano by American violinist Samuel Dushkin, as Stravinsky and Dushkin started performing at recitals together quite often after Stravinsky fled from Europe.

== See also ==
- Tango (Balanchine)
- Tango (Martins)
