= Under the Tonto Rim (1928 film) =

1928 film directed by Herman C. Raymaker

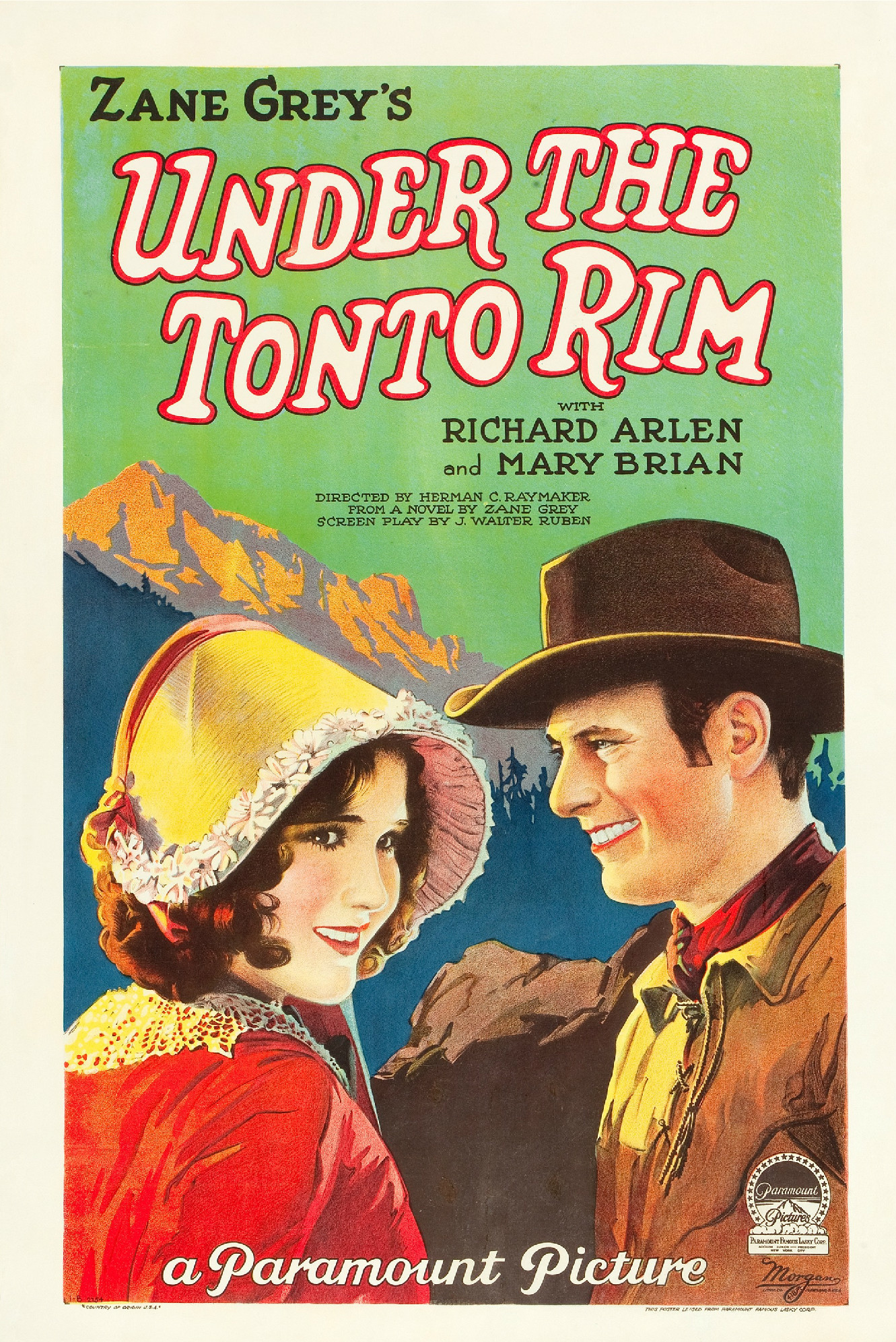
- Lobby poster
- Directed by: Herman C. Raymaker
- Written by: J. Walter Ruben; Alfred Hustwick (titles)
- Based on: Under the Tonto Rim by Zane Grey
- Produced by: Adolph Zukor; Jesse Lasky; B. P. Schulberg
- Starring: Richard Arlen; Mary Brian
- Cinematography: Charles Edgar Schoenbaum
- Edited by: William Shea
- Distributed by: Paramount Pictures
- Release date: February 4, 1928
- Running time: 6 reels
- Country: United States
- Languages: Silent; English intertitles

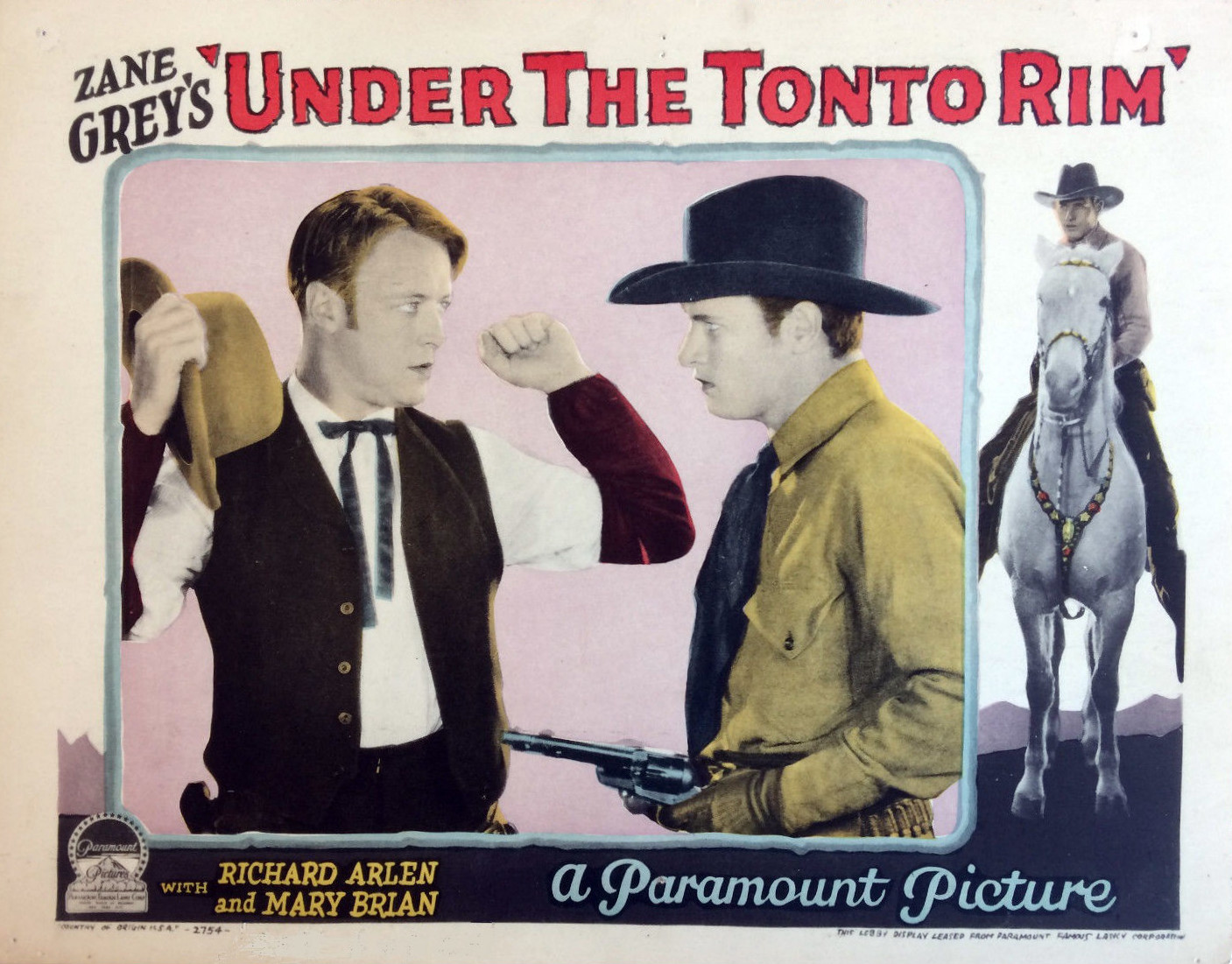
lobby card.

Under the Tonto Rim is a lost 1928 American silent Western film directed by Herman C. Raymaker and starring Richard Arlen and Mary Brian. It is based on the 1926 novel by Zane Grey and was remade in 1933 and 1947.

== Cast ==
- Richard Arlen as Edd Denmeade
- Mary Brian as Lucy Watson
- Alfred Allen as Dad Denmeade
- Jack Luden as Bud Watson
- Harry T. Morey as Sam Spralls
- Billy Franey as 'One Punch' (credited as William Franey)
- Harry Todd as Bert
- Bruce Gordon as Killer Higgins
- Jack Byron as Middleton

== Production ==
Under the Tonto Rim was filmed on location at Bishop, California.
