= Totoma, California =

Human settlement in Butte County, California

Totoma (also, To-to and Totu) is a former Maidu settlement in Butte County, California, United States. It was located on the eastern side of the north branch of Feather River, about midway between Yankee and Hengy; its precise location is unknown.
