= Mary Brian =

American actress (1906–2002)

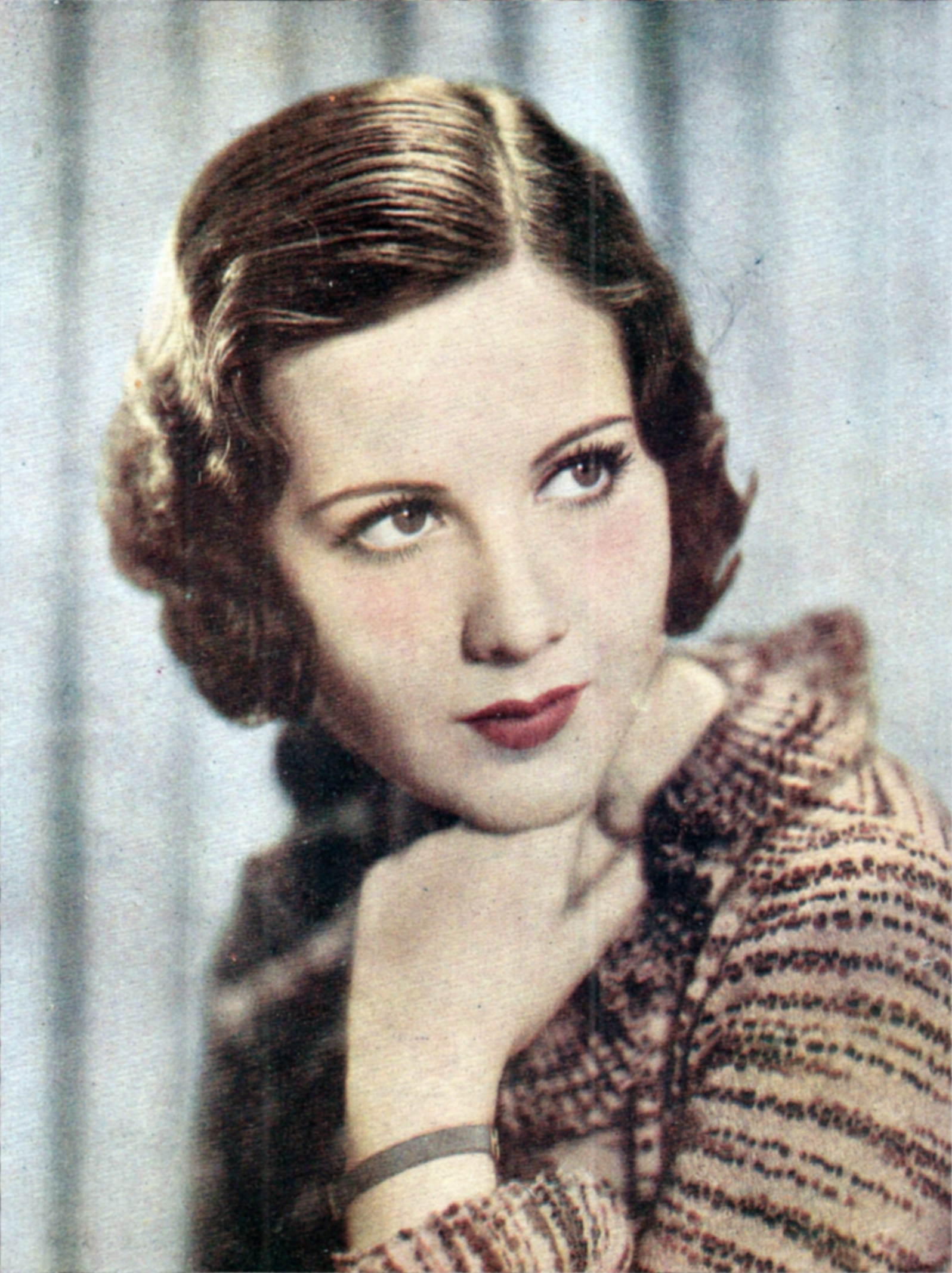
- Brian in 1931
- Born: Louise Byrdie Dantzler; February 17, 1906; Corsicana, Texas, U.S.
- Died: December 30, 2002 (aged 96); Del Mar, California, U.S.
- Occupation: Actress
- Years active: 1924–1954
- Spouses: Jon Whitcomb (m. 1941; div. 1941) George Tomasini (m. 1947; died 1964)

Mary Brian (born Louise Byrdie Dantzler, February 17, 1906 – December 30, 2002) was an American actress who made the transition from silent films to sound films.

== Early life ==
Brian was born in Corsicana, Texas, the daughter of Taurrence J. Dantzler and Louise B. Her brother was Taurrence J. Dantzler, Jr.

Her father died when she was one month old and the family later moved to Dallas, Texas. In the early 1920s, they moved to Long Beach, California. She had intended to become an illustrator, but that was laid aside when, at age 16, she was discovered in a local bathing-beauty contest. One of the judges was actress Esther Ralston (who was to play her mother in the upcoming Peter Pan and who became a lifelong friend).

She did not win the $25 prize in the contest, but Ralston said, "you've got to give the little girl something". So, her prize was to be interviewed by director Herbert Brenon for a role in Peter Pan. Brenon was recovering from eye surgery, and she spoke with him in a dimly lit room. "He asked me a few questions, Is that your hair? Out of the blue, he said, 'I would like to make a test.' Even to this day, I will never know why I was that lucky. They had made tests of every ingénue in the business for Wendy. He had decided he would go with an unknown. It would seem more like a fairy tale. It wouldn't seem right if the roles were to be taken by someone they (the audience) knew or was divorced. I got the part. They put me under contract." The studio renamed her Mary Brian.

== Discovery ==
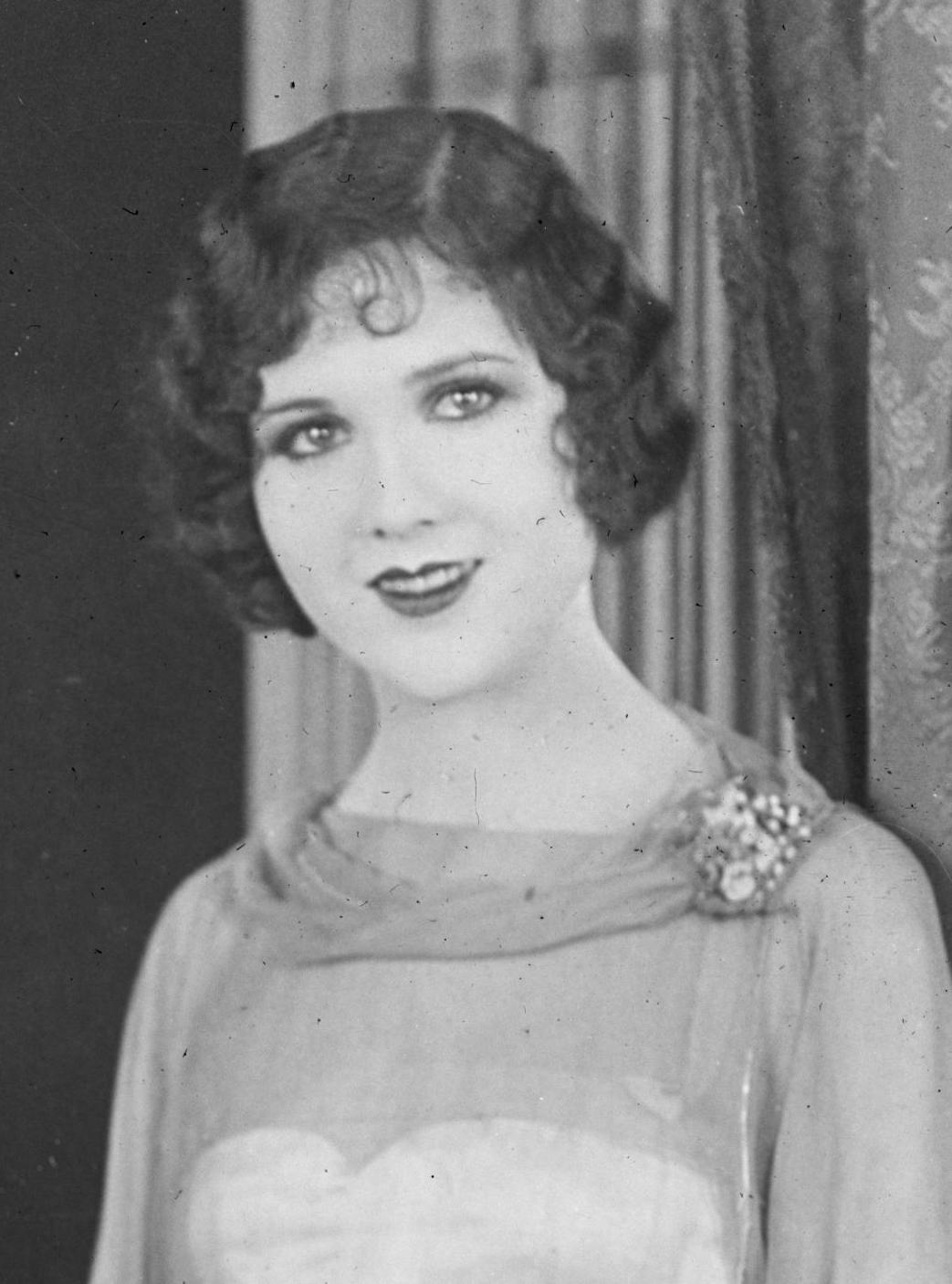
Mary Brian in the early 1920s

After her showing in the beauty contest, she was given an audition by Paramount Pictures and cast by director Herbert Brenon as Wendy Darling in his silent movie version of J.M. Barrie's Peter Pan (1924). There, she starred with Betty Bronson and Esther Ralston, and the three of them stayed close for the rest of their lives. Ralston described both Bronson and Brian as "very charming people".

The movie studio, which created her stage name for the movie and said she was age 16 instead of 18 because the latter sounded too old for the role, then signed her to a long-term contract. Brian played Fancy Vanhern, daughter of Percy Marmont, in Brenon's The Street of Forgotten Men (1925), which had newcomer Louise Brooks in an uncredited role as a moll.

== Career rise ==
Brian was dubbed "The Sweetest Girl in Pictures." On loan-out to MGM, she played a college belle, Mary Abbott, opposite William Haines and Jack Pickford in Brown of Harvard (1926). She was named one of the WAMPAS Baby Stars in 1926, along with Mary Astor, Dolores Costello, Joan Crawford, Dolores del Río, Janet Gaynor, and Fay Wray.

During her years at Paramount, Brian appeared in more than 40 movies as the lead, the ingenue, or co-star. She worked with Brenon again in 1926, when she played Isabel in P.C. Wren's Beau Geste starring Ronald Colman. The same year, she made Behind the Front and Harold Teen. In 1928, she played ingenue Alice Deane in Forgotten Faces opposite Clive Brook, her sacrificing father, with Olga Baclanova as her vixen mother and William Powell as Froggy. Forgotten Faces is preserved in the Library of Congress.

== Successful transition to sound films ==
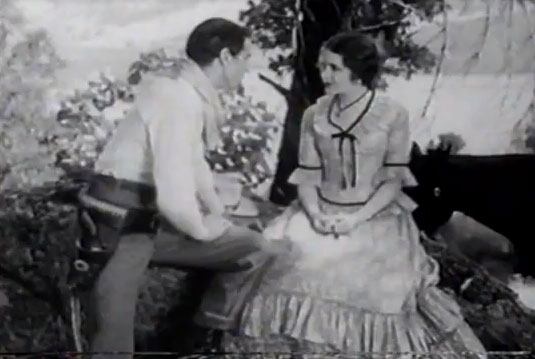
Mary Brian with Gary Cooper in The Virginian (1929)

Her first sound film was Varsity (1928), which was filmed with part-sound and talking sequences, opposite Buddy Rogers. After successfully making the transition to sound, she co-starred with Gary Cooper, Walter Huston, and Richard Arlen in The Virginian (1929), her first all-sound movie. In it, she played a spirited frontier heroine, schoolmarm Molly Stark Wood, who was the Virginian's (Cooper) love interest.

Brian co-starred in several hits during the 1930s, including her role as Gwen Cavendish in George Cukor’s comedy The Royal Family of Broadway (1930) with Ina Claire and Fredric March, as herself in Paramount's all-star revue Paramount on Parade (1930), and as Peggy Grant in Lewis Milestone’s comedy The Front Page (1931) with Adolphe Menjou and Pat O'Brien.

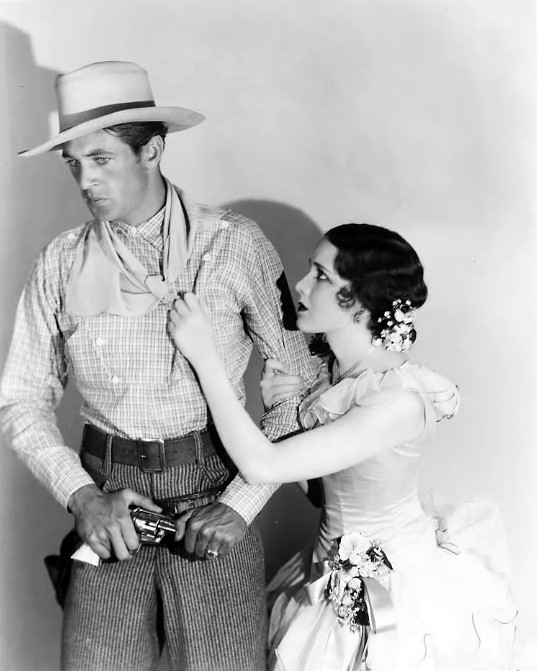
Gary Cooper and Mary Brian in a film still for The Virginian, 1929

After her contract with Paramount ended in 1932, Brian decided to freelance, which was unusual in a period when multiyear contracts with one studio were common. The same year, she appeared on the vaudeville stage at New York City's Palace Theatre. Also in the same year, she starred in Manhattan Tower.

Her other movie roles include Murial Ross (Murial Rossi) in Shadows of Sing Sing (1933), in which she received top billing; Gloria Van Dayham in College Rhythm (1934); Yvette Lamartine in Charlie Chan in Paris (1935); Hope Wolfinger, W.C. Fields’s daughter, in Man on the Flying Trapeze (1935); Sally Barnaby in Spendthrift (1936); and Doris in Navy Blues (1937), in which she received top billing.

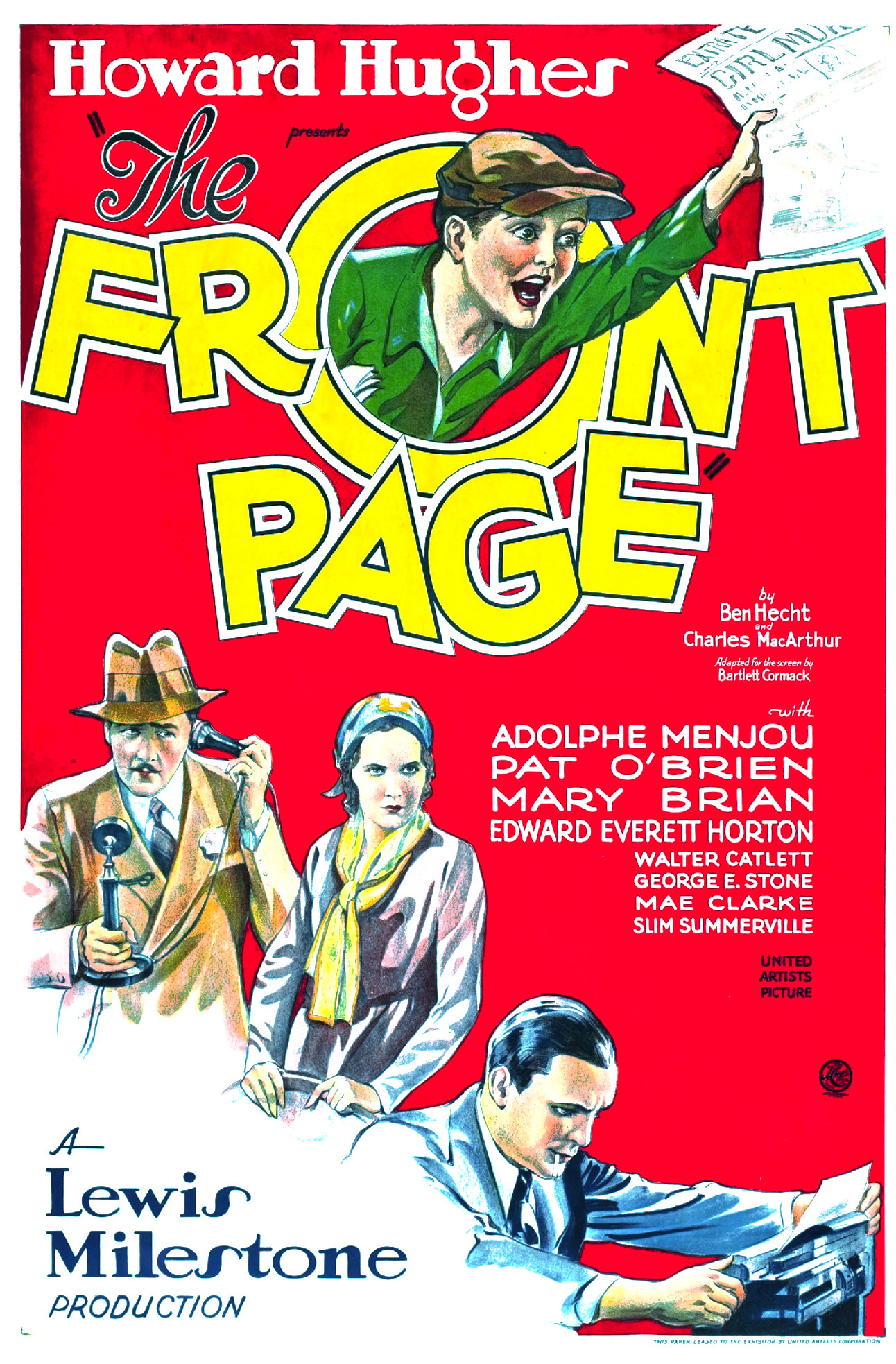
Poster from The Front Page in 1931

In 1936, she went to England and made three movies, including The Amazing Quest of Ernest Bliss, in which she starred opposite Cary Grant, to whom she became engaged for a time.

Her final film of the 1930s was Affairs of Cappy Ricks, although she auditioned for the part that ultimately went to Janet Gaynor in A Star is Born.

== Later career ==
When World War II began in 1941, Brian began traveling to entertain the troops, spending most of the war years traveling the world with the U.S.O., and entertaining servicemen from the South Pacific to Europe, from Italy to North Africa. Commenting on those events, she said in 1996,

I was with Charlie Ruggles in Okinawa. And I was on the island of Tinian when they dropped the atomic bomb. Colonel Paul Tibbets, who was the pilot and the officer in charge [of dropping the bomb] took Charlie and me on the plane the next day, and nobody had been allowed in that encampment. So, I was on the Enola Gay.

Flying to England on a troop shoot, Brian was caught in the Battle of the Bulge and spent the Christmas of 1944 with the soldiers engaged in that battle.

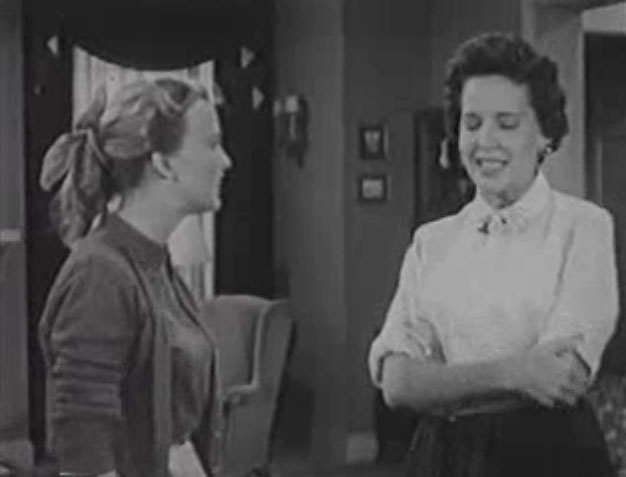
Mary Brian with Ann Baker in Meet Corliss Archer

She appeared in only a handful of films thereafter. Her last performance in movies was in Dragnet (1947). Over the course of 22 years, Brian had appeared in more than 79 movies.

She played in the stage comedy Mary Had a Little... in 1951 in Melbourne, Australia, co-starring with John Hubbard.

Like many "older" actresses, during the 1950s, Brian created a career in television. Perhaps her most notable role was playing the title character's mother in Meet Corliss Archer in 1954.

She also dedicated much time to portrait painting after her acting years.

== Personal life and death ==
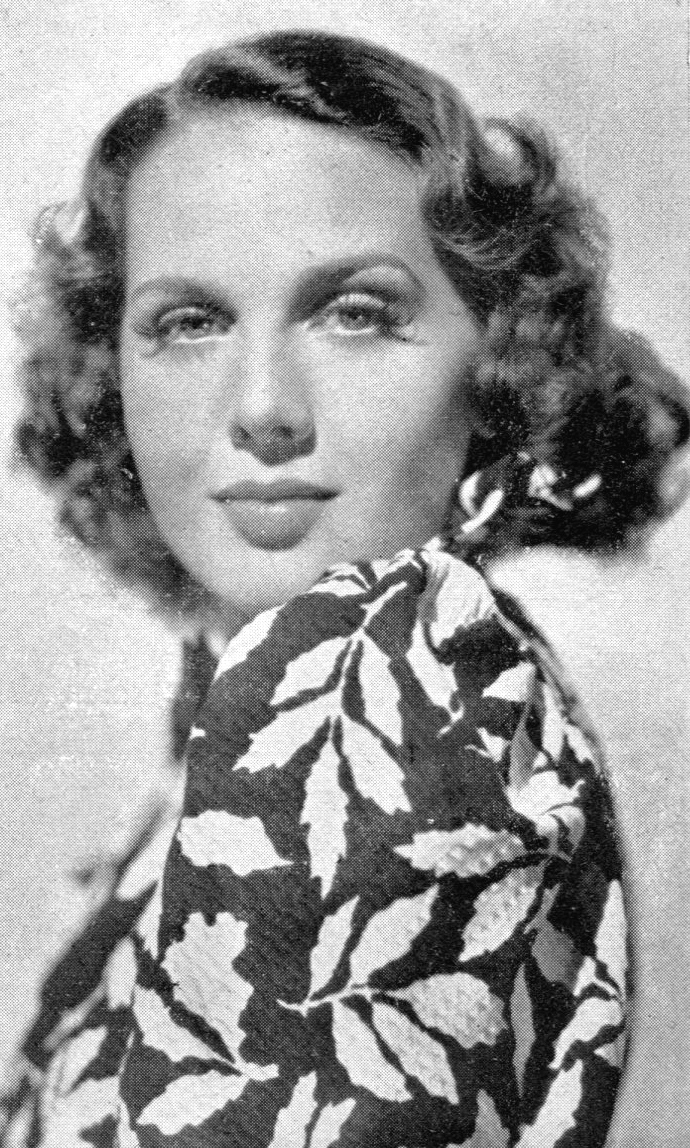
Brian in 1936

Although she was engaged numerous times, and was linked romantically to numerous Hollywood men, including Cary Grant and silent film actor Jack Pickford, Brian had only two husbands: magazine illustrator Jon Whitcomb (for six weeks, beginning May 4, 1941) and film editor George Tomasini (from 1947 until his death in 1964). After retiring from movies for good, she devoted herself to her husband's career; Tomasini worked as a film editor for Alfred Hitchcock on Rear Window (1954) and Psycho (1960).

She died of natural causes on December 30, 2002, at a retirement home in Del Mar, California at the age of 96.

== Legacy ==
In 1960, Brian was inducted into the Hollywood Walk of Fame with a motion pictures star at 1559 Vine Street.

== Selected filmography ==
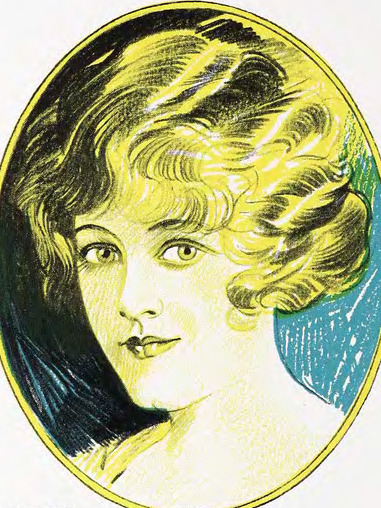
- Mary Brian 1925 art
  Peter Pan (1924) as Wendy Moira Angela Darling
- The Little French Girl (1925) as Alix Vervier
- The Air Mail (1925) as Minnie Wade
- The Street of Forgotten Men (1925) as Mary Vanhern
- A Regular Fellow (1925) as Girl
- The Enchanted Hill (1926) as Hallie Purdy
- Behind the Front (1926) as Betty Bartlett-Cooper
- Paris at Midnight (1926) as Victorine Tallefer
- Brown of Harvard (1926) as Mary Abbott
- More Pay - Less Work (1926) as Betty Ricks
- Beau Geste (1926) as Isabel Rivers
- Prince of Tempters (1926) as Mary
- Battling Butler (1926)
- Stepping Along (1926) as Molly Taylor
- Her Father Said No (1927) as Charlotte Hamilton
- High Hat (1927) as Millie
- Knockout Reilly (1927) as Mary Malone
- Running Wild (1927) as Elizabeth Finch
- Man Power (1927) as Alice Stoddard
- Shanghai Bound (1927) as Sheila
- Two Flaming Youths (1927) as Mary Gilfoil
- Under the Tonto Rim (1928) as Lucy Watson
- Partners in Crime (1928) as Marie Burke, The Cigarette Girl
- Harold Teen (1928) as Lillums Lovewell
- The Big Killing (1928) as Mary Beagle - Old Man Beagle's Daughter
- Forgotten Faces (1928) as Alice Deane
- Varsity (1928) as Fay
- Someone to Love (1928) as Joan Kendricks
- Black Waters (1929) as Eunice
- The Man I Love (1929) as Celia Fields
- River of Romance (1929) as Lucy Jeffers
- The Virginian (1929) as Molly Stark Wood
- The Marriage Playground (1929) as Judith Wheater
- The Kibitzer (1930) as Josie Lazarus
- Burning Up (1930) as Ruth Morgan
- Only the Brave (1930) as Barbara Calhoun
- The Light of Western Stars (1930) as Ruth Hammond
- Galas de la Paramount (1930) as Sweetheart - Episode 'Dream Girl'
- The Social Lion (1930) as Cynthia Brown
- Only Saps Work (1930) as Barbara Tanner
- The Royal Family of Broadway (1930) as Gwen Cavendish
- Captain Applejack (1931) as Poppy Faire
- The Front Page (1931) as Peggy Grant
- Gun Smoke (1931) as Sue Vancey
- The Homicide Squad (1931) as Millie
- The Runaround (1931) as Evelyn
- Hollywood Halfbacks (1931, short)
- It's Tough to Be Famous (1932) as Janet Porter McClenahan
- Blessed Event (1932) as Gladys Price
- The Unwritten Law (1932) as Ruth Evans
- Manhattan Tower (1932) as Mary Harper
- Hard to Handle (1933) as Ruth Waters
- Girl Missing (1933) as June Dale
- The World Gone Mad (1933) as Diane Cromwell
- Song of the Eagle (1933) as Elsa Kranzmeyer
- Moonlight and Pretzels (1933) as Sally Upton
- One Year Later (1933) as Molly Collins
- Fog (1933) as Mary Fulton
- Shadows of Sing Sing (1933) as Muriel Ross aka Muriel Rossi
- Ever Since Eve (1934) as Elizabeth Vandergrift
- Private Scandal (1934) as Fran Somers
- Monte Carlo Nights (1934) as Mary Vernon
- College Rhythm (1934) as Gloria Van Dayham
- Charlie Chan in Paris (1935) as Yvette Lamartine
- Man on the Flying Trapeze (1935) as Hope Wolfinger
- Once in a Million (1936) as Suzanne
- Two's Company (1936) as Julia Madison
- Spendthrift (1936) as Sally Barnaby
- The Amazing Quest of Ernest Bliss (1936) as Frances Clayton
- Three Married Men (1936) as Jennie Mullins
- Killer at Large (1936) as Linda Allen
- Navy Blues (1937) as Doris Kimbell
- Affairs of Cappy Ricks (1937) as Frances 'Frankie' Ricks
- Calaboose (1943) as Doris Lane
- I Escaped from the Gestapo (1943) as Helen
- Danger! Women at Work (1943) as Pert
- The Captain from Köpenick (1945) as Frau Obermueller, the Mayor's Wife
- Dragnet (1947) as Anne Hogan
