= Tono (singer) =

Japanese actress and singer

Tono (都乃)
- 櫻井 都乃（さくらい さとの）
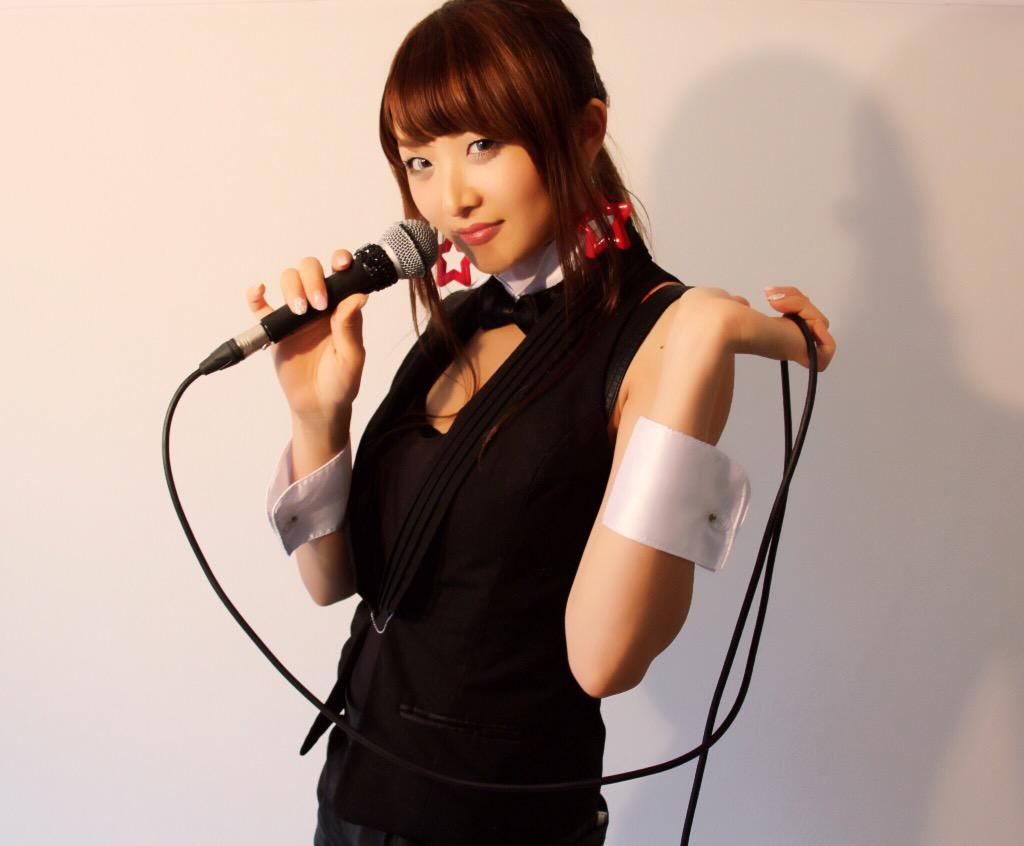
- Born: October 31; Shizuoka, Japan
- Other names: Satono (solo); Tono (Pepesale)
- Occupations: Singer; Actress
- Years active: September 24, 2008–present
- Website: 都乃/Satono Official Blog

Tono (都乃; born October 31) is a Japanese Actor and singer from Shizuoka. She sings in "Pepesale".

== Career ==
On September 24, 2008, Tono made her debut as a member of the chorus unit "M". She sang the melody and low vocal parts.

On May 1, 2010, she left "M" and began her solo career as R&B singer Tono (都乃). On April 1, 2013, she changed her solo career name to Satono. In 2014, she joined Pepsale as Tono (都乃). She writes songs for Pepesale and for herself as Satono.

She served as swing of the Toho musical Rent (2015 Japan version).

She mastered six-stage calligraphy, and was influenced by relatives who do Japanese flower arrangement and Japanese tea ceremonies.

== Works ==
=== Theater ===
- Rent (2015) – (Director: Michael Greif) Swing

=== Concert (Pepesale) ===
- "Cross the Banana Moon" ~ Banana Taisa Arawaru ! ~ Release Party (September 19 (Fri) 2014) Shimokitazawa Mosaic
- "Cross the Banana Moon" ~ Banana Taisa to Angou no Chizu ~ One-man live (November 9 (Sun) 2014) Shimokitazawa Mosaic
- "Sayonara Banana Taisa!" ~ Arigato Bounenkai 2014 ~ (December 27 (Sat) 2014) Nishi Ogikubo w.jaz
- "Kawasaki Street Music Battle!" V Final (March 7 (Sat) 2015) Sanpian Kawasaki
- "Oe Banana Taisa wo!" ~ Pepesale One-man Live ~ (July 11 (Sat) 2015) Takadanobaba CLUB PHASE

=== Radio ===
- Pepesale no Radio Zettai Ryouiki (Smile FM) January 6, 2015–

=== Live streaming ===
- Pepesale no MHKDS Hour (TwitCasting) May 9, 2014 – Every Sunday from 23:00
- Hissatsu ! Pepesale Otoshi (Showroom) April 5, 2015 – Every Sunday from 22:00

== Discography ==
=== Single CD (M) ===
#	Release date	Title
1st	September 24, 2008	Sing a song forever
2nd	June 3, 2009	Bang ! Bang ! Bang
3rd	February 3, 2010	Kirei no Chikara / Tsubasa

* Posted only for the CD when Tono was in the unit

=== Album CD (Pepesale) ===
#	Release date	Title
1st	February 11, 2014	Stelet Parade
2nd	September 19, 2014	Magic Genic
3rd	July 11, 2015	Cobalt Sketcher
