= Tolo =

Tolo may refer to:

== Places ==
=== Hong Kong ===
- Tolo Channel, a sea channel
- Tolo Harbour, a sheltered harbour
- Tolo Highway, an expressway

=== Elsewhere ===
- Tolo, Democratic Republic of the Congo
- Tolo, a place in Norheimsund, Norway
- Tolo, Greece, a village
- Tolo, Guinea, a town
- Gulf of Tolo (Indonesian: Teluk Tolo), a bay in Sulawesi, Indonesia
- Tölö, the Swedish collective name for the neighbourhoods Etu-Töölö (Främre Tölö) and Taka-Töölö (Bortre Tölö) in Helsinki, Finland

== Other uses ==
- Tolo (surname)
- Tolo (dance), a regional U.S. term for a type of school dance where females invite males
- TOLO (TV channel), an Afghan TV station
  - TOLOnews, an Afghan news channel and website
- Tiele people, a Turkic people in inner Asia before the 8th century
- Tolo, an Aztec deity, for which Toluca was named.
- Tolo, a cultivar of Karuka
- Take one, leave one, a term for a public bookcase
