= Tango (Martins) =

Tango is a ballet made by New York City Ballet balletmaster Peter Martins to Stravinsky's Tango (1940) arranged 1953 by the composer. The premiere took place September 14, 1983 at Tivoli Concert Hall, Copenhagen; the NYCB premiere was in February, 1984.

== Original cast ==
- Heather Watts
- Bart Cook

== Reviews ==
- Kisselgoff, Anna (February 6, 1984). "BALLET: 'TANGO,' A MARTINS PREMIERE". The New York Times.
