= Olga Baclanova =

Russian-American actress, radio host, and singer (1893–1974)

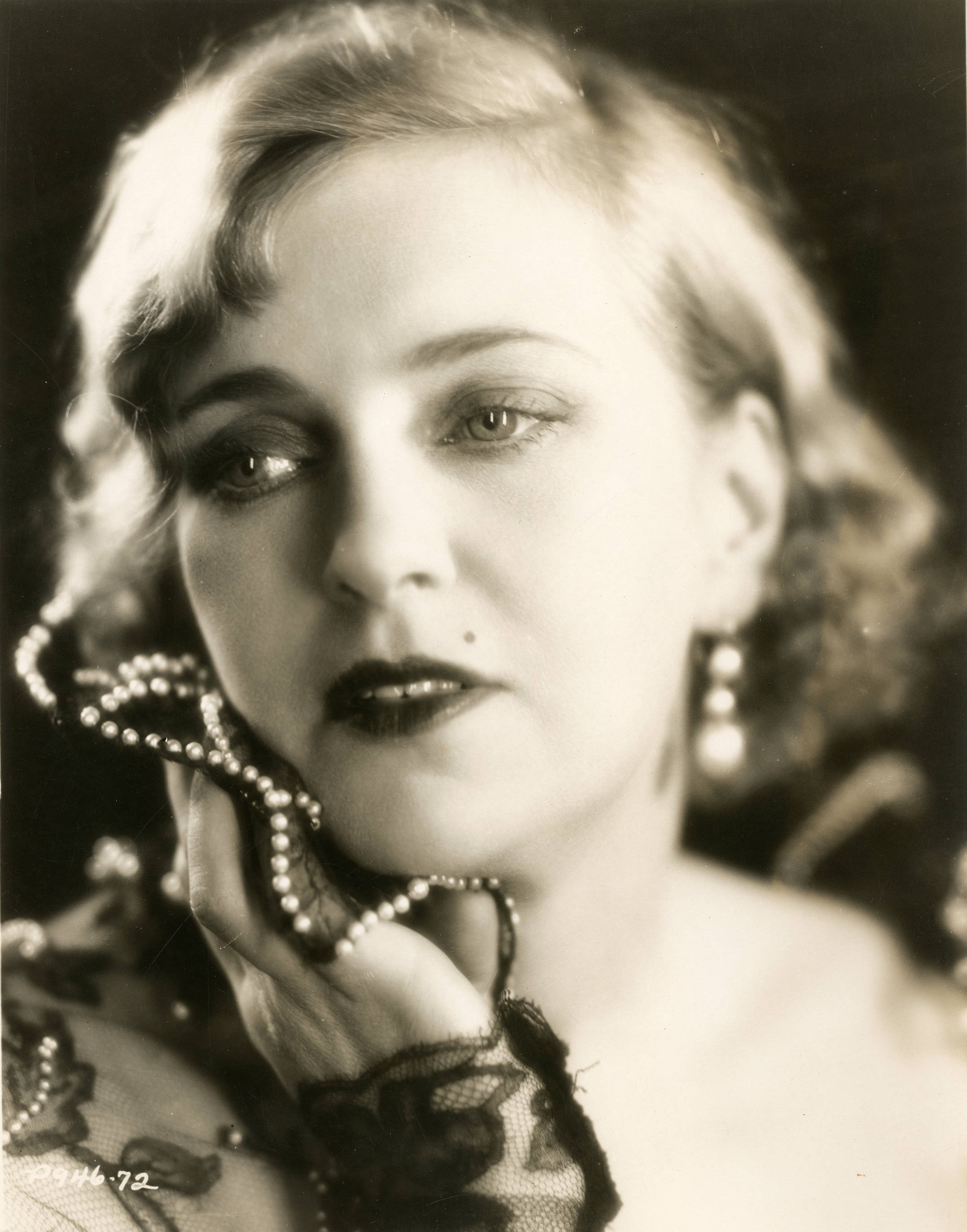
- Baclanova in 1928
- Born: Olga Vladimirovna Baklanova; 19 August 1893; Moscow, Russia
- Died: 6 September 1974 (aged 81); Vevey, Switzerland
- Education: Moscow Art Theatre
- Occupations: Actress; radio host; singer
- Years active: 1914–1925 (Russia); 1925–1953 (U.S.)
- Spouses: Vladimir Zoppi (m. 1922; div. 1929) Nicholas Soussanin (m. 1929; div. 1935) Richard Davis (m. 1937)
- Awards: Merited Artist of the Russian Federation

Olga Vladimirovna Baklanova (Russian: О́льга Влади́мировна Бакла́нова; 19 August [O.S. 7 August] 1892 – 6 September 1974), known professionally as Olga Baclanova, was a Russian-born actress who found success in Hollywood films, as well as stage roles in the US and the United Kingdom, she was mainly billed as an exotic blonde temptress, who was given the title of the "Russian Tigress".

Baclanova, a student of the Moscow Art Theatre spent her early years in her native land appearing in theatre production and silent film from 1914 until 1918, reducing her age by several years and changing the spelling of her surname Baklanova. She was often billed under her surname only, similar to her fellow countrywoman Nazimova.

She emigrated to the United States in 1925, and started appearing on stage and subsequently in Hollywood films, where she was celebrated for the Universal Pictures silent The Man Who Laughs as the evil Duchess Josiana and in Tod Browning's cult-classic horror film Freaks (1932) at MGM, as scheming circus trapeze artist, Cleopatra.

== Early life, Moscow Arts Theatre and Russian career (radio, stage and film) ==
Olga Vladimirovna Baklanova was born on 19 August 1893 (other sources state 1883, 1884, 1896 or even 1900, according to her obituary) in Moscow, Russia. She was the daughter of Vladimir Baklanov and his wife Alexandra, an actress in early Russian films. She had 6 siblings, including later Soviet general and World War II hero Gleb Baklanov. Baclanova studied drama at the Cherniavsky Institute before being accepted into the Moscow Art Theatre with contemporaries such as Maria Ouspenskaya in 1912.

Over the next decade she appeared in Russian films, and also performed extensively on stage, touring and performing in many countries of the world. She was a feature actress of plays by Ibsen, Chekhov and Turgenev, and the M.A.T productions of Shakespeare, Dickins and Berger.

In the 1930s, Baclanova, who had vocal training at the Moscow Arts Theatre, had a program called Olga Baclanova's Continental Review, and she often appeared as a guest on radio programs singing songs in her native Russian, often with the F. Zarkerich Orchestra and also made recordings, including an album titled the "Olga Baclanova Album", released in 1946, by Unique Records

In 1925 she was given the award "Merited Artist of the Republic", the highest Soviet artist honour. Baclanova appeared in around 17 films during her career in Russia.

== American career ==
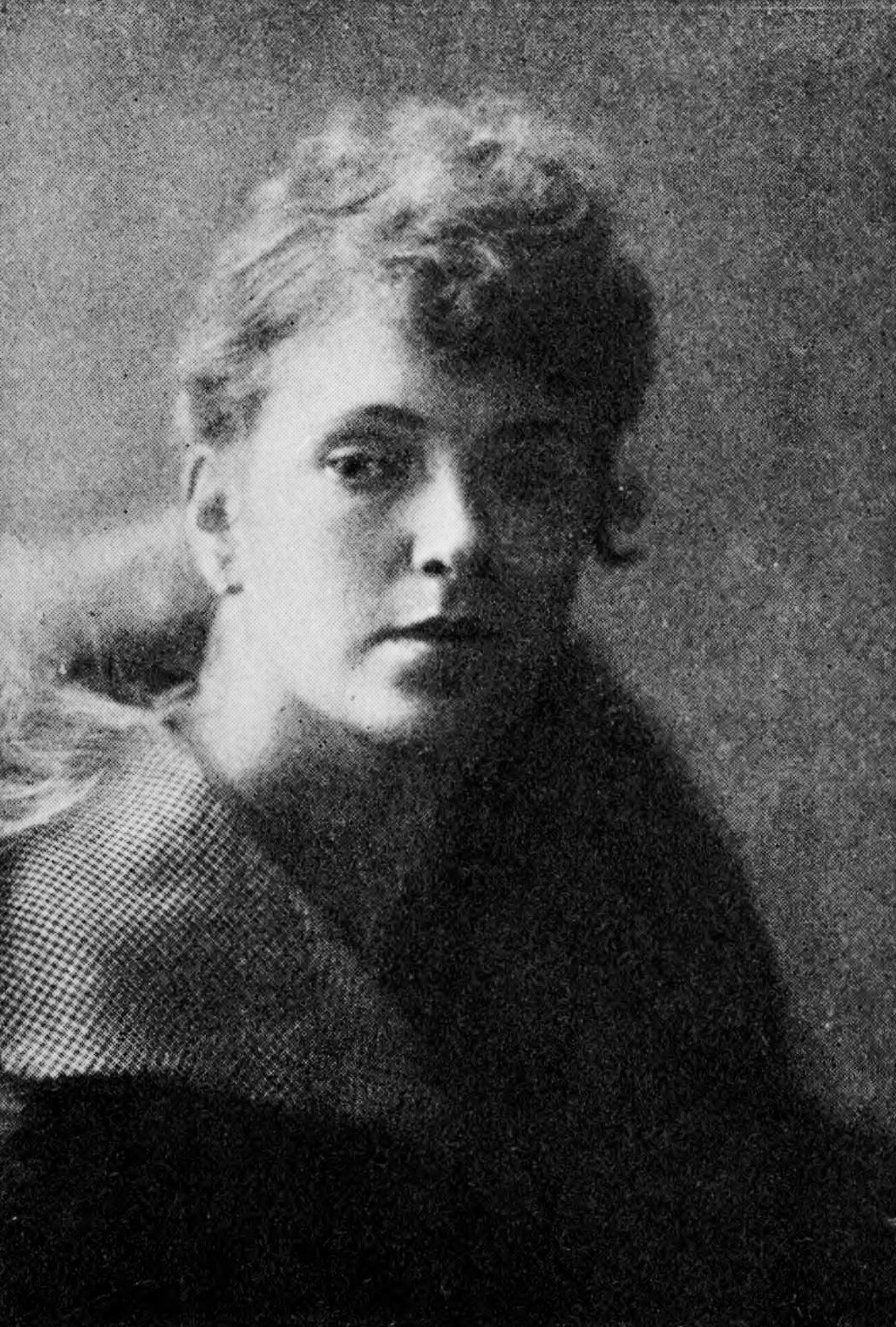
Olga Baclanova (1922)

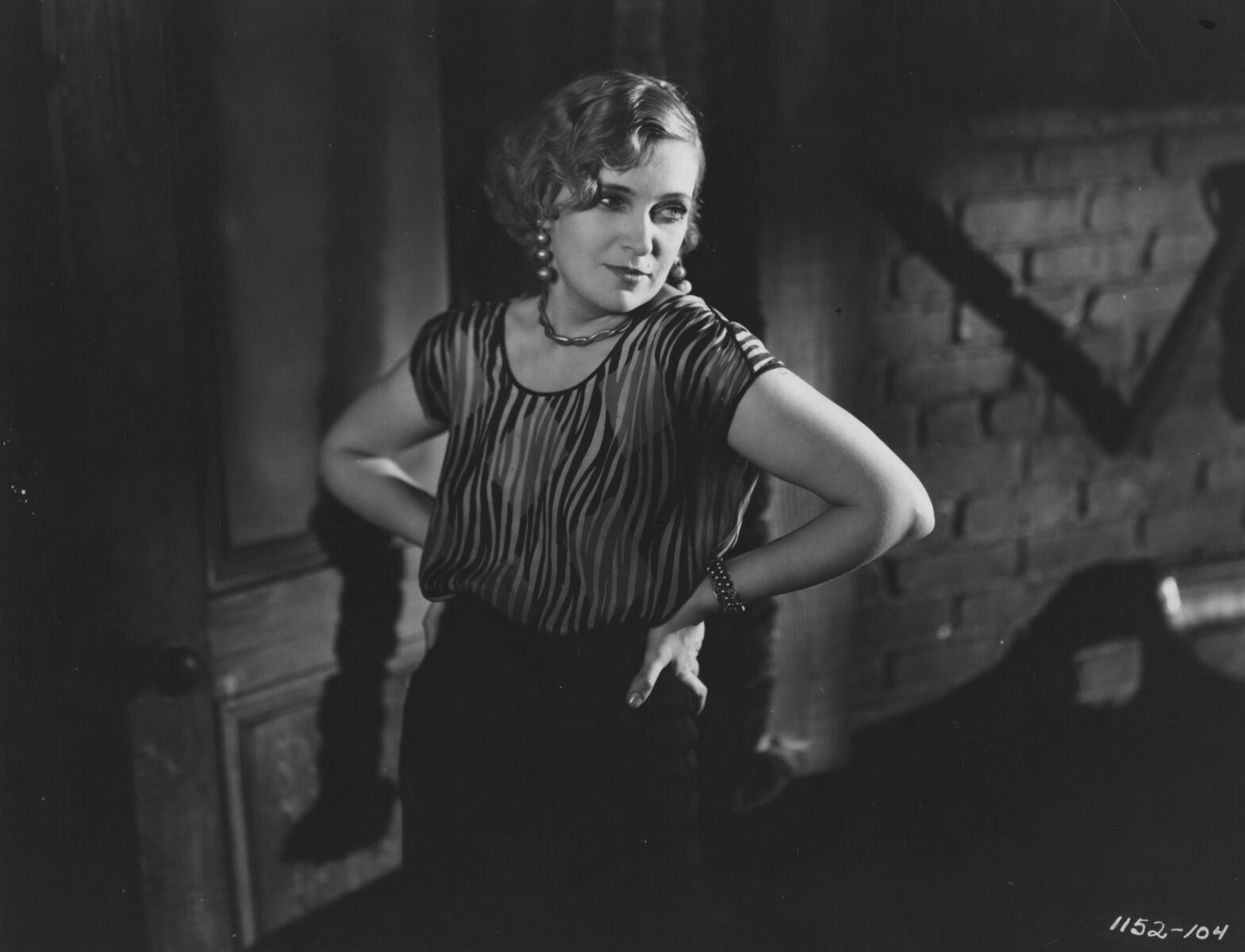
Olga Baclanova as Lou in The Docks of New York (1928)

Baclanova came to New York City with the 1925 touring production of the Moscow Art Theatre's Lysistrata. When the rest of the company returned to Russia the following year, she stayed in America. She appeared in a West Coast production of The Miracle, before being cast in a bit part in her debut film, The Dove in 1927. A statuesque blonde, Baclanova quickly established herself as a popular actress in American silent movies and achieved success with The Docks of New York in 1928, directed by Josef von Sternberg. Later that year, she appeared in The Man Who Laughs as Duchess Josiana, the femme fatale love interest to Conrad Veidt's disfigured hero.

The introduction of talking films proved difficult for Baclanova due to her heavy Russian accent. She no longer secured leading roles, and was relegated to supporting parts. Her career was in decline when she was offered the role of the cruel circus performer Cleopatra in Tod Browning's film Freaks (1932). This horror movie, which featured actual carnival freaks, was highly controversial and screened only briefly before being withdrawn. It would be 30 years before Freaks gained a cult following. The movie did not revive Baclanova's film career, which ended in 1943.

Baclanova worked extensively on stage in London's West End and in New York, for about 10 years starting in the mid-1930s. In 1943 she appeared in Claudia at the Moore Theatre in Seattle, Washington.

== Personal life ==
Baclanova's father died of natural causes in 1922. She was married three times. Her first husband was a lawyer named Vladimir Zoppi with whom she had her first son. Her second husband was actor Nicholas Soussanin with whom she had her second son. The birth of her second son was front-page news and was covered quite extensively in the press in 1930. Her third marriage was to Russian-born David Judovitch, better known as Richard Davis (1900–1984), who owned the Fine Arts Theatre in New York. In 1931, Baclanova became a naturalized American citizen.

== Legacy ==
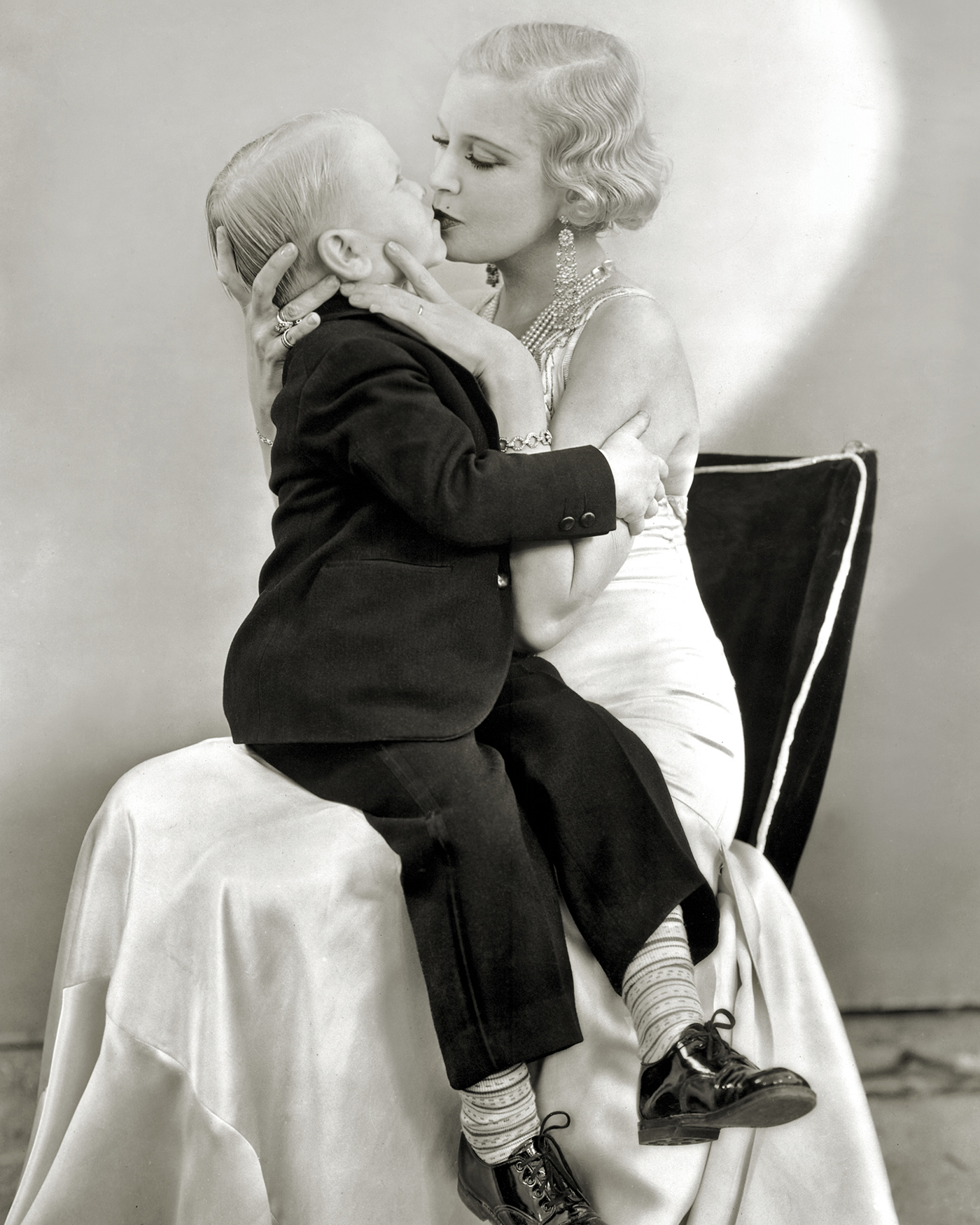
Harry Earles and Baclanova in Freaks (1932)

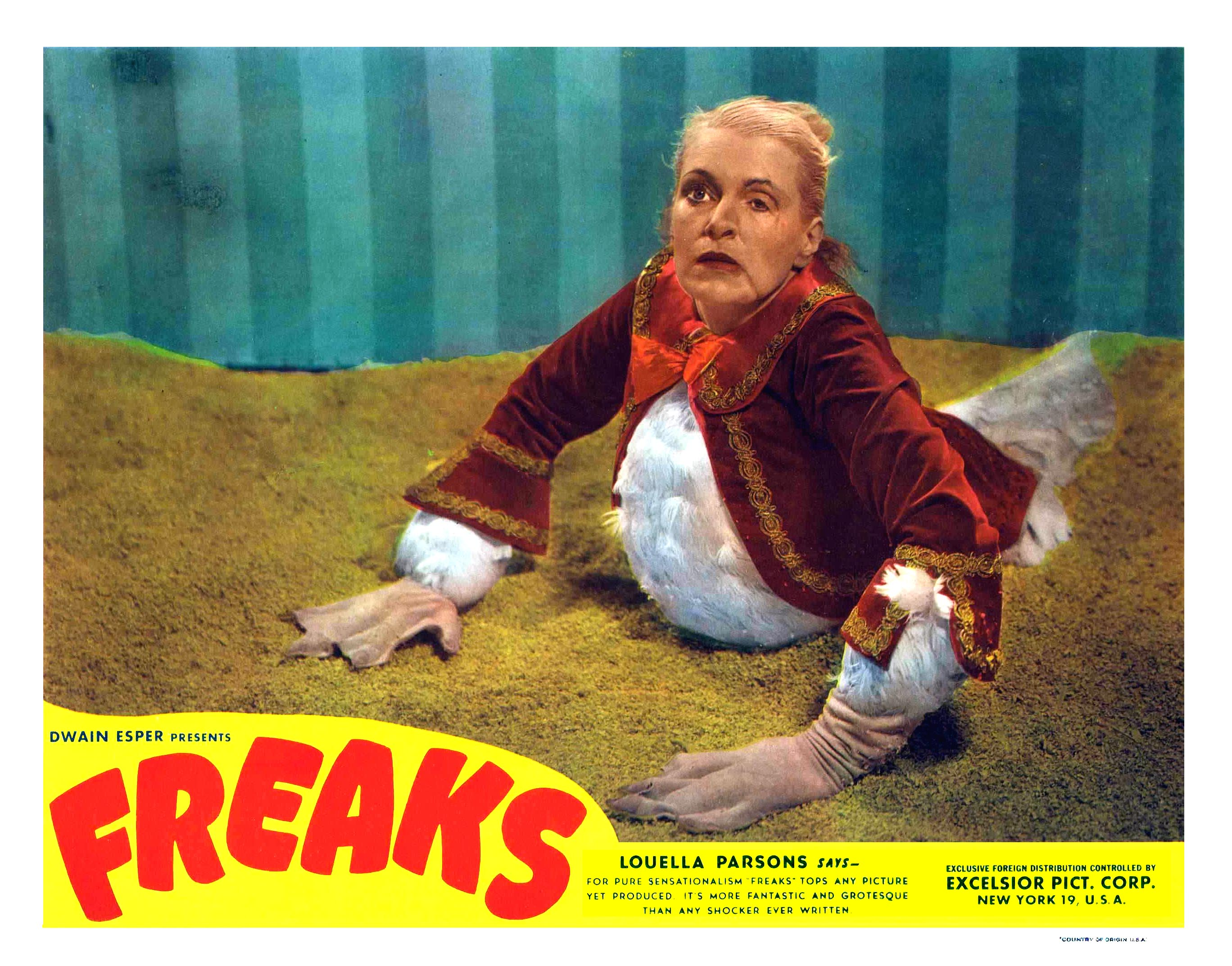
Baclanova in Freaks

In Russia, Baclanova's departure from the USSR made room for the success of Soviet movie star Lyubov Orlova, a struggling ex-pianist with a certain likeness to Olga. In 1926, Orlova was promoted from a choir after two months in a theatre, by the heart-broken Vladimir Nemirovich-Danchenko, a rumored lover or admirer of Baclanova, his favorite student. Fashion historian Alexandre Vassiliev remembered in 2018: "He [Vladimir] loved her [Olga] in letters, he was thinking deeply about her. The only time he cried [publicly], at the piano in the Art Theatre foyer, was when he had found out about Olga Vladimirovna Baclanova [emigration]... He really began to cry. I'm sure of this, not because I was there but because I was a friend of Sophia Pilyavskaya who was also closely connected to Nemirovich-Danchenko and could have known this from the wife of the famous director... Lyubov Orlova blossomed as Baclanova's substitute."

== Later years ==
After her retirement she migrated to Switzerland. She died at a rest home on 6 September 1974 from lung cancer in Vevey, aged 81, and apparently had Alzheimer's disease, although this is unconfirmed. She was interred at Corsier cemetery, in Corsier-sur-Vevey.

== Filmography ==
=== Russian films ===
Year	Title	Role	Notes
1914	Simfoniya lyubvi i smerti		
1914	Kogda zvuchat struny serdtsa		
1915	Velikiy Magaraz		
1915	Zhenshchina vampir	Title role	
1915	Po trupam k schastyu		
1915	Lyubov pod maskoy		
1916	Tot, kto poluchaet poshchechiny	L'écuyère Consuella, qu'il tue par amour	
1918	Khleb		

=== United States silent films ===
Year	Title	Role	Notes
1927	The Dove	Minor Role	Uncredited; Incomplete film
1928	The Czarina's Secret	Catherine the Great – The Czarina	Short
1928	Three Sinners	Baroness Hilda Brings	Lost film
1928	The Man Who Laughs	Duchess Josiana	
1928	Street of Sin	Annie	Lost film
1928	Forgotten Faces	Lilly Harlow	
1928	The Docks of New York	Mrs. Lou Roberts	
1928	The Woman Disputed	Countess	(scenes deleted)
1928	Avalanche	Grace Stillwell	Lost film

=== United States sound films ===
Year	Title	Role	Notes
1929	The Wolf of Wall Street	Olga	Lost film
1929	A Dangerous Woman	Tania Gregory	
1929	The Man I Love	Sonia Barondoff	
1930	Cheer Up and Smile	Yvonne	
1931	Are You There?	Countess Helenka	
1931	The Great Lover	Mme. Savarova	
1932	Freaks	Cleopatra	
1932	Downstairs	Baroness Eloise von Burgen	
1933	The Billion Dollar Scandal	Anna aka GoGo	
1943	Claudia	Madame Daruschka	

== Stage roles (US and UK) ==
- The Miracle (west coast production, 1926)
- The Farewell Supper (After on anatol), 1929
- Silent Witness (1931)
- Grand Hotel (1932)
- Twentieth Century (1932)
- The Cat and the Fiddle (west coast, 1932)
- $25 an Hour (Germaine Granville, 1933)
- Murder at the Vanities (Broadway Production, 1933)
- Mahogany Hill, Broadway, 1934)
- Going Place (London debut, 1936)
- Idiot's Delight (US tour), 1936
- Twentieth Century (US Tour revival, 1937)
- Claudia 1941–1943, US tour
- The Cat and the Fiddle (revival, New Jersey), 1945
- Louisiana Lady (summer stock, East Coast production, mid 1947)
- A Copy of Madame Aupic (East Coast, New Milford, summer stock, 1947)
