= Tangov =

An Abandoned Village in Astara, Azerbaijan

- Village
- Location within Azerbaijan
- Coordinates: 38°25′N 48°39′E
- Country: Azerbaijan
- Rayon: Astara
- Time zone: UTC+4 (AZT)

Tangov (also, Tango) is a village in the Astara Rayon of Azerbaijan. It's one of many historical village / hamlets in Astara-Lerik area.
