= Toto (nickname) =

Toto or Totò is a nickname which may refer to:

- Anthony Toto, nickname of Antonio di Nunziato d'Antonio, (1498–1554), Italian painter and architect
- Totò, nickname of Antonio Di Natale (born 1977), Italian footballer
- Toto, nickname of Emmanuel Constant (born 1956), Haitian death squad founder
- Toto Bissainthe, nickname of Marie Clotilde Bissainthe, (1934–1994), Haitian actress and singer
- Toto Cornejo, nickname of Oscar Roberto Cornejo Hernandez, (born 1983), Argentine footballer
- Totò Cuffaro, nickname of Salvatore Cuffaro (born 1958), Italian politician
- Toto Cutugno, nickname of Salvatore Cutugno (1943–2023), Italian pop singer-songwriter
- Toto D'Aquila, nickname of Salvatore D'Aquila (1873–1928), New York City Mafia boss
- Toto Karaca, stagename of İrma Felegyan, (1912–1992), Turkish stage actress
- Toto Koopman, nickname of Catharina Koopman (1908–1991), Dutch-Javanese model
- Toto Leonidas, nickname of Alfredo C. Leonidas (born 1960), professional poker player
- Toto Lorenzo, nickname of Juan Carlos Lorenzo (1922–2001), Argentine footballer and coach
- Toto Mangudadatu, nickname of Esmael Mangudadatu (born 1968), Filipino politician
- Totò Mignone, nickname of Ottone Mignone, (1906–1993), Italian dancer
- Toto Pongsawang, nickname of Chamlong Thamwiyot, (born c. 1968), Thai boxer and kickboxer
- Totò Riina, nickname of Salvatore Riina (1930–2017), Italian mobster
- Totò Savio, nickname of Gaetano Savio (1937–2004), Italian composer, lyricist, producer, guitarist, and occasional singer
- Totò Schillaci, nickname of Salvatore Schillaci (1964–2024), Italian former footballer
- Toto Terry, nickname of Alberto Terry Arias-Schreiber (1929–2006), Peruvian footballer
- Toto Wolff, nickname of Torger Christian Wolff (born 1972), Austrian investor and racing car driver

== See also ==
- Tono (name)
