= Antonio =

- Pronunciation: Spanish: [anˈtonjo] European Portuguese: [ɐ̃ˈtɔni.u, ɐ̃ˈtɔnju] Brazilian Portuguese: [ɐ̃ˈtoni.u, ɐ̃ˈtonju] Italian: [anˈtɔːnjo]
- Gender: Male
- Language: Bosnian, Bulgarian, Catalan, Croatian, Galician, Greek, Italian, Portuguese, Romanian, and Spanish
- Name day: June 13

Origin
- Meaning: Beyond praise

Other names
- See also: Anthony, Antony, Antoine, Antonius, Antonis, Tony, Antonia, Antonietta, Antonie, Antwan, Antone, Antoni, Antoin, Antonin, and Antuan, Andy, Tonino (given name)

Antonio is a masculine given name of probably Etruscan origin deriving from the root name Antonius. It is a common name among Romance language–speaking populations as well as the Balkans and Lusophone Africa. It has been among the top 400 most popular male baby names in the United States since the late 19th century and has been among the top 200 since the mid 20th century.

In the English language, it is translated as Anthony, and has some female derivatives: Antonia, Antónia, Antonieta, Antonietta, and Antonella'. It also has some male derivatives, such as Anthonio, Antón, Antò, Antonis, Antoñito, Antonino, Antonello, Tonio, Tono, Toño, Toñín, Tonino, Nantonio, Ninni, Totò, Tó, Tonini, Tony, Toni, Toninho, Toñito, and Tõnis. The Portuguese equivalent is António (Portuguese orthography) or Antônio (Brazilian Portuguese). In old Portuguese the form Antão was also used, not just to differentiate between older and younger but also between more and less important. In Galician the form is Antón, in Catalan Anton, and Basque Antxon and Andoni. The Greek versions of the name are Antonios (Αντώνιος) and Antonis (Αντώνης).

The name derives from Antonius, a well-known Latin family name, probably of Etruscan origin. The Roman general Marcus Antonius held that the origin of the name was Anthon (Ανθών), son of Hercules. This myth, recorded by Plutarch, was probably created by Marcus Antonius himself, in order to claim divine parentage. The name was in use throughout the Roman world which, at its height, comprised the whole of the Mediterranean, much of Europe and the Middle East. When the Roman Empire became Christian, the name continued to be popular because of the many great saints who bore it. Later, the name was spread all around the world as Christianity was brought to other locations.

== Notable male bearers ==
=== Antonio ===
- Antonio Abetti, Italian astronomer
- Antonio Abondio, Italian sculptor
- Antonio Aguilar, Mexican singer
- Antonio Almen (born 2004), Finnish footballer
- Antonio Azara, Italian jurist and politician
- Antonio Bamboccio, Italian painter and sculptor
- Antonio Banderas (born 1960), Spanish actor
- Antonio Rafael Barceló, Puerto Rican politician
- Antonio Bareiro (born 1989), Paraguayan footballer
- Antonio Barolini (1910–1971), Italian writer
- Antonio Barreto, Sri Lankan Sinhala Karava soldier who gained the title "Prince of Uva" under the name Kuruvita Rala in the Kingdom of Kandy
- Antonio Bassolino (born 1947), Italian politician
- Antonio Bazzini, Italian violinist and composer
- Antonio di Benedetto (1922–1986), Argentine writer
- Antonio Beretta, first mayor of Milan under the Kingdom of Italy from 1860 to 1867
- Antonio Bienvenida (1922–1975), Venezuelan-born Spanish bullfighter
- Antonio Blakeney (born 1996), American basketball player in the Israeli Basketball Premier League
- Antonio Bonazza (1698 – c. 1762), Italian sculptor
- Antonio Bosio (c. 1575 or 1576 – 1629), Maltese scholar
- Antonio Broccoli Porto, Puerto Rican artist
- Antonio Brown, American football player in the National Football League
- Antonio Bartolomeo Bruni, Italian violist, composer and conductor
- Antonio Cabán Vale, Puerto Rican singer
- Antonio Caldara, Italian composer
- Antonio Callaway, American football player in the National Football League
- Antonio Canaletto, Italian painter
- Antonio Candreva, Italian footballer
- Antonio Canova, Italian sculptor
- Antonio Benedetto Carpano, Italian distiller, famous for having invented the Vermouth and consequently the apéritif
- Antonio Marziale Carracci, Italian painter
- Antonio Cassano, Italian footballer
- Antonio Cavallucci, Italian painter
- Antonio Cermeño, Venezuelan boxer
- Antonio Cervantes, Colombian boxer
- Antonio Chenel Albadalejo, Spanish bullfighter, known as Antoñete
- Antonio Cifaldi (1899–1967), Italian politician
- Antonio Citterio, Italian furniture designer
- Antonio Conte, Italian former footballer
- António Corea, Korean enslaved person
- Antonio Corradini, Italian sculptor
- Antonio Corallo (1913–2000), known as Anthony Corallo, American mobster
- Antonio Correa Cotto, Puerto Rican criminal
- Antonio da Correggio, Italian painter
- Antonio Corti, Argentine boxer
- António Costa, Portuguese Prime Minister.
- Antonio Davis, US basketball player
- Antonio de La Gándara, painter
- Antonio de la Rúa, former first son of Argentina
- Antonio de Nigris (1978–2009), Mexican footballer
- Antonio Della Rossa (born 1982), Austrian politician
- Antonio Di Natale, Italian footballer
- Antonio Dixon (American football), American football player
- Antonio Donnarumma, Italian footballer
- Antonio Escobar (disambiguation)
- Antonio Esparragoza, Venezuelan boxer
- Antonio Falzon, Maltese military engineer
- António Félix da Costa, Portuguese racing driver and Formula E champion
- Antonio Ferreira de Oliveira Junior, Brazilian soccer player
- Antonio Floro Flores, Italian footballer
- Antonio Fogazzaro, Italian novelist
- Antonio Gamoneda, Spanish poet
- Antonio Gandy-Golden (born 1998), American football player
- Antonio Garay (born 1979), American NFL football player
- Antonio García (disambiguation), multiple people
- Antonio Gates, American player of American football
- Antonio Gherardi, Italian painter, architect, and sculptor
- Antonio Ghislieri, better known as Pope Pius V
- Antonio Gibson (born 1998), American football running back
- Antonio Gibson (safety) (born 1962), American football safety
- Antonio Giovinazzi, Italian Formula One driver
- Antonio González (martyr), Spanish Roman Catholic martyr and saint
- Antonio Gramsci, Italian writer, politician and political theorist
- Antonio Grier (born 2000), American football player
- Antonio Guidi, Italian politician
- Antonio Guzmán Blanco, former Venezuelan president
- Antonio Harmon, American football player
- Antonio Hernández (disambiguation)
- Antonio Indjai, Guinea-Bissau's army chief of staff and one of the leaders who orchestrated a coup in the country on 1 April 2010
- Antonio Inoki, Japanese wrestler
- Antonio Inutile, Finnish-Italian former footballer
- Antonio Janigro, Italian cellist and conductor
- Antônio Carlos Jobim, Brazilian creator of the bossa nova
- Antonio Johnson (disambiguation), multiple people
- Antonio Landa, Mexican footballer
- Antonio Langella, Italian footballer
- Antonio Latimer, Puerto Rican basketball player
- Antonio Leonhardt (born 1994), German politician
- Antonino Lo Surdo (1880–1949), Italian physicist and co-discoverer of the Stark effect
- Antonio Lombardo, Italian sculptor
- Antonio Lopez, United States illustrator who signed his work "Antonio."
- Antonio Lotti, Italian composer
- Antonio Luna, Filipino Revolutionary Army and General of The Philippine Revolutionary in The First Philippine Republic
- Antonio Lupatelli (1930–2018), Italian illustrator and writer
- Antonio Maccanico, Italian politician
- Antonio Maceo Grajales, Cuban general
- Antonio Machado, Spanish poet
- Antonio Mancini, Italian painter
- Antonio Manetti, Italian mathematician and architect
- Antonio Maria Maraggiano, Italian sculptor
- Antonio Margarito, American boxer
- Antonio Martini, Italian biblical scholar and Archbishop of Florence
- Antonio Martino, Italian politician
- Antonio Marzano, Italian politician
- Antonio Mazzariello, Italian singer-songwriter
- Antonio McDyess, United States basketball player
- Antonio Tobias Mendez, American sculptor
- Antônio Meneses, Brazilian cellist
- Antonio Meucci, Italian-American inventor
- Antonio Monda, Italian film director
- António Monteiro, Portuguese diplomat
- Antonio Mosconi, Italian politician
- António Mota, Portuguese trader and explorer
- Antonio Narcisse, American football player
- Antonio Nariño, Colombian ideologist and politician
- Antonio Negri, Italian philosopher
- Antonio Nocerino, Italian footballer
- Antonio Nusa, Norwegian footballer
- Antônio Rodrigo Nogueira and his brother Antônio Rogério Nogueira, both Brazilian mixed martial artists
- Antonio Pantojas, Puerto Rican actor
- Antonio Paoli, Puerto Rican opera singer
- Antonio Pappano, British conductor
- Antonio S. Pedreira, Puerto Rican poet
- Antonio Pigafetta, Italian explorer
- Antonio Pignatelli, better known as Pope Innocent XII
- Antônio Pires Ferreira, Brazilian farmer
- Antonio del Pollaiuolo, Italian painter
- Antonio Prieto, Spanish long-distance runner
- Antonio Puerta, Spanish international footballer
- Antonio Raul Corbo, American child actor
- Antonio Reeves (born 2000), American basketball player
- Antonio de los Reyes Correa, Puerto Rican military hero
- Antonio Rivera, Puerto Rican boxer
- Antonio Rodríguez Balinas, Puerto Rican US Army general
- Antonio Rosmini-Serbati, Italian philosopher
- Antonio Rossi, Italian canoer
- Antonio Roybal, Spanish American painter
- Antonio Rüdiger, German footballer
- Antonio Ruiz Soler, Flamenco dancer (known as "Antonio")
- Antonio Rukavina, Serbian footballer
- Antonio Sabàto Jr., Italian-American model and actor
- Antonio Sacchini, Italian composer
- António de Oliveira Salazar, Portuguese statesman and prime minister
- Antonio Salieri, Austrian Court Composer, famous "mediocre" rival of Mozart
- António Salvador, Portuguese long-distance runner
- Antonio Sánchez, Mexican musician
- Antonio Sánchez, Puerto Rican show host
- Antonio Sciortino, Maltese sculptor
- Antonio Segni, Italian politician
- Antonio Semini, Italian painter
- Antonio Silio, Argentine long-distance runner
- Antonio Starabba, Marchese di Rudinì, Prime Minister of Italy between 1891 and 1892 and from 1896 until 1898
- Antonio Stradivari, Italian luthier
- Antonio Tabucchi, Italian writer
- Antonio Taguba, a Filipino-American retired major general of the US Army
- Antonio Tarver, United States boxer
- Antonio de Torquemada, Spanish writer
- Antonio Travi, Italian painter
- Antonio Valero de Bernabé, Puerto Rican, helped Simón Bolívar liberate South America
- Antonio Valencia, Ecuadorian footballer
- Antonio Veciana, Cuban exile who founded Alpha 66
- Antonio Maria Vassallo, Italian painter
- Antonio Vivaldi, Italian composer
- Antonio Watts (born 2003), American football player
- Antonio Williams (disambiguation), multiple people
- Antonio Zarro, Academy Award-winning Italian screenwriter

Antonio may also refer to:

- The Great Antonio, Canadian strongman, professional wrestler, and actor
- Antonio (singer), Jamaican reggae singer born Maurice Silvera

=== Antonio as middle name ===
- Carlo Antonio Buffagnotti, Italian painter
- Carlo Antonio Tavella, Italian painter
- Eugene Antonio Marino, first African American archbishop in the United States
- Francesco Antonio Franzoni, Italian sculptor
- Giacomo Antonio Arland, Italian painter
- Gioachino Antonio Rossini, Italian composer
- Giovanni Antonio Amadeo, Italian sculptor
- Giovanni Antonio Dosio, Italian architect and sculptor
- Giovanni Antonio Facchinetti, better known as Pope Innocent IX
- Giovanni Antonio Pellegrini, Italian painter
- Giovanni Antonio Scopoli, Italian-Austrian physician and naturalist
- José Antonio Bowen, American jazz musician and president of Goucher College
- José Antonio de la Garza, Mexican-American politician
- Juan Antonio Jara, Paraguayan politician
- Juan Antonio Marichal, Dominican baseball player
- Luis Antonio Tagle, Filipino cardinal and current pro-prefect of the Dicastery for Evangelization
- Antonio Valencia, Ecuadorian footballer
- Marco Antonio Barrera, Mexican boxer
- Marco Antonio Etcheverry, Bolivian soccer player
- Marco Antonio Muñiz, Mexican singer
- Marco Antonio Muñiz, Puerto Rican singer, better known as Mark Anthony, named after the Mexican singer
- Marco Antonio Regil, Mexican show host
- Marco Antonio Solís, Mexican singer
- Niccolò Antonio Zingarelli, Italian composer
- Tomaso Antonio Vitali, Italian composer

=== Known as Tony ===
- Tony Álvarez, Major League Baseball center fielder
- Tony Alvarez (actor), Spanish-Australian actor
- Tony Alvarez (singer), Cuban singer
- Tony Ayala Jr., Mexican-American boxer
- Tony Baltazar, Mexican-American boxer
- Tony Campos, Mexican-American musician
- Tony Carreira, Portuguese singer
- Tony Danza, Italian-American boxer and actor
- Tony Fratto, Deputy Press Secretary
- Tony Parker, French basketball player
- Tony Peña, retired Major League Baseball player
- Tony Pérez, Hall of Fame Major League Baseball player
- Tony Plana, Cuban actor
- Tony Romo, American football quarterback
- Tony Sanchez (disambiguation), multiple people
- Tony Vega, Puerto Rican singer

== Fictional characters ==
Antonio may refer to the fictional characters:

- Antonio "Toni" Cipriani, the main character from Grand Theft Auto: Liberty City Stories
- Antonio Fernández Carriedo (アントーニョ・フェルナンデス・カリエド), the given human name for the personification of Spain from the anime series Hetalia: Axis Powers
- Antonio Garcia, a character in the television show Power Rangers: Samurai
- Antonio (The Merchant of Venice), the title character in Shakespeare's The Merchant of Venice
- Antonio, a character in Shakespeare's Much Ado About Nothing
- Antonio, a character in Shakespeare's The Tempest
- Antonio, a character in Shakespeare's Twelfth Night
- Antonio, a hunter in the video game Identity V
- Antonio Bologna, a character in Webster's The Duchess of Malfi
- "Toni" Antonio, a character in the children's television show Trumpton
- Antonio, a character on the television show Monster Warriors
- Antonio "Tony" Montana, the main character in the film Scarface
- Antonio, an anteater villager in the Animal Crossing series
- Antonio, a character in the video game Assassin's Creed II
- Antonio the male otter, a character in the animated TV show The Penguins of Madagascar
- Antonio, one of the scarlet macaw players in the Pit of Doom in Rio 2
- Antonio “Tony” Padilla, a character in the novel and Netflix series 13 Reasons Why
- Antonio, the protagonist's father in the movie Nahuel and the Magic Book
- Antonio Madrigal, a character in Encanto
- Antonio Perez, a character in the animated film Despicable Me 2

== Other uses ==
- Antonino, Kansas, a community in the United States
- MV Antonios, a number of motor vessels with this or a similar name
- "Oh! Oh! Antonio!" music-hall song performed by Florrie Forde
- San Antonio, second largest city in Texas

== Surnames ==
- Carol Antonio Altamirano (born 1963), Mexican politician
- Ebony Antonio (born 1991), female Australian rules footballer
- Lou Antonio (born 1934), American actor and director
- Mapuana Antonio, American public health academic
- Michail Antonio (born 1990) is an English professional footballer
- Pablo Antonio (1901–1975), Filipino architect

== See also ==
- Antonic
- Antonijo
- Antonik
- Antonin (name)
- Antonino (name)
- Antonios, name
- Antoñito (name)
- Antoniu
- Antono (name)
- Entonio Pashaj
