= Giuseppe Orsoni =

Italian painter

Giuseppe Orsoni (1691–1755) was an Italian painter and scenic designer of the Baroque period, active in Northern Italy.

He first studied under Domenico Maria Viani, then studied quadratura under Pompeo Aldrovandini. He was active as a scenic designer in Genoa, Lucca, Turin, and Brescia. He worked with Stefano Orlandi in Bologna, and with Carlo Antonio Buffagnotti. He was made a professor of the Accademia Clementina.
