= List of actor-politicians =

Actors who became politicians, and vice versa

This is a list of individuals who achieved recognition and success both as actors and as politicians.

The phenomenon of actors becoming politicians is seen across the world, with many leveraging their public recognition, communication skills, and charisma to influence public policy and achieve electoral success. While most began as actors and transitioned to politics, some started as politicians and later pursued acting careers.

== North America ==
=== United States ===
Actor-politician	Acting career	Party	Office(s)	Year(s)
Clay Aiken	Actor and singer	Democratic	Nominee for North Carolina 2	2014
Clay Aiken	Actor and singer	Democratic	Candidate for North Carolina 4	2022
Alan Autry	Actor	Independent	Mayor of Fresno, California	2001–2009
Rex Bell	Actor	Republican	Lieutenant Governor of Nevada	1955–1962
Frank Bogert	Actor, rodeo announcer	Republican	Mayor of Palm Springs, California	1958–1966, 1982–1988
Sonny Bono	Actor and singer-songwriter	Republican	Mayor of Palm Springs, California	1988–1992
Sonny Bono	Actor and singer-songwriter	Republican	U.S. Representative - California 44	1995–1998
Kimberlin Brown	Actress (The Young and the Restless, The Bold and the Beautiful)	Republican	Candidate for California 36	2018
Marilyn Chambers	Pornographic film actress	Personal Choice Party	Nominee for Vice President	2004
Marilyn Chambers	Pornographic film actress	Boston Tea Party	Alternate write-in candidate to vice-presidential running mate	2008
Wendell Corey	Actor	Republican	Member of the Santa Monica City Council	1965–1968
Wendell Corey	Actor	Republican	Candidate for U.S. Representative	1966
Albert Dekker	Actor	Democratic	Member of the California State Assembly	1945–1947
Cherie DeVille	Pornographic film actress	Democratic	Candidate for President	2020
Bob Dornan	Actor (12 O'Clock High, local television personality)	Republican	U.S. Representative - California 27, 38, 46	1977–1983, 1985–1997
Bob Dornan	Actor (12 O'Clock High, local television personality)	Republican	Candidate for U.S. Senate	1982
Bob Dornan	Actor (12 O'Clock High, local television personality)	Republican	Candidate for President	1996
Helen Gahagan Douglas	Actress in Broadway theatre and film	Democratic	U.S. Representative- California 14	1945–1951
Helen Gahagan Douglas	Actress in Broadway theatre and film	Democratic	Nominee for U.S. Senate	1950
Clint Eastwood	Actor	Republican	Mayor of Carmel-by-the-Sea, California	1986–1988
Charles Farrell	Actor		Mayor of Palm Springs, California	1947–1955
Joe Flynn	Actor	Republican	Candidate for the Ohio Senate	1950
Al Franken	Actor and comedian (Saturday Night Live), radio personality (The Al Franken Show)	Democratic	U.S. Senator - Minnesota	2009–2018
John Gavin	Actor (Psycho, Spartacus)	Republican	U.S. Ambassador to Mexico	1981–1986
Melissa Gilbert	Actress	Democratic	Candidate for Michigan 8	2016
Vic Gilliam	Part-time actor (Screen Actors Guild membership)	Republican	Member of the Oregon House of Representatives	2007–2017
Fred Grandy	Actor (The Love Boat), radio personality (The Grandy Group)	Republican	U.S. Representative - Iowa 6 and 5	1987–1995
Fred Grandy	Actor (The Love Boat), radio personality (The Grandy Group)	Republican	Candidate for Governor	1996
Hill Harper	Actor (CSI: NY, The Good Doctor)	Democratic	Candidate for U.S. Senate in Michigan	2024
J. G. Hertzler	Actor (Star Trek: Deep Space Nine)	Democratic (until 2017); Independent (from 2017)	Ulysses, New York town councillor	2013–2020
J. G. Hertzler	Actor (Star Trek: Deep Space Nine)	Democratic (until 2017); Independent (from 2017)	Candidate for New York 23	2018
Gil Hill	Actor (Beverly Hills Cop)	Democratic	Member of the Detroit City Council	1990–2001
Gil Hill	Actor (Beverly Hills Cop)	Democratic	Candidate for Mayor of Detroit	2001
Glenn Jacobs	Actor and professional wrestler	Republican	Mayor of Knox County, Tennessee	2018–present
Ben Jones	Actor	Democratic	U.S. Representative - Georgia 4	1989–1993
Jack Kelly	Actor (Maverick)	Republican	Mayor of Huntington Beach, California	1983–1986
Sheila Kuehl	Former child actress	Democratic	California State Assembly	1994–2000
Sheila Kuehl	Former child actress	Democratic	California State Senate	2000–2008
Sheila Kuehl	Former child actress	Democratic	Los Angeles County Board of Supervisors	2014–2022
Nancy Kulp	Actor (The Beverly Hillbillies)	Democratic	Candidate for Pennsylvania 9	1984
Sonny Landham	Actor (The Warriors, Predator, 48 Hrs., Lock Up and Action Jackson)	Republican	Candidate for Governor of Kentucky	2003
Sonny Landham	Actor (The Warriors, Predator, 48 Hrs., Lock Up and Action Jackson)	Libertarian	Candidate for U.S. Senate in Kentucky	2008
Al Lewis	Actor (The Munsters, Car 54, Where Are You?)	Green	Candidate for Governor of New York	1998
John Davis Lodge	Actor (The Scarlet Empress, The Little Colonel)	Republican	U.S. Representative - Connecticut 4	1947–1951
John Davis Lodge	Actor (The Scarlet Empress, The Little Colonel)	Republican	Governor of Connecticut	1951–1955
Bob Mathias	Actor (China Doll, It Happened in Athens)	Republican	U.S. Representative - California 18	1967–1975
Christopher Mitchum	Actor	Republican	Candidate for California State Assembly	1998
Christopher Mitchum	Actor	Republican	Candidate for California 24	2012, 2014
George Murphy	Actor	Republican	U.S. Senator - California	1965–1971
Diane Neal	Actor	Independent	Candidate for New York 19	2018
Cynthia Nixon	Actress	Democratic	Candidate for Governor of New York	2018
Park Overall	Actress	Democratic	Candidate for U.S. Senate in Tennessee	2008
Stephen Peace	Actor and producer (Killer Tomatoes franchise)	Democratic	California State Assembly	1982–1992
Stephen Peace	Actor and producer (Killer Tomatoes franchise)	Democratic	California Senate	1993–2002
Richard Petty	Actor, professional racecar driver (Cars, Days of Thunder, Stroker Ace)	Republican	Member of the Randolph County, North Carolina Commission	1978–1994
Richard Petty	Actor, professional racecar driver (Cars, Days of Thunder, Stroker Ace)	Republican	Candidate for Secretary of State of North Carolina	1996
Steven Michael Quezada	Actor	Democratic	Member of the Albuquerque, New Mexico school board	2013–2017
Steven Michael Quezada	Actor	Democratic	Member of the Bernalillo County, New Mexico Commission	2017–2025
Trey Radel	Actor (StartUp)	Republican	U.S. Representative - Florida 19	2013–2014
Ronald Reagan	Actor	Republican	Governor of California	1967–1975
Ronald Reagan	Actor	Republican	President of the United States	1981–1989
Tex Ritter	Actor and country music singer	Republican	Candidate for U.S. Senate in Tennessee	1970
Will Rogers	Actor	Democratic	Mayor of Beverly Hills, California	1928
Will Rogers Jr.	Actor	Democratic	U.S. Representative - California 16	1943–1944
Antonio Sabàto Jr.	Model and actor (General Hospital)	Republican	Candidate for California 26	2018
Ben Savage	Actor	Democratic	Candidate for California 30	2024
Arnold Schwarzenegger	Actor and retired bodybuilder	Republican	Governor of California	2003–2011
Jerry Springer	Actor (Ringmaster) and talk show host (The Jerry Springer Show)	Democratic	Candidate for Ohio 2	1970
Jerry Springer	Actor (Ringmaster) and talk show host (The Jerry Springer Show)	Democratic	Member of Cincinnati City Council	1971–1974
Jerry Springer	Actor (Ringmaster) and talk show host (The Jerry Springer Show)	Democratic	Mayor of Cincinnati	1977–1978
George Takei	Actor (Star Trek)	Democratic	Alternate delegate to Democratic National Convention	1972
George Takei	Actor (Star Trek)	Democratic	Candidate for Los Angeles City Council	1973
George Takei	Actor (Star Trek)	Democratic	Candidate for California State Assembly	1980
Shirley Temple Black	Former child actor	Republican	Candidate for California 11	1967
Shirley Temple Black	Former child actor	Republican	U.S. Ambassador to Ghana	1974–1976
Shirley Temple Black	Former child actor	Republican	U.S. Chief of Protocol	1976–1977
Shirley Temple Black	Former child actor	Republican	U.S. Ambassador to Czechoslovakia	1989–1992
Fred Thompson	Actor	Republican	U.S. Senator - Tennessee	1994–2003
Fred Thompson	Actor	Republican	Candidate for President	2008
Jesse Ventura	Actor and professional wrestler	Independent (until 1998); Reform (1998–2000); Independence (2000–2003)	Mayor of Brooklyn Park, Minnesota	1991–1995
Jesse Ventura	Actor and professional wrestler	Independent (until 1998); Reform (1998–2000); Independence (2000–2003)	Governor of Minnesota	1999–2003
Ralph Waite	Actor (The Waltons)	Democratic	Candidate for California 37	1990
Ralph Waite	Actor (The Waltons)	Democratic	Candidate for California 44	1998
Ralph Waite	Actor (The Waltons)	Democratic	Candidate for California 39	1998
Noble Willingham	Actor (Walker, Texas Ranger)	Republican	Candidate for Texas 1	2000

=== Canada ===
Actor-politician	Acting career	Political party	Political career	Source
Jeremy Akerman	Film actor	Nova Scotia New Democratic Party	Member of the Nova Scotia House of Assembly for Cape Breton East (1970–1980)	
Jeremy Akerman	Film actor	Nova Scotia New Democratic Party	Leader of the Nova Scotia New Democratic Party (1968–1980)	
Elizabeth Ball	Shakespeare theater actor		Vancouver City Councillor	
Tyrone Benskin	Actor and theatre director	New Democratic Party	Member of the Canadian House of Commons for Jeanne-Le Ber	
Sonya Biddle	Stage actress	Vision Montreal	Montreal City Councillor	
Andrée Champagne	Actress (Les Belles Histoires des pays d'en haut)	Conservative	Minister of State for Youth (1984–1986)	
Andrée Champagne	Actress (Les Belles Histoires des pays d'en haut)	Conservative	Member of the Canadian House of Commons for Saint-Hyacinthe—Bagot (1984–1993)	
Andrée Champagne	Actress (Les Belles Histoires des pays d'en haut)	Conservative	Member of the Senate of Canada for Grandville (2005–2014)	
Pierre Curzi	Genie-and-Jutra-winning actor	Parti Québécois	Member of the National Assembly of Quebec for Borduas	
Sébastien Dhavernas	Actor and dub actor	Liberal	Candidate in the 2008 Canadian federal election in Outremont	
Sébastien Dhavernas	Actor and dub actor	Équipe Denis Coderre pour Montréal	Candidate in the 2013 Montreal municipal election in Desmarchais-Crawford	
Tina Keeper	Gemini-winning actress and filmmaker	Liberal	Member of the Canadian House of Commons for Churchill (2006–2008)	
Maka Kotto	Actor	Bloc Québécois	Candidate in the 2003 Quebec general election in Viau	
Maka Kotto	Actor	Bloc Québécois	Member of the Canadian House of Commons for Saint-Lambert (2004–2008)	
Maka Kotto	Actor	Parti Québécois	Member of the National Assembly of Quebec for Bourget (2008–2018)	
Jean Lapointe	Genie-winning actor, comedian	Liberal	Member of the Senate of Canada for Saurel (2005–2014)	
Alexandrine Latendresse	Actress	New Democratic Party	Member of the Canadian House of Commons for Louis-Saint-Laurent (2011–2015)	
Susan Leblanc	Actress	New Democratic Party	Member of the Nova Scotia House of Assembly for Dartmouth North (2017–present)	
Viola Léger	Actress	Liberal	Member of the Senate of Canada for L'Acadie (2001–2005)	
Greg Malone	Actor, impressionist (CODCO)	New Democratic Party	Candidate in the 2000 St. John's West by-election	
Greg Malone	Actor, impressionist (CODCO)	Green Party of Canada	Candidate in the 2019 Canadian federal election in Avalon	
Jean-Louis Roux	Actor, playwright (La famille Plouffe)	Liberal	Member of the Senate of Canada for Mille Isles (1994–1996); Lieutenant Governor of Quebec (1996–1997)	
Lenore Zann	Actor	Independent (since 2019; provincial only)	Member of the Nova Scotia House of Assembly for Truro-Bible Hill-Millbrook-Salmon River (2009–2019) (Note: It was known as Truro-Bible Hill at the time of Zann's election, but it was renamed in the 2012 electoral boundary review.)	
Lenore Zann	Actor	Nova Scotia New Democratic Party (2009–2019; provincial only)	Member of the Nova Scotia House of Assembly for Truro-Bible Hill-Millbrook-Salmon River (2009–2019)	
Lenore Zann	Actor	Liberal Party of Canada	Member of the House of Commons of Canada for Cumberland—Colchester (since 2019)	

=== Mexico ===
Actor-politician	Acting career	Political party	Political career	Source
Irma Serrano			Member of the Senate of the Republic	
Carmen Salinas		Institutional Revolutionary Party	Member of the Chamber of Deputies	

== Central and South America ==
=== Brazil ===
Actor-politician	Acting career	Political party	Political career	Source
Alexandre Frota	Pornographic film actor	Brazilian Social Democracy Party (PSDB) (2019–present)	Federal Deputy for São Paulo (2019–present)	
Alexandre Frota	Pornographic film actor	Social Liberal Party (PSL) (2018–2019)	Federal Deputy for São Paulo (2019–present)	
Ana de Hollanda	Singer and actress	None	Minister of Culture (2011–2012)	
Bete Mendes	Actress	Brazilian Democratic Movement (MDB) (1985–1999)	State Secretary of Culture of São Paulo (1987–1988)	
Bete Mendes	Actress	Workers' Party (PT) (1980–1985)	Federal Deputy for São Paulo (1983–1991)	
Celso Frateschi	Actor	Workers' Party (PT)	Municipal Secretary of Culture of São Paulo (1997–1998)	
Daisy Lúcidi	Actress	Reform Progressive Party (PPR)	State Deputy of Rio de Janeiro	
Daisy Lúcidi	Actress	Liberal Front Party (PFL)	State Deputy of Rio de Janeiro	
Daisy Lúcidi	Actress	Democratic Social Party (PDS)	Alderwoman of Rio de Janeiro	
Gretchen	Singer and actress	Citizenship (CIDADANIA)	Unsuccessful candidate for Mayor of Ilha de Itamaracá	
Kito Junqueira	Actor	Progressives (PP) (-2019)	State Deputy of São Paulo (1995–1999)	
Kito Junqueira	Actor	Green Party (PV)	State Deputy of São Paulo (1995–1999)	
Manoel Gomes	Singer	Partido Liberal (PL) (2022)	Unsuccessful candidate for State Deputy of Maranhão	
Mário Frias	Actor	None	Special Secretary of Culture (2020–present)	
Regina Duarte	Actress	None	Special Secretary of Culture (2020)	
Rita Cadillac	Singer, dancer and pornographic film actress	Brazilian Socialist Party (PSB)	Unsuccessful candidate for Alderwoman of Praia Grande	
Stepan Nercessian	Actor	Citizenship (CIDADANIA) (1992–present)	Federal Deputy for Rio de Janeiro (2011–2015)	
Stepan Nercessian	Actor	Brazilian Communist Party (PCB) (1964–1992)	Alderman of Rio de Janeiro (2005–2010)	
Tiririca	Actor, clown and Humorist	Liberal Party (PL) (2010–present)	Federal Deputy for São Paulo (2019–present)	
Toninho do Diabo	Actor and singer	Solidarity (SD)	Unsuccessful candidate for Federal Deputy for São Paulo	

=== Argentina ===
Actor-politician	Acting career	Political party	Political career	Source
Eva Perón		Justicialist Party and Female Peronist Party	President of the Female Peronist Party	

=== Chile ===
Actor-politician	Acting career	Political party	Political career	Source
Luciano Cruz-Coke	Actor	Evópoli	Minister of Culture, Arts and Heritage (2010-2013)	
Luciano Cruz-Coke	Actor	Evópoli	Member of the Chamber of Deputies (2018-2022)	
Luciano Cruz-Coke	Actor	Evópoli	Member of the Senate (2022-present)	

=== Guatemala ===
Actor-politician	Acting career	Political party	Political career	Source
Jimmy Morales	Actor and comedian	National Convergence Front	50th President of Guatemala	

=== Panama ===
Actor-politician	Acting career	Political party	Political career	Source
Rubén Blades		Mother Earth Movement (MPE)	Unsuccessful candidate for President of Panama	

== Europe ==
Country	Actor-politician	Acting career	Party	Offices	Years
Armenia	Hayk Marutyan	Producer, comedian, filmmaker, actor	Civil Contract	Mayor of Yerevan	2018–2021
Germany	Peter Sodann		Left Party	Candidate for President	2009
Iceland	Jón Gnarr		Best Party (2009–2014); Viðreisn (2024–present)	Mayor of Reykjavík	2010–2014
Iceland	Jón Gnarr		Best Party (2009–2014); Viðreisn (2024–present)	Member of Althing – Reykjavik South	2024–present
Italy	Beppe Grillo		Five Star Movement	Leader of the Five Star Movement	2009–2017
Italy	Beppe Grillo		Five Star Movement	Guarantor of the Five Star Movement	2017–2024
Italy	Gina Lollobrigida		I Democratici	Candidate for MEP	1999
Italy	Gina Lollobrigida		Sovereign and Popular Italy	Candidate for Senate	2022
Italy	Alessandra Mussolini		MSI (1992–1995); AN (1995–2003); AS (2003–2009); AS (2004–2006); PdL (2009–2013); FI (2013–2018; 2019–2025)	Member of the Chamber of Deputies from Naples	1992–2004
Italy	Alessandra Mussolini		MSI (1992–1995); AN (1995–2003); AS (2003–2009); AS (2004–2006); PdL (2009–2013); FI (2013–2018; 2019–2025)	Member of the Chamber of Deputies from Campania 1	2008–2013
Italy	Alessandra Mussolini		MSI (1992–1995); AN (1995–2003); AS (2003–2009); AS (2004–2006); PdL (2009–2013); FI (2013–2018; 2019–2025)	Member of the Senate from Campania	2013–2014
Italy	Alessandra Mussolini		MSI (1992–1995); AN (1995–2003); AS (2003–2009); AS (2004–2006); PdL (2009–2013); FI (2013–2018; 2019–2025)	MEP from Central Italy	2004–2008, 2014–2019, 2022–2024
Italy	Ilona Staller		Partito Radicale & Partito dell'Amore	Member of the Chamber of Deputies from Lazio	1987–1992
Netherlands	Boris van der Ham		Democrats 66	Member of the House of Representatives	2002–2012
Norway	Ellen Horn		Labour	Minister of Culture	2000–2001
Poland	Aleksandra Gajewska	Actress, theatre director	Civic Platform	Member of the Silesian Voivodeship Sejmik	2007–2013
Poland	Lech Kaczyński		Law and Justice; Independent	Member of the Sejm	1991–1993; 2001–2002
Poland	Lech Kaczyński		Law and Justice; Independent	President of the Supreme Audit Office	1992–1995
Poland	Lech Kaczyński		Law and Justice; Independent	Minister of Justice; Public Prosecutor General	2000–2001
Poland	Lech Kaczyński		Law and Justice; Independent	Mayor of Warsaw	2002–2005
Poland	Lech Kaczyński		Law and Justice; Independent	President of Poland	2005–2010
Poland	Jarosław Kaczyński		Law and Justice	Member of the Sejm from Warsaw I	1991–1993
Poland	Jarosław Kaczyński		Law and Justice	Member of the Sejm from Warsaw I & Kielce	1997–present
Poland	Jarosław Kaczyński		Law and Justice	Prime Minister of Poland	2006–2007
Poland	Jarosław Kaczyński		Law and Justice	Deputy Prime Minister of Poland	2020–2022; 2023
Poland	Paweł Kukiz		Kukiz'15	Member of Lower Silesian Regional Assembly	2014–2015
Poland	Paweł Kukiz		Kukiz'15	Member of the Sejm from Warsaw II & Opole	2015–present
Poland	Paweł Kukiz		Kukiz'15	Candidate for President	2015
Serbia	Ljubiša Preletačević		Independent	Candidate for President	2017
Slovenia	Marjan Šarec		List of Marjan Šarec; Freedom Movement	Prime Minister of Slovenia	2018–2020
Slovenia	Marjan Šarec		List of Marjan Šarec; Freedom Movement	Minister of Defence	2022–2024
Slovenia	Marjan Šarec		List of Marjan Šarec; Freedom Movement	Member of the European Parliament	2024–present
Spain	Toni Cantó		Union, Progress and Democracy; Citizens; People's	Member of the Congress of Deputies	2011–2015; 2016–2019
Spain	Toni Cantó		Union, Progress and Democracy; Citizens; People's	Member of the Corts Valencianes	2019–2021
Spain	Juanjo Puigcorbé		Republican Left of Catalonia	Councillor of the City Council of Barcelona	
Ukraine	Volodymyr Zelenskyy	Comedian and film actor and director	Servant of the People	President of Ukraine	2019–present
Ukraine	Roman Hryshchuk	Comedian and film actor	Servant of the People	People's Deputy of Ukraine	2019–present

=== Russia ===
Actor-politician	Acting career	Political party	Political career	Years
Vladimir Bortko	Actor and film director	Communist Party	Member of the State Duma	2011–2021
Rolan Bykov	Stage and film actor	Common Deed	People's Deputy of the Soviet Union	1989–1991
Rolan Bykov	Stage and film actor	Common Deed	Candidate for the State Duma	1995
Yury Solomin	Stage and film actor, director	Independent	Minister of Culture	1990–1991
Vitaly Churkin	Former child actor	Independent	Ambassador to Belgium	1994–1998
Vitaly Churkin	Former child actor	Independent	Ambassador to Canada	1998–2003
Vitaly Churkin	Former child actor	Independent	Ambassador to the United Nations	2006–2017
Yevgeni Gerasimov	Actor and film director	United Russia	Member of the Moscow City Duma	2001–present
Stanislav Govorukhin	Actor and film director	Independent, later United Russia	Member of the State Duma	1994–2003, 2005–2018
Stanislav Govorukhin	Actor and film director	Independent, later United Russia	Candidate for President	2000
Nikolai Gubenko	Stage and film actor and director	Communist Party	USSR Minister of Culture	1989–1991
Nikolai Gubenko	Stage and film actor and director	Communist Party	Member of the State Duma	1995–2003
Nikolai Gubenko	Stage and film actor and director	Communist Party	Member of the Moscow City Duma	2005–2020
Natalya Gundareva	Stage and film actress	Women of Russia	Member of the State Duma	1994–1996
Yuli Gusman	Actor, TV presenter, director	Choice of Russia	Member of the State Duma	1994–1996
Yelena Drapeko	Stage and film actress	Communist Party, later A Just Russia	Member of the State Duma	1999–present
Mikhail Evdokimov	Actor, comedian and TV presenter	Independent	Governor of Altai Krai	2004–2005
Mikhail Evdokimov	Actor, comedian and TV presenter	Independent	Candidate for State Duma	1995, 2003
Alexey Sevastyanov	Actor	United Russia	Member of the Pskov Oblast Assembly of Deputies	2007–present
Mariya Kozhevnikova	Actress	United Russia	Member of the State Duma	2011–2016
Sergey Boyarsky	Former child actor	United Russia	Member of the State Duma	2016–present
Ksenia Sobchak	Actress and TV presenter	Civic Initiative	Candidate for President	2018
Dmitry Pevtsov	Actor	Independent (caucused with New People)	Member of the State Duma	2021–present
Nikolai Burlyayev	Actor and film director	A Just Russia — For Truth	Member of the State Duma	2021–present

=== United Kingdom ===
Actor-politician	Acting career	Political party	Political career	Years
George Alexander	Stage actor	Municipal Reform Party	London County Councillor for South St Pancras	1907–1913
Marina Baker	Actor and Playboy Playmate	Liberal Democrats	Lewes District Councillor	?–2007
Marina Baker	Actor and Playboy Playmate	Liberal Democrats	Candidate for MP – Brighton Kemptown	2005
Bruce Belfrage	Stage actor	Liberal	Candidate for MP – South Buckinghamshire	1950
Louise Bours		UKIP (until 2018); Independent (from 2018)	MEP for North West England	2014–2019
Tracy Brabin	Actress and television writer	Labour	MP for Batley and Spen	2016–2021
Tracy Brabin	Actress and television writer	Labour	Mayor of West Yorkshire	2021–present
Derwent Hall Caine	Stage actor	Labour	MP for Liverpool Everton	1929–1931
Michael Cashman	Actor (EastEnders)	Labour	MEP for West Midlands	1999–2014
Michael Cashman	Actor (EastEnders)	Labour	Member of the House of Lords	2014–present
Alfred Denville	Actor and theatre impresario	Conservative	MP for Newcastle upon Tyne Central	1931–1945
Jimmy Edwards	Actor	Conservative	Candidate for MP – Paddington North	1964
Meredith Edwards	Character actor	Plaid Cymru	Candidate for MP – Denbigh	1966
David Ensor	Television actor	Labour	MP for Bury and Radcliffe	1964–1970
Andrew Faulds	Actor	Labour	MP for Smethwick	1966–1974
Andrew Faulds	Actor	Labour	MP for Warley East	1974–1997
Richard Franklin	Actor (Doctor Who)		Perennial candidate in general elections	see Political activities
James Gaddas	Actor	Conservative	Candidate for MP – Stockton South	2005
Helen Griffin	Actress (Doctor Who)	RESPECT The Unity Coalition	Candidate for MEP	2004
Cheryl Hall	Actress	Labour	Candidate for MP – Canterbury	1997
Cheryl Hall	Actress	Labour	Kent County Councillor	?
Glenda Jackson	Oscar-winning actress (Women in Love, A Touch of Class)	Labour	MP for Hampstead and Highgate	1992–2010
Glenda Jackson	Oscar-winning actress (Women in Love, A Touch of Class)	Labour	MP for Hampstead and Kilburn	2010–2015
Edwin James	Stage actor (The London Merchant)	Liberal	MP for Marylebone	1859–?
Debi Jones	Actor	Conservative	Crosby Councillor for Manor ward	?
Debi Jones	Actor	Conservative	Candidate for MP – Sefton Central	2010
Rustie Lee	Actress and TV personality	UKIP	Candidate for MP – Wyre Forest	2005
Liz Lynne	Actress	Liberal Democrats	MP for Rochdale	1992–1997
Liz Lynne	Actress	Liberal Democrats	MEP for West Midlands	1999–2012
Bill Maynard	Film and television actor	Independent	Candidate for MP – Chesterfield	1984
Al Murray	Actor and comedian	Free United Kingdom Party	Candidate for MP – South Thanet	2015
Cecil Ramage	Stage actor	Liberal	MP for Newcastle upon Tyne West	1923–1924
James Robertson Justice	Character actor	Labour	Candidate for MP – North Angus and Mearns	1950
Willie Rushton	Actor and comedian	Independent	Candidate for MP – Kinross and Western Perthshire	1963
Giles Watling	Actor	Conservative	Tendring District Councillor for Frinton ward	2007–2016
Giles Watling	Actor	Conservative	MP for Clacton	2017–2024

== Asia ==
Country	Actor-politician	Acting career	Political party	Political career	Source
Bangladesh	Kabori Sarwar		Bangladesh Awami League		
Bangladesh	Asaduzzaman Noor		Bangladesh Awami League		
Bangladesh	Farooque		Bangladesh Awami League		
China	Jiang Qing		Chinese Communist Party		
Indonesia	Rhoma Irama			Founder and chairperson of Partai Islam Damai Aman	
Indonesia	Zumi Zola		National Mandate Party		
Israel	Yair Lapid				
Pakistan	Atiqa Odho				
Pakistan	Fauzia Wahab				
Pakistan	Abrar-ul-Haq				

=== India ===
Actor-Politician	Acting career	Political Party	Political Career	Source
Mithun Chakraboy		Bharatiya Janata Party (2021–present)	Nominated Rajya Sabha MP	
Ushasie Chakraborty				
Mukhyamantri Chandru				
Locket Chatterjee		Bharatiya Janata Party	Lok Sabha MP for Hooghly, West Bengal	
Harindranath Chattopadhyay				
Dipika Chikhlia	Played Sita in Ramanand Sagar's Ramayan	BJP	Former Lok Sabha MP	
Sunny Deol	Hindi Film Actor	Bharatiya Janata Party	Lok Sabha MP	
Dev		All India Trinamool Congress	Lok Sabha MP	
Devan				
Dharmendra		Bharatiya Janata Party	Former Lok Sabha MP	
Sanjay Dutt		Samajwadi Party	Former General Secretary of the party	
Sunil Dutt		Indian National Congress	Former Lok Sabha MP	
K. B. Ganesh Kumar		Left Democratic Front	Member of Kerala Legislative Assembly	
Roopa Ganguly		Bharatiya Janata Party	Rajya Sabha MP	
Suresh Gopi		Bharatiya Janata Party	Rajya Sabha MP, Kerala	
Arun Govil	played Ram in Ramanand Sagar's Ramayan	Bharatiya Janata Party	Candidate in 1980 Lok Sabha election	
Govinda		Indian National Congress	Former Lok Sabha MP. Left politics in 2008.	
Innocent				
Smriti Irani	Acted in Hindi serials and films	Bharatiya Janata Party	Member of Parliament, Cabinet Minister of Women & Child Development and Textiles	
F. G. Natesa Iyer				
Jaaved Jaaferi		Aam Aadmi Party	Candidate in 2014 Lok Sabha election	
Jagadish				
Jaggayya			First Indian actor to be elected as a Member of Parliament	
Jaggesh		Bharatiya Janata Party	Member of the party	
Nusrat Jahan		All India Trinamool Congress	Lok Sabha MP	
Jamuna	played as Sathya Bhama in Sri Krishna Tulabharam	Indian National Congress	Elected as member of the Lok Sabha	
Jaya Prada	played as Hema Pradhan in Sargam	Bharatiya Janata Party	Former Lok Sabha MP	
B. Jayashree				
Jayasudha		Bharatiya Janata Party	Former MLA of Andhra Pradesh	
Bina Kak				
Pawan Kalyan		Jana Sena Party	Founder of the Party	
Mahesh Kanodia				
Naresh Kanodia				
Vaishali Kasaravalli				
Navaneet Kaur Rana		Bharatiya Janata Party	Lok Sabha MP	
Kavitha				
Arshi Khan		Indian National Congress	Candidate in 2019 Lok Sabha election	
Rajesh Khanna		Indian National Congress	Former Lok Sabha MP	
Vinod Khanna		Bharatiya Janata Party	Former Member of Parliament	
Kirron Kher	played as Sumitra in Devdas	Bharatiya Janata Party	Lok Sabha MP	
Ravi Kishan		Bharatiya Janata Party	Lok Sabha MP	
Amol Kolhe	Marathi serial and movie actor	Nationalist Congress Party (Sharadchandra Pawar)	Lok Sabha MP	
Dilip Kumar				
Shashi Kumar				
Bappi Lahiri	Famous music director	Bharatiya Janata Party	Candidate in 2014 Lok Sabha election	
Paidi Lakshmayya				
Chindodi Leela				
O. Madhavan				
Harihara Mahapatra				
Sidhant Mohapatra				
Hema Malini	Indian film actress	Bharatiya Janata Party	Lok Sabha MP	
Mahesh Manjrekar		Maharashtra Navnirman Sena	Candidate in 2014 Lok Sabha election	
Bhagwant Mann				
Urmila Matondkar	Indian film actress	Shiv Sena	Member of the party	
Mohanlal				
Anubhav Mohanty				
Aparajita Mohanty				
Mukesh				
Murali				
Anant Nag		Janata Dal (Secular)	Candidate in 2004 Lok Sabha election	
Nagma	Indian film actress	Indian National Congress	Vocal supporter of the party	
B. T. Lalitha Naik				
Prashanta Nanda				
Naresh				
Nargis				
Kajal Nishad				
Gul Panag		Aam Aadmi Party	Candidate in 2014 Lok Sabha election	
Pandiyan				
Chirag Paswan				
B. C. Patil				
Jaya Prada				
Bullet Prakash				
Prakash Raj		Independent	Candidate in 2019 Lok Sabha Election	
Krishnam Raju				
Rakshita				
Paresh Rawal		Bharatiya Janata Party	Former Lok Sabha MP	
Rekha		Independent	Nominated Rajya Sabha MP	
J. K. Rithesh				
Sandhya Roy				
Satabdi Roy				
Sharada				
Kaikala Satyanarayana				
Rakhi Sawant		Republican Party of India (A)	Candidate in 2014 Lok Sabha elections	
Moon Moon Sen		All India Trinamool Congress	Former Lok Sabha MP	
Shabana Azmi		Communist Party of India	Star campaigner of the party	
Shilpa Shinde		Indian National Congress	Candidate in the 2019 Indian general election	
Shruti		Bharatiya Janata Party	Ex-chairperson of the Women's Development Corporation and Chief Secretary of Mahila Morcha	
Dara Singh		All India Jat Mahasabha	President of the party and Nominated Rajya Sabha MP	

Andhra Pradesh
Name	Political Party	Party Position	Political Career
Dasari Narayana Rao	Indian National Congress	Steady	Former Minister of State for Coal and Mines
K. Chiranjeevi	Indian National Congress	Steady	Former Minister of State (Independent Charge) for Tourism
Pawan Kalyan	Jana Sena Party	Founder of the party	Deputy Chief Minister of Andhra Pradesh
Kota Srinivasa Rao	Bharatiya Janata Party	Steady	Former Member of the Andhra Pradesh Legislative Assembly
M. Mohan Babu	Telugu Desam Party	Steady	Former Rajya Sabha MP
Murali Mohan	Telugu Desam Party	Steady	Former Lok Sabha MP
N. T. Rama Rao	Telugu Desam Party	Founder of the party	Former Chief Minister of Andhra Pradesh
Nandamuri Balakrishna	Telugu Desam Party	Steady	Member of the Andhra Pradesh Legislative Assembly
Nandamuri Harikrishna	Telugu Desam Party	Steady	Former Rajya Sabha MP
Rao Gopal Rao	Telugu Desam Party	Steady	Former Rajya Sabha MP
Roja Selvamani	Yuvajana Shramika Rythu Congress Party	Steady	Former Minister for Tourism, Culture and Youth Advancement of Andhra Pradesh
Bihar
Name	Political Party	Party Position	Political Career
Nitish Bharadwaj	Bharatiya Janata Party	Steady	Former Lok Sabha MP
Gujarat
Name	Political Party	Party Position	Political Career
Arvind Trivedi	Bharatiya Janata Party	Steady	Former Lok Sabha MP
Upendra Trivedi	Independent	Steady	Former Deputy Speaker of the Gujarat Legislative Assembly
Karnataka
Name	Political Party	Party Position	Political Career
Kumar Bangarappa	Bharatiya Janata Party	Steady	Former Member of the Karnataka Legislative Assembly
M. H. Ambareesh	Indian National Congress	Steady	Former Minister of State for Information and Broadcasting
Madhu Bangarappa	Indian National Congress	Steady	Minister for Primary and Secondary Education of Karnataka
Malavika Avinash	Bharatiya Janata Party	State Spokesperson of the party	Steady
Ramya	Indian National Congress	Steady	Former Lok Sabha MP
Umashree	Indian National Congress	Steady	Former Minister for Women and Child Development of Karnataka
B. M. Upendra Kumar	Uttama Prajaakeeya Party	Founder of the party	Steady
Keralam
Name	Political Party	Party Position	Political Career
Suresh Gopi	Bharatiya Janata Party	Steady	Minister of State for Petroleum, Natural Gas, and Tourism
National Capital Territory of Delhi
Name	Political Party	Party Position	Political Career
Manoj Tiwari	Bharatiya Janata Party	Former State President of the party	Lok Sabha MP
Vani Tripathi	Bharatiya Janata Party	Former National Secretary of the party	Steady
Tamil Nadu
Name	Political Party	Party Position	Political Career
A. Mansoorali Khan	Tamilaga Vettri Kazhagam	Member of the party	Steady
A. Vijay Tamilan Parthiban	Tamilaga Vettri Kazhagam	Salem Central District Secretary of the party	Minister for Transport of Tamil Nadu
Arun Pandian	All India Anna Dravida Munnetra Kazhagam	Steady	Former Member of the Tamil Nadu Legislative Assembly
C. Joseph Vijay	Tamilaga Vettri Kazhagam	Founder of the party	Chief Minister of Tamil Nadu
C. R. Saraswathi	Amma Makkal Munnettra Kazagam	Propaganda Secretary of the party	Steady
D. Napoleon	Bharatiya Janata Party	Former State Vice President of the party	Former Minister of State for Social Justice and Empowerment
Gayathri Raguram	All India Anna Dravida Munnetra Kazhagam	Women's Wing Deputy Secretary of the party	Steady
J. Jayalalithaa	All India Anna Dravida Munnetra Kazhagam	Former General Secretary of the party	Former Chief Minister of Tamil Nadu
K. Bhagyaraj	M.G.R. Makkal Munnetra Kazhagam	Founder of the party	Steady
Kamal Haasan	Makkal Needhi Maiam	Founder of the party	Rajya Sabha MP
Karthik	Manitha Urimaigal Kaakkum Katchi	Founder of the party	Steady
Karunas	Mukkulathor Pulipadai Katchi	Founder of the party	Former Member of the Tamil Nadu Legislative Assembly
Kavingnar Snekan	Makkal Needhi Maiam	Youth Wing Secretary of the party	Steady
Khushbu Sundar	Bharatiya Janata Party	State Vice President of the party	Steady
Kovai Sarala	Makkal Needhi Maiam	Former Core Committee Member of the party	Steady
Kutty Padmini	Bharatiya Janata Party	Former State Executive Committee Member of the party	Steady
M. G. Ramachandran	All India Anna Dravida Munnetra Kazhagam	Founder of the party	Former Chief Minister of Tamil Nadu
M. K. Stalin	Dravida Munnetra Kazhagam	President of the party	Former Chief Minister of Tamil Nadu
M. Karunanidhi	Dravida Munnetra Kazhagam	Former President of the party	Former Chief Minister of Tamil Nadu
Namitha	Bharatiya Janata Party	State Executive Committee Member of the party	Steady
Pala. Karuppiah	Tamil Nadu Thannurimai Kazhagam	Founder of the party	Former Member of the Tamil Nadu Legislative Assembly
R. Sarathkumar	Bharatiya Janata Party	Member of the party	Former Rajya Sabha MP
Radha Ravi	Bharatiya Janata Party	State Executive Committee Member of the party	Former Member of the Tamil Nadu Legislative Assembly
Radikaa Sarathkumar	Bharatiya Janata Party	Member of the party	Steady
Rajmohan	Tamilaga Vettri Kazhagam	Deputy General Secretary of the party	Minister for School Education, Tamil Development, Information and Publicity of Tamil Nadu
Ramarajan	All India Anna Dravida Munnetra Kazhagam	Steady	Former Lok Sabha MP
S. S. Chandran	All India Anna Dravida Munnetra Kazhagam	Steady	Former Rajya Sabha MP
S. S. Rajendran	All India Anna Dravida Munnetra Kazhagam	Steady	Former Rajya Sabha MP
S. Ve. Shekher	Dravida Munnetra Kazhagam	Steady	Former Member of the Tamil Nadu Legislative Assembly
Seeman	Naam Tamilar Katchi	Chief Coordinator of the party	Steady
Sivaji Ganesan	Thamizhaga Munnetra Munnani	Founder of the party	Former Rajya Sabha MP
Srinath	Tamilaga Vettri Kazhagam	Administrator of the party	Minister for Fisheries – Fishermen Welfare of Tamil Nadu
Sripriya Sethupathi	Makkal Needhi Maiam	Central Governing Body Member of the party	Steady
T. Rajendar	All India Latchiya Dravida Munnetra Kazhagam	Founder of the party	Former Member of the Tamil Nadu Legislative Assembly
Thol. Thirumavalavan	Viduthalai Chiruthaigal Katchi	President of the party	Lok Sabha MP
Udhayanidhi Stalin	Dravida Munnetra Kazhagam	Youth Wing Secretary of the party	Former Deputy Chief Minister of Tamil Nadu
V. N. Janaki	All India Anna Dravida Munnetra Kazhagam	Steady	Former Chief Minister of Tamil Nadu
Vagai Chanderasekar	Dravida Munnetra Kazhagam	Steady	Former Member of the Tamil Nadu Legislative Assembly
Vijayakanth	Desiya Murpokku Dravida Kazhagam	Founder of the party	Former Leader of the Opposition in the Tamil Nadu Legislative Assembly
Vijayakumar (Alias) Vijay Vasanth	Indian National Congress	State General Secretary of the party	Lok Sabha MP
Vindhyaa	All India Anna Dravida Munnetra Kazhagam	Joint Propaganda Secretary of the party	Steady
Vyjayanthimala	Bharatiya Janata Party	Steady	Former Rajya Sabha MP
Y. G. Madhuvanthi	Bharatiya Janata Party	State Executive Committee Member of the party (as Madhuvanthi Arun)	Steady
Telangana
Name	Political Party	Party Position	Political Career
Vijaya Shanthi	Indian National Congress	State Campaign Committee Chief Coordinator of the party	Former Lok Sabha MP
Uttar Pradesh
Name	Political Party	Party Position	Political Career
Amitabh Bachchan	Indian National Congress	Steady	Former Lok Sabha MP
Jaya Bachchan	Samajwadi Party	Steady	Rajya Sabha MP
Raj Babbar	Indian National Congress	Former State President of the party	Former Lok Sabha MP
Rajpal Yadav	Sarva Sambhav Party	Founder of the party	Steady
West Bengal
Name	Political Party	Party Position	Political Career
George Baker	Bharatiya Janata Party	Steady	Former Lok Sabha MP
Mimi Chakraborty	All India Trinamool Congress	Steady	Lok Sabha MP
Shatrughan Sinha	All India Trinamool Congress	Steady	Former Minister of Shipping

=== Japan ===
Actor-politician	Acting career	Political party	Political career	Source
Yukio Aoshima	Shabondama Holiday, Iji-waru Baasan	Independent; Dainiin Club	Member of the House of Councillors (1968–1995); Governor of Tokyo (1995–1999)	
Nobuo Asaoka			Member of the House of Councilors (1947-?); Deputy Secretary of Health Administration	
Hideo Higashikokubaru	Takeshi Castle	Independent (2007–2012); Japan Restoration (2012–2013)	Governor of Miyazaki (2007–2011); Member of the House of Representatives (2012–2013)	
Hiroki Hōjō	Actress (Takarazuka Revue)		Member of Takarazuka City Council (2007-?)	
Shintaro Ishihara	Actor and director (Crazed Fruit, The Hole)	Liberal Democratic (1968–1995); Independent (1995–2012); Sunrise (2012); Japan Restoration (2012–2014); Future Generations (2014)	Member of the House of Councillors (1968–1972); Member of the House of Representatives (1972–1995, 2012–2014); Governor of Tokyo (1999–2012)	
Shigeru Kanai	Actor		Member of Edogawa Ward Council (2011–present)	
Keiichi Kurokawa	Actor and tarento		Member of Nagoya City Council (2011–2015)	
Akira Matsu	Actor (Takarazuka Revue)	New Komeito	Member of the House of Councillors (1995–2007, 2007–2013)	
Junko Mihara	Actor	Liberal Democratic	Member of the House of Councillors (2010–present)	
Kensaku Morita			Member of the House of Councillors (1992–1998); Member of the House of Representatives (1998–2003); Governor of Chiba (2009–present)	
Kaori Nakajima	Actress (Takarazuka Revue)		Member of Ashiya City Council (2007–2019); Member of Hyogo Prefectural Assembly (2019–present)	
Chikage Oogi	Actor (Takarazuka Revue)	New Conservative	Member of the House of Councilors (1977–2007); Minister of Land, Infrastructure, Transport and Tourism (2001–2003); Minister of Construction (2000–2001); Secretary of the National Land Agency (2000–2001); Minister of Transport (2000–2001); Secretary of the Hokkaido Development Agency (2000–2001); President of the House of Councillors (2004–2007)	
Akiko Santō	Actress	Liberal Democratic	Member of the House of Councillors (1974–1992, 1995–1996, 2001-present); Director General of Science and Technology Agency (1990–1991); Vice-president of the House of Councilors (2007–2010); President of the House of Councilors (2019–Present)	
Tamaki Sawa	Actress	New Frontier; Komeito	Member of the House of Councillors (1998–2003)	
Junya Takaki	Actor	Liberal Democratic	Mayor of Ashiya, Fukuoka	
Yoshiko Yamaguchi	Actor (Manchukuo propaganda films)	Liberal Democratic	Member of the House of Councillors (1974–1992)	
Taro Yamamoto	Actor	Independent (2011–2014); People's Life (and later Liberal 2016)	Member of the House of Councillors (2013–present)	
Katsuhiko Yokomitsu	Actor	Constitutional Democratic	Member of the House of Representatives (1993–2012, 2017–present)	

=== Philippines ===
Actor-politician	Acting career	Political party	Political career	Source
Aga Muhlach	Actor	Liberal	Candidate in the 2013 Philippine House of Representatives elections in Camarines Sur's 4th congressional district	
Angelu de Leon	Actress	Aksyon Demokratiko	Councilor, Pasig City (2022–present)	
Aiko Melendez	Actress	Nacionalista Party; Pwersa ng Masang Pilipino (2009–10)	Member of the Quezon City Council (2001–2010; 2022–present)	
Alfred Vargas	Actor and model	PDP–Laban; Liberal (2012–2017); Lakas Kampi CMD (2009–2010)	Member of the House of Representatives of the Philippines from Quezon City's 5th congressional district Member of the Quezon City Council (2010–2013; 2022–present)	
Alma Moreno	Actress	United Nationalist Alliance (2014–2016); Liberal (2013)	Candidate in the 2016 Philippine Senate election Member of the Parañaque City Council (2007–2016)	
Andrea Del Rosario	Actress and model	Nacionalista	Vice mayor of Calatagan, Batangas (2016–2019)	
Angelica Jones	Actress and singer	Partido Federal ng Pilipinas; Liberal (2015–2016); United Nationalist Alliance (2013–2015); Nacionalista (2010–2013)	Member of the Laguna Provincial Board (2010–2016, 2019–present)	
Anjo Yllana	Actor and comedian	Liberal (2015–2019); United Nationalist Alliance (2012–2015); Pwersa ng Masang Pilipino (1998–2015)	Member of the Quezon City Council (2013–2019); Vice mayor of Parañaque (2004–2007); Member of the Parañaque City Council (1998–2004)	
Cesar Montano	Actor and film director	Liberal (2010); Lakas–CMD (2007)	Candidate in the 2010 Bohol gubernatorial election Candidate in the 2007 Philippine Senate election	
Charee Pineda	Actress	Nationalist People's Coalition	Member of the Valenzuela City Council; Sangguniang Kabataan chairman of Parada, Valenzuela City (2007–2010)	
Christopher de Leon	Actor	Liberal; Pwersa ng Masang Pilipino (2007)	Member of the Batangas Provincial Board (2010–2013)	
Cita Astals	Actress		Member of the Manila City Council (1998–2007)	
Cristina Gonzales	Actress		Mayor of Tacloban; Member of the Tacloban City Council (2007–2016)	
Danilo Fernandez	Actor	National Unity Party	Member of the House of Representatives of the Philippines from Laguna's 1st congressional district (2007–2016, 2019–present); Mayor of Santa Rosa, Laguna (2016–2019); Vice governor of Laguna (2001–2004); Member of the Laguna Provincial Board (1998–2001)	
Daniel Fernando	Actor	National Unity Party	Governor of Bulacan; Vice governor of Bulacan (2010–2019); Member of the Bulacan Provincial Board (1998–2007)	
Dennis Roldan	Actor and basketball player	Nationalist People's Coalition	Member of the House of Representatives of the Philippines from Quezon City's 3rd congressional district (1992–1995)	
Edu Manzano	Actor, television presenter, and comedian	Pwersa ng Masang Pilipino; Independent (1998–2009, 2011-?); Lakas-Kampi-CMD (2010)	Vice mayor of Makati (1998–2001); Candidate in the 2019 Philippine House of Representatives elections in San Juan's at-large congressional district Candidate in the 2016 Philippine Senate election Candidate in the 2010 Philippine vice presidential election	
Ejay Falcon	Actor and model	PDP–Laban	Candidate in the 2022 Oriental Mindoro vice gubernatorial election	
Fernando Poe Jr.	Actor	Koalisyon ng Nagkakaisang Pilipino	Candidate in the 2004 Philippine presidential election	
Freddie Webb	Actor, broadcaster, and basketball player		Senator of the Philippines (1992–1998); Member of the House of Representatives of the Philippines from Parañaque's lone congressional district (1987–1992); Member of the Pasay City Council (1971–1978)	
Gary Estrada	Actor	Pwersa ng Masang Pilipino	Member of the Quezon Provincial Board (2010–2016)	
George Estregan, Jr.	Actor	PDP–Laban; United Nationalist Alliance (2012–2016); Pwersa ng Masang Pilipino (2001–2012)	Governor of Laguna (2010–2014); Mayor of Pagsanjan, Laguna (2001–2010)	
Gian Sotto	Actor	Hugpong ng Pagbabago	Vice mayor of Quezon City; Member of the Quezon City Council (2010–2019)	
Guia Gomez	Actress	Pwersa ng Masang Pilipino (2010–2013, 2016–2019); United Nationalist Alliance (2013–2016)	Mayor of San Juan (2010–2019)	
Girlie "Maita" Javier-Ejercito	Actress	Partido Federal ng Pilipinas; United Nationalist Alliance (2012–2018); Pwersa ng Masang Pilipino (2009–2018)	Vice mayor of Pagsanjan, Laguna; Mayor of Pagsanjan, Laguna (2010–2012)	
Herbert Bautista	Actor	Nationalist People's Coalition (1992–1994, 2017–present); PDP-Laban (2017); Liberal (2009–2017); Lakas CMD (?-2009); Laban ng Demokratikong Pilipino (1995–1998)	Mayor of Quezon City (2010–2019); Vice mayor of Quezon City (1995–1998, 2001–2010); Member of the Quezon City Council (1986–1989, 1992–1995)	
Imelda Papin	Singer	PDP-Laban; Liberal (2015–2018); Lakas (1997–2000, 2013); Bangon Pilipinas (2010); Laban ng Demokratikong Pilipino (2000–2004)	Vice governor of Camarines Sur (1998–2004, 2019–present); Candidate in the 2004 and 2016 Philippine House of Representatives elections in Camarines Sur's 4th congressional district Candidate in the 2013 Philippine House of Representatives elections in San Jose del Monte's at-large congressional district Candidate in the 2010 Philippine Senate election	
Isko Moreno	Actor	Aksyon Demokratiko; Asenso Manileño (local party); National Unity Party (2016–2021); Pwersa ng Masang Pilipino (2014–2016); United Nationalist Alliance (2010–2014); Nacionalista (2006–2010)	Mayor of Manila (2019–2022); Vice mayor of Manila (2007–2016); Member of the Manila City Council (1998–2007); Candidate in the 2016 Philippine Senate Elections; Candidate in the 2022 Philippine Presidential Elections	
Jason Abalos	Actor	PDP-Laban	Member of the Nueva Ecija Provincial Board (2022–present)	
Jestoni Alarcon	Actor	Nationalist People's Coalition	Member of the Rizal Provincial Board; Vice governor of Rizal (2004–2007); Member of the Antipolo City Council (2001–2004)	
Jhong Hilario	Actor and dancer	United Nationalist Alliance	Member of the Makati City Council (2016–present)	
Jinggoy Estrada	Actor and film producer	Pwersa ng Masang Pilipino	Senator of the Philippines (2004–2016, 2022–present); Mayor of San Juan (1992–2001); Vice Mayor of San Juan (1988–1992)	
Joey Marquez	Actor and comedian		Mayor of Parañaque (1995–2004); Vice mayor of Parañaque (1992–1995)	
Jomari Yllana	Actor, model, and race car driver	PDP-Laban; Independent (2015–2018)	Member of the Parañaque City Council	
Jolo Revilla	Actor and comedian	PDP-Laban; Lakas-CMD; United Nationalist Alliance (2014–2016)	Vice Governor of Cavite; Barangay captain of Panapan VII, Bacoor, Cavite (2010–2013)	
Joseph Estrada	Actor	Pwersa ng Masang Pilipino	President of the Philippines (1998–2001); Vice president of the Philippines (1992–1998); Senator of the Philippines (1987–1992); Mayor of Manila (2013–2019); Mayor of San Juan (1969–1986)	
Julian Trono	Actor and dancer		Sangguniang Kabataan chairman of San Martin de Porres, Quezon City	
Lani Mercado-Revilla	Actress	PDP-Laban	Mayor of Bacoor (2016–2022), Cavite; Member of the House of Representatives of the Philippines from Cavite's 2nd congressional district (2010–2016, 2022–present)	
Lito Lapid	Actor	Nationalist People's Coalition (1991–1998, 2018–present); Independent (2012–2018); Lakas-CMD (1998–2012); Koalisyon ng Katapatan at Karanasan sa Kinabukasan (2004)	Senator of the Philippines (2004–2016, 2019–present); Governor of Pampanga (1995–2004); Vice governor of Pampanga (1992–1995)	
Lou Veloso	Actor, comedian, and director	Pwersa ng Masang Pilipino	Member of the Manila City Council (1995–2004, 2007–2013, 2019-present)	
Lucy Torres-Gomez	Actress	PDP-Laban; Liberal (2010–2016)	Member of the House of Representatives of the Philippines from Leyte's 4th congressional district (2010–2013, 2013–present)	
Manny Pacquiao	Professional boxer and actor	PDP-Laban (2012–2014, 2016–present); People's Champ Movement (local party); United Nationalist Alliance (2012–2016); Liberal (before 2007, 2010–2012); Nacionalista (2009–2010); Kabalikat ng Malayang Pilipino (2007–2008); PROMDI (2022)	Senator of the Philippines (2016–2022); Member of the House of Representatives of the Philippines from Sarangani's at-large congressional district (2010–2016); Candidate in the 2007 Philippine House of Representatives elections in South Cotabato's 1st congressional district Candidate in the 2022 Philippine Presidential Elections	
Maricel Morales	Actress and beauty queen		Member of the Angeles City Council (2007–2016)	
Marjorie Barretto	Actress		Member of the Caloocan City Council (2007–2013)	
Monsour del Rosario	Actor and film producer	Partido para sa Demokratikong Reporma; PDP-Laban (2018–2021); United Nationalist Alliance (2012–2018); Nacionalista (2010–2012)	Member of the House of Representatives of the Philippines from Makati's 1st congressional district (2016–2019); Member of the Makati City Council (2010–2016); Candidate in the 2022 Philippine Senate Elections	
Nash Aguas	Actor, businessman/entrepreneur, real-estate investor	Lakas-CMD	Councilor, Cavite City (2022–present)	
Nora Aunor	Actress	Aksyon Demokratiko (2001)	Candidate in the 2001 Camarines Sur gubernatorial election	
Ramon Revilla Sr.	Actor	Lakas	Senator of the Philippines (1992–2004)	
Bong Revilla	Actor and television presenter	Lakas-CMD	Senator of the Philippines (2004–2016, 2019–present); Governor of Cavite (1998–2001); Vice governor of Cavite (1995–1998)	
Rey Malonzo	Actor and film director		Mayor of Caloocan (1995–2004)	
Richard Gomez	Actor, television presenter, and film director	PDP-Laban	Mayor of Ormoc (2016–2022); Member of the House of Representatives of the Philippines from Leyte's 4th congressional district (2022–present)	
Rico J. Puno	Singer, actor, and television host	United Nationalist Alliance; Una ang Makati (local party); PDP-Laban (before 2015)	Member of the Makati City Council (1998–2007, 2016–2018)	
Robin Padilla	Actor, television host	PDP-Laban	Senator (2022–present)	
Roderick Paulate	Actor, television host, and comedian	Nationalist People's Coalition	Member of the Quezon City Council (2010–2016, 2016–2019)	
Rogelio de la Rosa	Actor	Liberal	Senator of the Philippines (1957–1963)	
Rommel Padilla	Actor, model, and film producer		Member of the Nueva Ecija Provincial Board (2007–2010, 2016–2019)	
Roselle Nava	Actress and singer	Liberal (2010–2012, 2015–2019); United Nationalist Alliance (2012–2015)	Member of the Parañaque City Council (2010–2019)	
Rudy Fernandez	Actor and film producer	Pwersa ng Masang Pilipino	Candidate in the 2001 Quezon City mayoral election	
Sonny Parsons	Actor, singer, and film director		Member of the Marikina City Council (1992–1995)	
Tito Sotto	Actor, singer, comedian, and television presenter	Nationalist People's Coalition; United Nationalist Alliance (2013–2015); Laban ng Demokratikong Pilipino (1987–2007)	Senator of the Philippines (1992–2004, 2010–2022); Vice mayor of Quezon City (1988–1992)	
Vandolph Quizon	Actor and comedian	PDP-Laban; Liberal (2015–2018)	Member of the Parañaque City Council	
Vilma Santos	Actress	Nacionalista; Liberal (2009–2018); Lakas-CMD (1998–2009)	Member of the House of Representatives of the Philippines from Batangas's 6th congressional district (2016–2022); Governor of Batangas (2007–2016); Mayor of Lipa, Batangas (1998–2007)	
Yoyong Martirez	Actor, basketball player, and comedian	Nacionalista	Member of the Pasig City Council (1995–2004, 2013–2022); Vice Mayor of Pasig (2004–2013)	

=== Sri Lanka ===
Actor-politician	Acting career	Political party	Political career	Source
Vijaya Kumaratunga		Sri Lanka Mahajana Party	Founder	
Rohitha Abeygunawardena			MP, Cabinet Minister	
Anarkali Akarsha			Provincial Councillor	
Gerald Camilo III			MP, Deputy Speaker	
T. B. Ekanayake			MP, Cabinet Minister	
Gamini Fonseka	Actor, filmmaker		Governor of North Eastern Province	
Malini Fonseka			MP	
T. B. Ilangaratne			MP, Cabinet Minister	
Jeewan Kumaranatunga			MP, Cabinet Minister	
Geetha Kumarasinghe			Provincial Councillor	
N. M. Perera	Sri Lanka's first star		MP, Cabinet Minister	
Mahinda Rajapaksa			President	
Ranjan Ramanayake			MP	
Upeksha Swarnamali			MP	
Uddika Premarathna			MP	

=== Thailand ===
Actor-politician	Acting career	Political party	Political career	Source
Kukrit Pramoj	National Artist, actor	None	President of the National Legislative Assembly (1973–1974)	
Kukrit Pramoj	National Artist, actor	Social Action Party	Prime Minister (1975–1976)	
Suthep Wongkamhaeng	National artist, actor, singer, film director	New Force Party	Member of the House of Representatives (1979–1983)	
Suthep Wongkamhaeng	National artist, actor, singer, film director	Palang Dharma Party	Member of the House of Representatives (1988–1991)	
Seri Wongmontha	Actor, musician, journalist, film director	Independent	Deputy-governor candidate in the 1990 Bangkok gubernatorial election	
Arisman Pongruangrong	Singer, actor	Palang Dharma Party	Member of the House of Representatives (1995–1996)	
Arisman Pongruangrong	Singer, actor	Palang Dharma Party	Candidate in the 1996 Thai general election in Bangkok	
Arisman Pongruangrong	Singer, actor	Thai Rak Thai Party	Member of the House of Representatives (2005–2006)	
Danuporn Punnakant	Actor, television presenter	Thai Rak Thai Party	Candidate in the 2005 Thai general election in Bangkok	
Danuporn Punnakant	Actor, television presenter	Thai Rak Thai Party	Deputy government spokesperson (2005–2006)	
Danuporn Punnakant	Actor, television presenter	Thai Rak Thai Party	Candidate in the 2006 Thai general election in Bangkok	
Danuporn Punnakant	Actor, television presenter	People's Power Party	Member of the House of Representatives (2007–2011)	
Danuporn Punnakant	Actor, television presenter	Pheu Thai Party	Member of the House of Representatives (2007–2011)	
Nattaya Benjasiriwan	Actress	Democrat Party	Candidate in the 2005 Thai general election in Bangkok	
Nattaya Benjasiriwan	Actress	Democrat Party	Member of the House of Representatives (2007–2014)	
Yuranunt Pamornmontri	Actor, singer, television presenter	Thai Rak Thai Party	Member of the House of Representatives (2005–2006)	
Yuranunt Pamornmontri	Actor, singer, television presenter	People's Power Party	Candidate in the 2007 Thai general election in Bangkok	
Yuranunt Pamornmontri	Actor, singer, television presenter	Pheu Thai Party	Candidate in the 2009 Bangkok gubernatorial election	
Yuranunt Pamornmontri	Actor, singer, television presenter	Pheu Thai Party	Member of the House of Representatives (2011–2013)	
Leelavadee Vajropala	1st Runner-Up Miss Thailand 1985, Thai representative at Miss Asia Pacific International 1985, Actress, Singer	Thai Citizen Party	Candidate in the 2006 Thai general election in Bangkok	
Leelavadee Vajropala	1st Runner-Up Miss Thailand 1985, Thai representative at Miss Asia Pacific International 1985, Actress, Singer	People's Power Party	Candidate in the 2007 Thai general election in Bangkok	
Leelavadee Vajropala	1st Runner-Up Miss Thailand 1985, Thai representative at Miss Asia Pacific International 1985, Actress, Singer	Pheu Thai Party	Member of the House of Representatives (2011–2013)	
Leelavadee Vajropala	1st Runner-Up Miss Thailand 1985, Thai representative at Miss Asia Pacific International 1985, Actress, Singer	Pheu Thai Party	Candidate in the 2019 Thai general election in Bangkok	
Sombat Metanee	National artist, actor, film director	None	Member of the Senate (2006)	
Sombat Metanee	National artist, actor, film director	None	Member of the National Legislative Assembly (2006–2007)	
Krungsriwilai Sutinpeuk	Actor	People's Power Party	Member of the House of Representatives (2007–2011)	
Krungsriwilai Sutinpeuk	Actor	Pheu Thai Party	Member of the House of Representatives (2007–2011)	
Krungsriwilai Sutinpeuk	Actor	Bhumjaithai Party	Member of the House of Representatives (2007–2011)	
Krungsriwilai Sutinpeuk	Actor	Bhumjaithai Party	Candidate in the 2011 Thai general election in Samut Prakan	
Krungsriwilai Sutinpeuk	Actor	Palang Pracharath Party	Member of the House of Representatives (2019–2020)	
Nattakorn Devakula	Journalist, television presenter, actor, singer	Independent	Candidate in the 2009 Bangkok gubernatorial election	
Songkran Tejanarong	Actor, model	None	Spokesman of the Ministry of Information and Communication Technology (2011–2014)	
Tanwarin Sukkhapisit	Actor, film director	Future Forward Party	Member of the House of Representatives (2019–2020)	
Tanwarin Sukkhapisit	Actor, film director	Move Forward Party	Member of the House of Representatives (2019–2020)	
Wayo Assawarungruang	Actor, singer, television presenter	Future Forward Party	Member of the House of Representatives (2019–)	
Wayo Assawarungruang	Actor, singer, television presenter	Move Forward Party	Member of the House of Representatives (2019–)	
Wanchana Sawatdee	Actor	None	Deputy Spokesman of the Ministry of Defence (2020–)	
Karoonpon Tieansuwan	Actor, television presenter	Move Forward Party	Candidate in the 2022 Thai special general election in Bangkok	
Tankhun Jitt-itsara	Actor, television presenter	Democrat Party	Member of the House of Representatives (2013)	
Sakaojai Poonsawat	Actress, television presenter	Pheu Thai Party	Candidate in the 2023 Thai general election in Bangkok	

== Africa ==
=== Nigeria ===
Actor-politician	Acting career	Political party	Political career	Source
Olusegun Obasanjo	Military officer, author, and former actor	People's Democratic Party	President of Nigeria (1999–2007)	
Richard Mofe-Damijo	Actor (Wedding Party, The Meeting)	People's Democratic Party	Commissioner for Culture and Tourism in Delta State (2009–2015)	
Desmond Elliot	Actor (The Wedding Party, Falling)	All Progressives Congress	Member of the Lagos State House of Assembly (2015–present)	
Funke Akindele	Actress (Jenifa, Omo Ghetto)	People's Democratic Party	Deputy governorship candidate in Lagos State (2023 elections)	
Kanayo O. Kanayo	Actor (Living in Bondage, Rituals)	People's Democratic Party	Aspirant for Member of the National Assembly (2019)	
Yul Edochie	Actor (The Billionaire, Royal Castle)	Democratic People’s Congress	Governorship candidate in Anambra State (2017 election)	

=== Ghana ===
Actor-politician	Acting career	Political party	Political career	Source
John Dumelo	Actor (The King's Bride, A Private Storm)	National Democratic Congress	Member of Parliament candidate for Ayawaso West Wuogon (2020)	
Kofi Annan	Diplomat, actor, author	N/A	United Nations Secretary-General (1997–2006)	

=== Uganda ===
Actor-politician	Acting career	Political party	Political career	Source
Bobi Wine	Musician and actor (Situka, Mukyamu)	National Unity Platform	Member of Parliament (2017–present), Presidential candidate (2021)	

=== South Africa ===
Actor-politician	Acting career	Political party	Political career	Source
Ronnie Kasrils	Actor (A Dry White Season)	South African Communist Party	Minister of Intelligence (2004–2008)	

== Oceania ==
=== Australia ===
Actor-politician	Acting career	Political party	Political career	Source
Angry Anderson	Musician and actor (Mad Max Beyond Thunderdome, Jesus Christ Superstar 1992)	National Party of Australia, Australian Liberty Alliance	Candidate for Throsby in 2013 and a New South Wales Senate seat in 2016	
Liddy Clarke	Actress (Prisoner, Home and Away, Fire)	Australian Labor Party	Member of the Queensland Legislative Assembly for Clayfield (2001–2006)	
Derryn Hinch	Journalist and actor (The Rocky Horror Show 2008, The Colour of Darkness)	Derryn Hinch's Justice Party	Member of the Australian Senate for Victoria (2016–2019)	
Scott Morrison	Child actor (Vicks TV advertisements)	Liberal Party of Australia	Prime Minister of Australia (2018–2022) and member for Cook (2007–2024)	
Terry Norris	Actor (Cop Shop, Innocence, The Chronicles of Narnia: The Voyage of the Dawn Treader)	Australian Labor Party	Member of the Victorian Legislative Assembly for Noble Park (1982–1985) and Dandenong (1985–1992)	
Di Smith	Actor and drama coach (A Country Practice, Puberty Blues)	Australian Labor Party	Candidate for Wentworth in 2013	
Bryan Wiseman	Actor (Home and Away)	United Australia Party	Withdrawn candidate for Cook in 2019	

=== New Zealand ===
Actor-politician	Acting career	Political party	Political career	Source
Rawiri Paratene	Actor (Whale Rider, The Insatiable Moon)	Green Party of Aotearoa New Zealand	Candidate for Maungakiekie in 2008	

== See also ==
- List of sportsperson-politicians
