= Toninho =

Toninho is a Portuguese diminutive nickname for Antônio or António in use in Portugal, Brazil, South Africa, Namibia, Mozambique and Angola. It is loosely equivalent to Little Tony in English.

== Nicknames ==
=== Football ===
- Toninho (footballer, born 1947), nickname of Antônio Pedro de Jesus, Brazilian football forward
- Toninho (footballer, born 1948), nickname of Antônio Dias dos Santos, Brazilian football defender
- Toninho (footballer, born 1965), nickname of Antônio Benedito da Silva, Brazilian footballer
- Toninho (footballer, born 1977), nickname of Antônio Bezerra Brandão, Brazilian footballer
- Toninho (footballer, born 1973), nickname of Antônio Marcos Tobias, Brazilian footballer
- Toninho Almeida, nickname of Antonio Gonzaga Almeida, (born 1950), Brazilian footballer
- Toninho Andrade, nickname of José Antônio Rabelo de Andrade (born 1964), Brazilian footballer and manager
- Toninho Cecílio, nickname of Antônio Jorge Cecílio Sobrinho (born 1967), Brazilian footballer and manager
- Toninho Cerezo, nickname of Antônio Carlos Cerezo, (born 1955), Brazilian footballer
- Toninho dos Santos (footballer, born 1965), nickname of Antonio Teodoro dos Santos, Brazilian footballer
- Toninho dos Santos (footballer, born 1980), nickname of António Pedro Pires dos Santos, Bissau-Guinean footballer
- Toninho Guerreiro, nickname of Antônio Ferreira (1942–1990), Brazilian footballer
- Toninho Moura, nickname of Antonio Moura Sanches, (born 1954) is a Brazilian footballer and football head coach
- Toninho Quintino, nickname of Antônio Fernandes Quintino, (born 1952), Brazilian footballer

=== Other ===
- Toninho, nickname of Antônio da Costa Santos (1952–2001), Brazilian politician
- Toninho do Diabo, nickname of Antônio Aparecido Firmino (born 1971), Brazilian religious leader
- Toninho Horta, nickname of Antônio Maurício Horta de Melo, (born 1948), Brazilian musician
- Toninho Wandscheer, nickname of Antonio Wandscheer (born 1950), Brazilian politician

== See also ==
- Antônio Carlos Magalhães sometimes known as Toninho Malvaldeza
