= Antonio Sanchez =

Anthony Sanchez, Antonio Sanchez or Tony Sanchez may refer to:

== Arts and entertainment ==
- Antonio Sanchez Araujo (1887–1946), Cuban painter
- Antonio Sánchez (drummer) (born 1971), Mexican drummer
- Antonio Sánchez Pecino (1908–1994), Spanish guitarist
- Antonio Sánchez (Puerto Rican host) (born 1961), Puerto Rican radio and television personality
- Antonio José Sánchez Mazuecos (born 1995), Spanish singer
- Tony Sanchez (photographer) (died 2000), English photographer
- Tony Sánchez-Ohlsson (born 1974), Spanish music producer

== Politics ==
- Antonio Sánchez de Bustamante y Sirven (1865–1951), Cuban politician and lawyer
- Antonio Sánchez Díaz de Rivera (born 1953), Mexican politician
- Antonio Sanchez (murderer) (1946–2021), Filipino mayor convicted of rape, homicide, and murder
- Tony Sanchez Jr. (born 1943), American businessman and former gubernatorial candidate

== Sports ==
- Antonio Sánchez (boxer) (1905–?), Spanish boxer
- Antonio Sánchez (footballer, born 1997), Spanish footballer
- Antonio Sánchez (footballer, born 2000), Mexican goalkeeper
- Antonio Sánchez Rendón (1954–2024), Mexican wrester known as El Signo
- Antonio Sánchez (sprinter) (born 1963), Spanish sprinter
- Antonio Sánchez Valdés (1914–2005), Spanish footballer known as Antón
- Toni Sánchez (born 1985), Spanish footballer
- Tony Sanchez (American football) (born 1974), American football coach
- Tony Sanchez (baseball) (born 1988), American baseball player

== Other ==
- Anthony Castillo Sanchez (1978–2023), American executed for the rape and murder of Juli Busken
