= Musician-turned-politician =

Musicians-turned-politicians are professional musicians who then become politicians. It is a subset of the celebrity politicians, just like the many actor-politicians. While many more musicians have supported political parties, causes or candidates, this article focuses specifically on musicians who became political candidates or significant members of political parties themselves.

Musicians not only often had great popularity already, they also were often seen as independent or a new voice compared to traditional poliicians or after a period of strife. An early example was Ignacy Jan Paderewski, classical composer and piano player, whose transition from musician to politician was described by classical-music.com as "[...] used his status to champion the cause of an independent Poland – as a performer, he was seen as standing apart from the various factions involved in Polish politics, plus enjoyed direct personal contact with big hitters including US president Woodrow Wilson." He became prime minister of Poland as an independent politician in 1919, after World War I.

== Notable examples ==
- Mikko Alatalo, member of the Parliament of Finland
- Susana Baca, minister in the government of Peru
- Rubén Blades, minister in the Panamanian government
- Sonny Bono, member of the United States House of Representatives
- Manno Charlemagne, mayor of Port-au-Prince
- Jimmie Davis, Governor of Louisiana
- Peter Garrett, minister in the Australian government
- Gilberto Gil, minister in the Brazilian government
- John Hall, member of the United States House of Representatives
- Paweł Kukiz, member of the Parliament of Poland
- Freddy Lim, member of the Legislative Yuan in Taiwan
- Michel Martelly, president of Haiti
- Youssou N'Dour, minister in the Senegalese government
- Ignacy Jan Paderewski, prime minister of Poland
- Ruslana, member of the Verkhovna Rada in Ukraine
- Shyne, Belizean opposition leader
- Bobi Wine, Uganda, leader of National Unity Platform
- Pete Wishart, Member of Parliament in the UK
