= Hacienda Barrancas =

Populated Place in Ponce, Puerto Rico

- Populated Place
- Location within Puerto Rico
- Coordinates: 18°02′09″N 66°35′29″W
- Commonwealth: Puerto Rico
- Municipality: Ponce
- Barrio: Machuelo Arriba
- Elevation: 131 ft (40 m)
- Source: 2010 Census
- Time zone: UTC−4 (AST)

Hacienda Barrancas (also called Finca Barrancas) is a populated place in the Machuelo Arriba Barrio in the municipality of Ponce, Puerto Rico.

== History ==
In May 2006 a preliminary study was done on the possibility of developing a 2300-unit housing development in Hacienda Barrancas.

== Notable people ==
- Antonio Correa Cotto, a famous outlaw
