= Anthony Hernandez (disambiguation) =

Anthony Hernandez (born 1993) is an American mixed martial artist.

Anthony Hernandez may also refer to:

- Anthony Hernandez (photographer) (born 1947), American photographer
- Anthony Hernandez (footballer, born 1995), Gibraltarian footballer
- Anthony Hernández (footballer, born 2001), Costa Rican footballer

== See also ==
- Tony Hernández (born 1978), Honduran drug trafficker
- Antonio Hernández (disambiguation)
