= Sebastian Schlüsselburg =

German politician (born 1983)

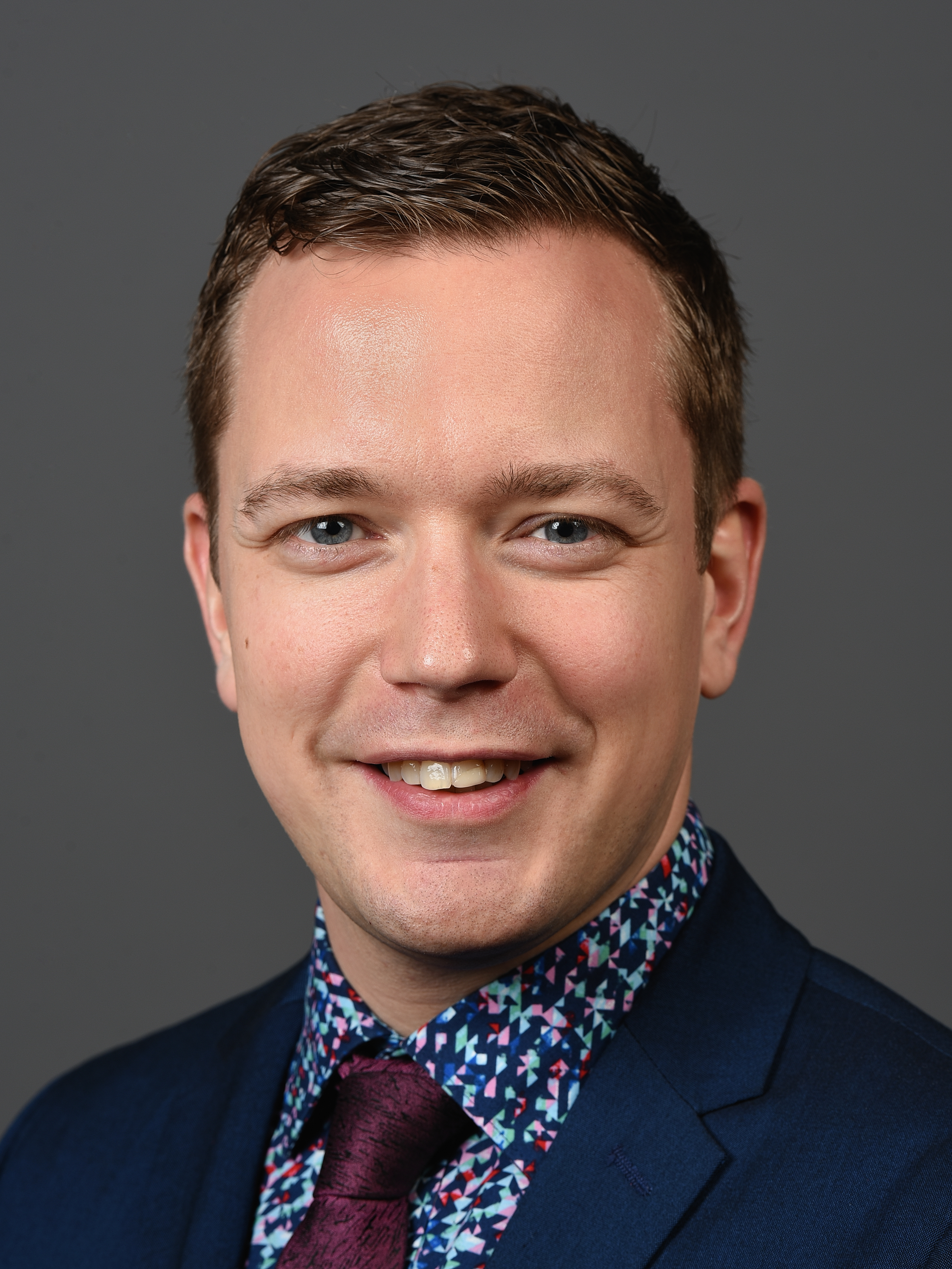
- Schlüsselburg in 2017

Member of the Abgeordnetenhaus of Berlin
- Incumbent
- Assumed office 27 October 2016
- Preceded by: Birgit Monteiro
- Constituency: Lichtenberg 4

Personal details
- Born: 7 February 1983 (age 43) Berlin
- Party: Social Democratic Party (since 2025)
- Other political affiliations: Party of Democratic Socialism (2005–2007); Die Linke (2007–2024)

Sebastian Schlüsselburg (born 7 February 1983 in Berlin) is a German politician serving as a member of the Abgeordnetenhaus of Berlin since 2016. He has been a member of the Social Democratic Party since 2025, and was a member of Die Linke until 2024.
