= Antonio Leonhardt =

German politician (born 1994)

Member of the Berlin House of Representatives
- Incumbent
- Assumed office 29 October 2026
- Preceded by: Sebastian Schlüsselburg
- Constituency: Lichtenberg 4

Personal details
- Born: 18 June 1994 (age 32)
- Party: Die Linke

Antonio Leonhardt (born 18 June 1994) is a German politician serving as a member of the Berlin House of Representatives since 2026. He has served as co-chairman of Die Linke in Lichtenberg since 2025.
