= Antonio Sanchez Araujo =

Spanish painter

Antonio Sánchez Araujo
- Born: 1887; Santa Lucía, Oriente Province, Cuba
- Died: 1946 (aged 58–59); Havana, Cuba
- Education: Academia Nacional de Bellas Artes San Alejandro; Académie Colarossi; Académie de la Grande Chaumière
- Occupations: Painter, educator
- Known for: Painting

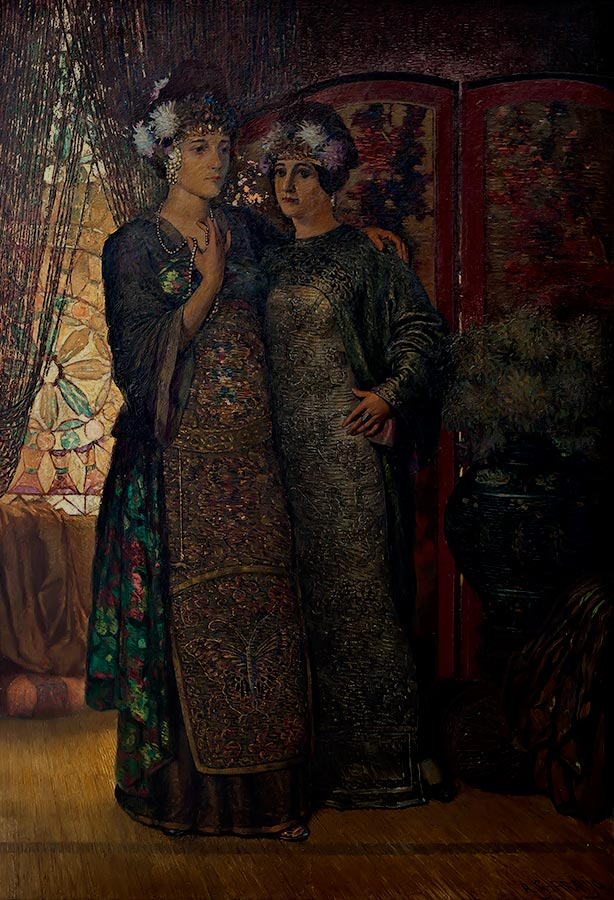
Portrait of two women, National Museum of Fine Arts of Cuba

Antonio Sánchez Araujo (1887–1946) was a Cuban costumbrista painter, during the early years of the Cuban republic. His paintings have been admired for their strong colorful and definite techniques. He was born in Santa Lucía, Oriente Province, in 1887. He formally started his drawing and painting studies at that institution located in Havana, Cuba.

== Early Education ==
From 1918, he continued his education in Spain, moved from Madrid to Barcelona, and lived one year in each city. Later, he moved to Paris and lived there for three years and completed his education in Europe, thanks to a 5-year scholarship granted by the Congress of the Republic of Cuba. In Paris, he took lessons for three years in the Colarossi and Grande Chaumiere Academies. Zavala (1992) reports that part of his training was to copy paintings of the Grand Masters at the Louvre Museum.

== Awards and recognitions ==
During his life he received several recognitions, including the following:

- 1918 - His work was displayed in the Palace of the Cuban Senate in at solo show;
- 1919 - “Solo” exhibition in Gayetanas Galleries in Barcelona;
- 1918 to 1928 - “Solo” exhibition at the Association of Painters and Sculptors from Havana;
- 1920 to 1921 - Participate in a collective show in the Autumn Salon of Madrid;
- 1921-“Solo” exhibition at the Modern Art Museum of Madrid;
- 1922- At The Bohemia Salon in Havana in 1922;
- 1925- In San Francisco, California in a collective show;
- 1926- His work was exhibited in Philadelphia, where he won a Bronze Medal prize with the artwork La Silla de Gibara or The Gibara’s Chair;
- 1930- He was also presented an exhibits in the city of Baltimore; Participated in a collective show, where he earned a gold medal;
- 1932- He participated in a collective show at the Lyceum Society from Havana, where he earned his second gold medal;
- 1940- Participation in the exhibit 300 Años de Arte en Cuba (300 Years of Art in Cuba), at the University of Havana.

== Later life ==
Sánchez Araujo served as the Director of the Free School of Fine Arts, from 1926 to 1929. At the same time, since 1926, he also served as a professor at San Alejandro Academy School.

Sánchez Araujo also had an administrative position at the San Alejandro Academy School as the Assistant Principal of the academy at the same time that he was teaching Drawing of the Ancient Greek. Antonio Sánchez Araujo, died in La Havana, Cuba on September 13, 1946.

== His Legacy ==
Antonio Sánchez Araujo cultivated, with special preference, the landscape and portrait genres, in addition to popular artworks.

In Miami, his work was presented in the Bacardi Gallery, in the Exhibit titled Pintura y Litografia Cubanas (Cuban Painting and Lithography), in 1988. The Museum of Arts and Science in Daytona Beach presented one of his works during 2005. “La Rumba”. Several Galleries in Florida and Mexico City also exhibited some of his work.
