= Roman Hryshchuk =

Ukrainian politician

- Роман Грищук
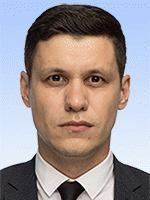
- Official portrait, 2019

People's Deputy of Ukraine
- Incumbent
- Assumed office 29 August 2019
- Preceded by: Dmytro Andriyevskyi
- Constituency: Kyiv, No. 222

Personal details
- Born: 27 August 1989 (age 36) Kyiv, Ukrainian SSR, Soviet Union
- Party: Servant of the People
- Occupation: actor; showman; comedian; politician

Roman Pavlovych Hryshchuk (Ukrainian: Роман Павлович Грищук; born 27 August 1989) is a Ukrainian politician, Member of the Ukrainian Parliament of the IX convocation; Member of the Verkhovna Rada Committee on Education, Science and Innovation. Former actor, head of the Mamahohotala studio, TV presenter.

In 2019, Forbes Ukraine named Roman Hryshchuk as one of the 30 Ukrainians who achieved success before turning 30.

== Biography ==
Roman Hryshchuk was born on 27 August 1989 in Kyiv.

He graduated from school with a gold medal. Twice he became the champion of Kyiv in the school KVN. He entered Igor Sikorsky Kyiv Polytechnic Institute, Faculty of Medicine and Engineering. During his student years, he had experience working with the Kvartal 95 Studio. In 2012, he founded the Mamahohotala studio.

After finishing his career in KVN, Roman Hryshchuk and his studio held two concerts in KPI. The second concert in the spring of 2013 was filmed for the then-new UFO TV channel. He created such media projects as Mamahohotala, How the Style Was Tempered, Maslyuky, and New Police.

Roman Hryshchuk is married. He has known the model, blogger, and actress Hanna Hres since university, where they performed together on the same stage in the KVK team KPI Team, and later in the comedy studio Mamakhohotala. After six years of relationship, in 2014, he proposed to her during a concert of the Mamakhyhotala studio. The couple welcomed a son, Tymofii, on 30 October 2019.

== Television career ==
- 2012–2022 – Mamahohotala – head of the studio, host of Mamahohotala Show (2014–2020)
- 2013–2015 – How the style was hardened (comedy youth series)
- 2015 – The New Police (online series) – co-producer, actor (played Roma, Marina's husband and partner)
- 2015 – Maslyuky (sketch show) – co-developer, actor
- 2018 – Curators (TV series) – co-author on the idea, co-author on the script
- 2019–2020 – Danger Zone (animated series) – co-producer

== Political career ==
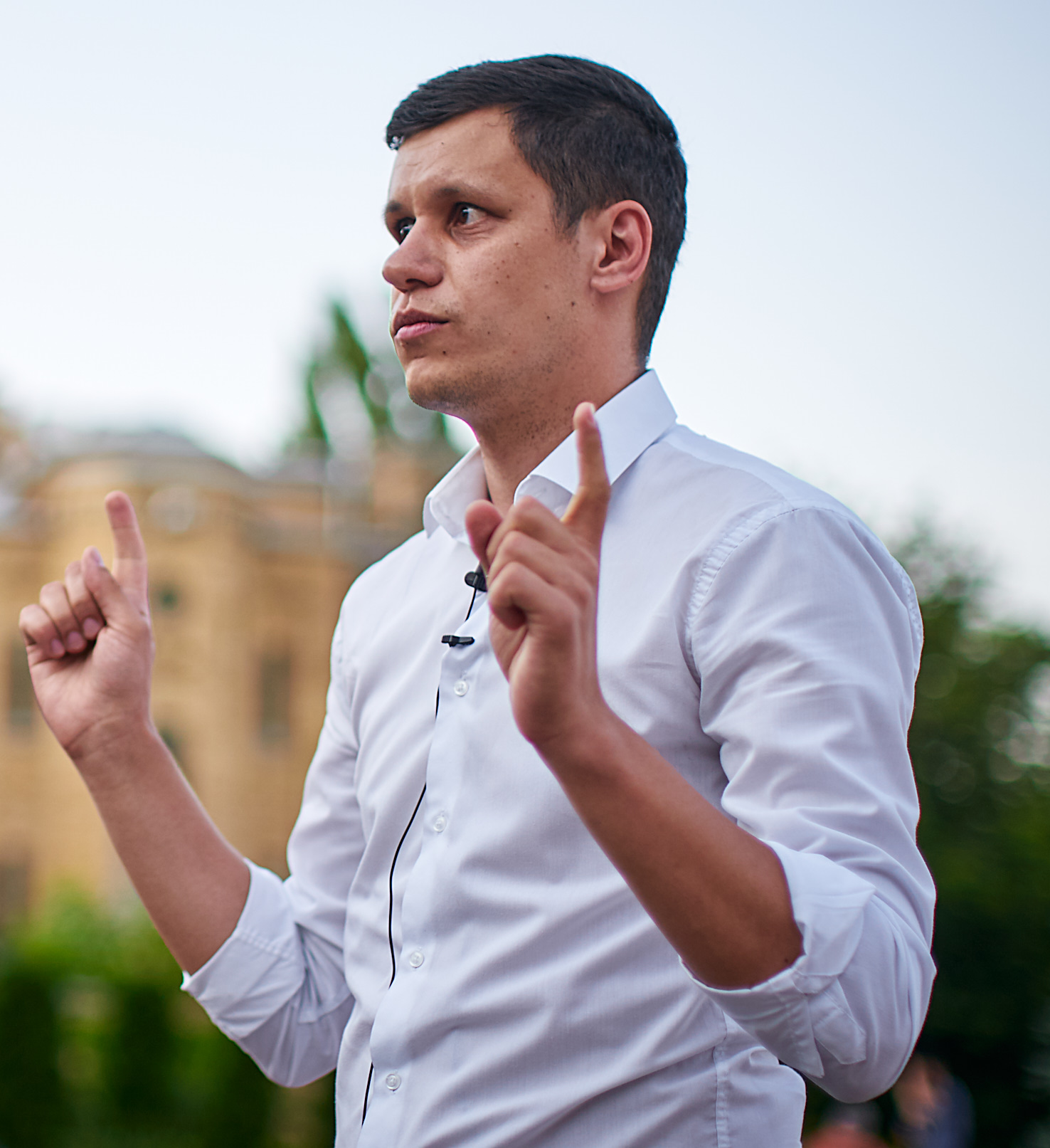
Hryshchuk campaigning in 2019

Roman Hryshchuk was a candidate for parliamentary elections as a representative of the Servant of the People party in the 2019 parliamentary elections and won in constituency 222 (part of Solomianskyi District, Kyiv). He is a member of the Verkhovna Rada Committee on Education, Science and Innovation. Moreover, he is a co-chair of the group on interparliamentary relations with the Republic of Turkey, co-chair of the group on interparliamentary relations with the Republic of Argentina[14]. Since December 2019, he has been a member of the Inter-Factional Association Humane Country, created at the initiative of UAnimals to promote humanistic values and protect animals from cruelty.

Roman Hryshchuk opposes the development of the land belonging to educational institutions. He has launched the resource zabudovazvo.com.ua to investigate the problem and to collect the information about the built-up land of universities. He appealed against the decision of the State Architectural and Construction Inspectorate to allow the construction of 14 high-rise buildings on the territory of the National Aviation University.

In January 2022, he paid an official visit to Turkey together with representatives of the MP group for interparliamentary relations with the Republic of Turkey.

Roman Hryshchuk is one of the initiators of a project that will allow young people from the temporarily occupied territories to adapt to living in the independent part of Ukraine. This project includes preparatory courses for children from TOT in 23 Ukrainian higher education institutions, free accommodation and scholarships, and the opportunity for those who has graduated from school in the occupied territory to apply to a university through the Crimea-Ukraine or Donbas-Ukraine educational centres.

At the end of 2021, he successfully completed the project on the restoration of the clock with the largest clock face in Kyiv which can be seen on the facade of the Institute of History of Ukraine of the National Academy of Sciences, located at 4 Hrushevskoho Street. In June 2024, he supported the initiative of the Solomyanski Kotyky foundation to install a memorial plaque and a bust at the building on Chornobylska Street, where the poet and dissident Vasyl Stus lived in Kyiv in recent years.

== Legislative practice ==
In May 2020, he was one of the initiators of a bill by the Servant of the People party that officially allowed indirect bribery of voters in the context of the coronavirus pandemic.

Roman Hryshchuk is engaged in reforming the space industry. He worked on the law No. 143-IX, which removed the state's monopoly on space. He is also a member of the provisional investigative commission into possible illegal actions of officials from the State Space Agency of Ukraine and space industry enterprises. Together with his colleagues, he prepared an amendment to the bill No. 2285-d to provide additional funding for education from gambling revenues. The amendment was supported in the second reading.

In 2021, he became one of the authors of bills No. 5498 and No. 5499 which provide for amendments to the law on public procurement, the Customs and Tax Codes, as well as exemptions from import duties and VAT on scientific instruments, equipment, reagents, samples, and consumables.
