= Antonio Landa =

Mexican footballer (born 1979)

Personal information
- Full name: Antonio Landa Guzmán
- Date of birth: 17 January 1979 (age 47)
- Place of birth: Tlapacoyan, Veracruz, Mexico
- Height: 1.76 m (5 ft 9 in)
- Position: Midfielder

Senior career*
Years	Team	Apps	(Gls)
2003	Atlético Yucatán	3	(0)
2003–2004	Inter Riviera Maya	14	(0)
2004–2005	Mérida	28	(3)
2006	Tiburones Rojos de Coatzacoalcos	13	(0)
2007	Puebla	10	(1)
2007	Tiburones Rojos de Coatzacoalcos	6	(0)
2008–2010	Monarcas Morelia	0	(0)
2008–2010	→ Mérida (loan)	40	(1)
- * Club domestic league appearances and goals

Antonio Landa Guzmán (born January 17, 1979) is a Mexican former professional footballer who played as a midfielder.

== Club career ==
Landa made his professional debut with Atlético Yucatán in January 2003 during a defeat to Lagartos de Tabasco in Primera División A. The club moved to Playa del Carmen ahead of the 2003–04 season and became Inter Riviera Maya. He spent one year there before the franchise was sold yet again. That offseason, he signed with another Primera División A side, Mérida, during the 2004 summer draft. He scored his first goal in the professional ranks on 22 January 2005, again playing against Lagartos de Tabasco. He would score two more times that season.

He played with Tiburones Rojos de Coatzacoalcos in 2006 before joining Puebla in January 2007, only to return to Coatzacoalcos that summer.

During the 2008 summer draft, he was acquired by Monarcas Morelia, and loaned out to Mérida, who had just recently become their filial team. After finishing first in their group, Mérida went on to win the Clausura 2009 liguilla. He played his final professional game on 10 April 2010 – a victory over Alacranes de Durango.

In 2018, he joined Cuervos de Conkal of the Primera Fuerza de Yucatán state league. Serving as captain in his first season, he led the Cuervos to the finals, where they lost to Deportivo Dzán in July 2019. He joined Deportivo Dzán the following season.

== Honours ==
=== Club ===
Mérida

- Primera División A: Clausura 2009
