= Antonio Della Rossa =

Austrian politician (born 1982)

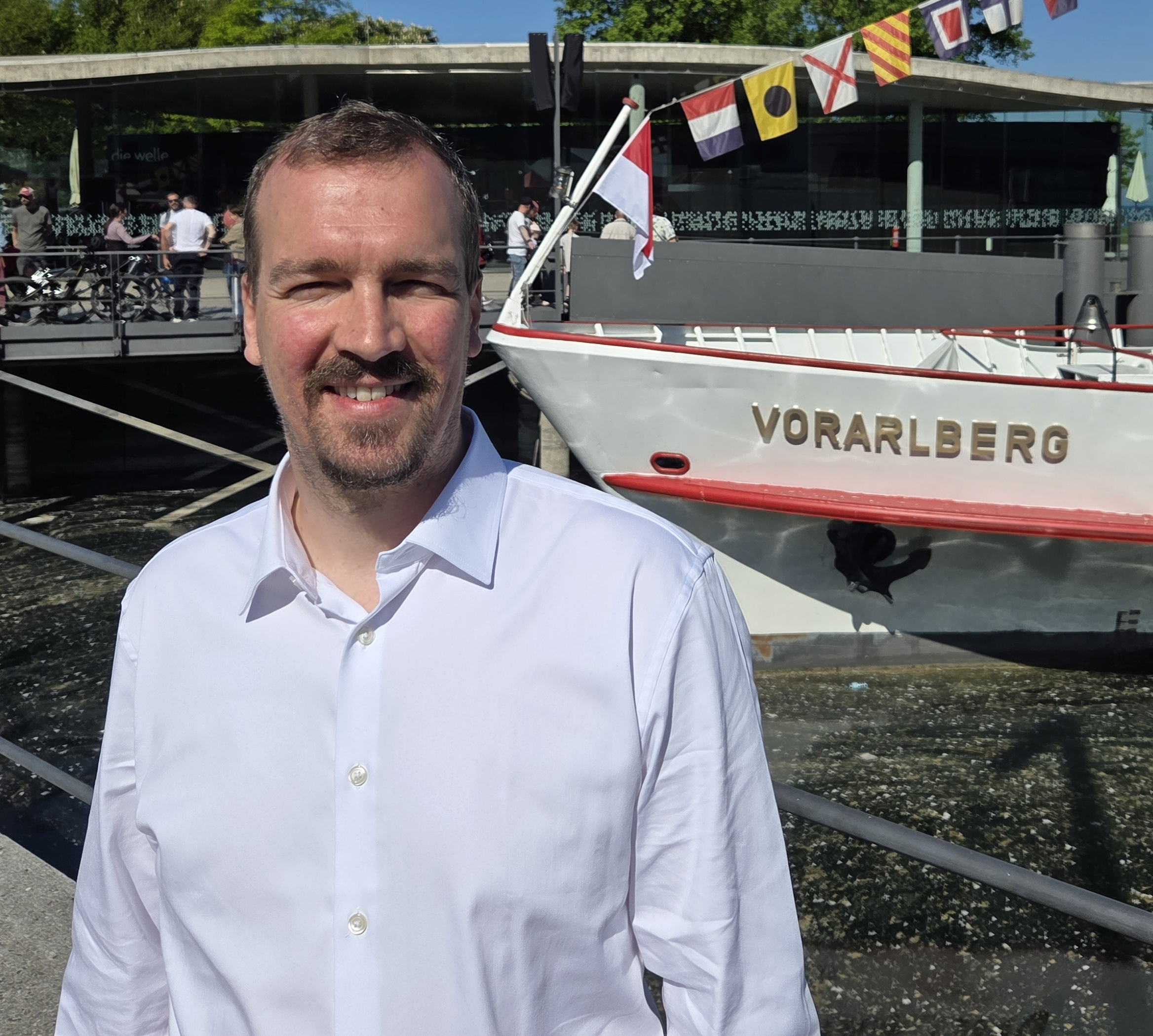
- Della Rossa in 2024

Member of the National Council
- Incumbent
- Assumed office 24 October 2024
- Constituency: Vorarlberg

Personal details
- Born: 15 January 1982 (age 44)
- Party: Social Democratic Party

Antonio Della Rossa (born 15 January 1982) is an Austrian politician of the Social Democratic Party serving as a member of the National Council since 2024. He has been a municipal councillor of Bludenz since 2015.
