= Toninho do Diabo =

- Born: Antônio Aparecido Firmino; 21 September 1971 (age 55); Jundiaí, São Paulo, Brazil
- Occupations: Actor and singer
- Political party: SD

Antônio Aparecido Firmino (born 21 September 1971), better known as Toninho do Diabo (Tom of the Devil) or Devil Tony, is an alleged Brazilian religious, who identifies himself as a disciple of the devil, and calls itself the Ambassador of Lucifer on Earth and is therefore considered by the media as one of the greatest leaders of Brazil Satanists.

He has participated in many television programmes and met with various religious, as Inri Cristo and Óscar González-Quevedo.

He is also a singer, songwriter, actor, screenwriter, producer and director of movies online, and carnival leader, being president of samba school Império do Vale do Sol (Empire of the Sun Valley)

He became famous, however, in the 2000s, when the video clip of one of his most famous songs, Brazilian Prophecies was presented in the defunct MTV show, Worst Clips of the World and was very successful. More known by the refrain "I put on fire" in the song, Tom makes a major criticism of various segments of society.

In 2014 general elections, he ran unsuccessfully for Federal Deputy for São Paulo by Solidarity (SD).

== Filmography ==
- King of hell (1994)
- King of hell II (1999)
- Attack of the killer tires (2000)
- King of hell III (2003)
- Devil's farm (2014)
- Cursed hospital (filming)

== See also ==
- Inri Cristo
- Óscar González-Quevedo
- Religion in Brazil
