= Antonio Hernández =

Antonio Hernández may refer to:

- Antonio Hernández (boxer), Mexican boxer
- Antonio Hernández (cyclist), Mexican cyclist
- Antonio Hernández (director), Spanish film director and screenwriter
- Antonio Hernández (footballer), Mexican footballer
- Antonio Hernández Arriaga, Mexican professional wrestler, known as Espectro I
- Antonio Hernández Gallegos, Mexican Roman Catholic bishop
- Antonio Hernández Mancha, Spanish politician
- Antonio Viana Hernandez, known as Anthony Alonzo, Filipino actor and singer

== See also ==
- Tony Hernández, Honduran convicted drug trafficker and politician
- Anthony Hernandez (disambiguation)
