= Óscar González-Quevedo =

Spanish-born Brazilian Jesuit priest (1930–2019)

The Reverend Óscar González-Quevedo SJ
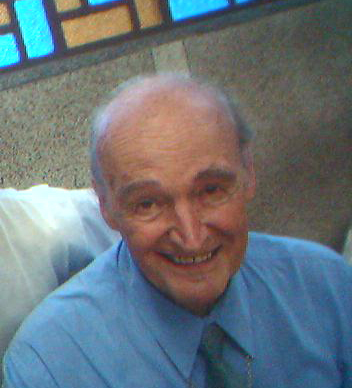
- Quevedo in 2006

Personal details
- Born: Óscar González-Quevedo Bruzón; December 15, 1930 Madrid, Spain
- Died: January 9, 2019 (aged 88) Belo Horizonte, Minas Gerais, Brazil
- Parents: Manuel González-Quevedo Monfort (father); Ángeles Bruzón (mother)
- Occupation: Catholic Priest

Óscar González-Quevedo Bruzón SJ (15 December 1930 – 9 January 2019) was a Spanish-born Brazilian Jesuit priest. He was an investigator in the field of parapsychology.

== Life ==
Quevedo was born in Madrid in a deeply Catholic family, with uncles and cousins ordained priests and a sister and a first cousin, nuns. His first cousin, Teresita González Quevedo, a Carmelite sister, is on her way to beatification (a step before becoming a saint) in the Catholic Church.

When González Quevedo was a child, an uncle, Horatio, from Gibraltar was trying to influence him with Allan Kardec's literature. At the time, Óscar and his mother Ángeles Bruzon were exiled in Gibraltar. They were escaping the Spanish Communist Republic. His father, a Catholic, was killed by Republicans. As he was very curious and liked to read, he began to study those “amazing phenomena”, resulting in all sorts of questions and a powerful drive to study more. Several years later, conversations with the nephew changed his uncle’s beliefs in Spiritism. He has surviving family in Gibraltar as his mother was Gibraltarian.

Early in his life, he discovered his vocation to become a priest, while attending a Jesuit secondary school in Vigo, Spain.

He was ordained as a priest in 1961. His superior sent him to Brazil to research superstitions, religious sects, and parapsychological phenomena. His background included knowledge of illusionism and magic, which he used to investigate claims of paranormal phenomena.

He was the founder and director of the Latin American Center of Parapsychology, located in São Paulo, Brazil, where he worked on a daily basis, except while traveling domestically or throughout the world, teaching and conducting all sorts of conferences and workshops on parapsychology. González Quevedo read Latin, Greek, Hebrew, English, French and Italian, besides being fluent in Spanish and Portuguese.

== Books ==
- O que é parapsicologia
- A face Oculta da Mente
- As Forças Físicas da Mente
- O Poder da mente na cura e na doença
- Antes que os demônios voltem, Loyola
- Os Espíritos e os Fenômenos Parafísicos
- Há provas de que os mortos agem?
- Identificação dos mortos?
- As provas da ciência
- Palavra de Iahweh
- Nossa Senhora de Guadalupe
- Milagres - A Ciência Confirma a Fé
- Os Milagres e a Ciência
- Milagres na história da Igreja
