= Mapuana Antonio =

American public health academic

- Born: Wahiawa, Hawaii, U.S.
- Education: Washington State University; University of Hawaiʻi at Mānoa
- Scientific career
- Fields: Public health, Native Hawaiian health
- Workplaces: University of Hawaiʻi at Mānoa

Mapuana C. K. Antonio is a Native Hawaiian public health academic specializing in Native Hawaiian and indigenous health. She is the inaugural Queen Liliʻuokalani Distinguished Professor in Native Hawaiian Culture at the University of Hawaiʻi at Mānoa. She heads the Native Hawaiian and indigenous health program in its office of public health studies.

== Life ==
Antonio was born and raised in Wahiawa, Hawaii in a Native Hawaiian family. She graduated with honors with a B.S. in psychology with a minor in biology from Washington State University (WSU). She completed a M.A. in counseling psychology from the WSU college of education. Antonio earned a Dr.PH. from the office of public health studies at the University of Hawaiʻi at Mānoa (UH Mānoa). Her 2017 dissertation was titled An exploration of resilience among Native Hawaiians. Kathryn L. Braun was her dissertation chair.

Antonio is a scholar on the health and well-being of Native Hawaiians and indigenous peoples. In 2018, she became an assistant professor in the department of human nutrition, food and animal sciences, in the college of tropical agriculture and human resources and the office of public health studies in the Myron B. Thompson School of Social Work at the UH Mānoa. Antonio is head of the Native Hawaiian and indigenous health program in the office of public health studies in the Thompson School. By 2023, she as an associate professor. In August 2023, she was appointed to the inaugural endowed Queen Liliʻuokalani Distinguished Professorship in Native Hawaiian Culture.
