= Toninho dos Santos (footballer, born 1980) =

Bissau Guinean footballer

Antonio dos Santos
Personal information
- Full name: António Pedro Pires dos Santos
- Date of birth: 12 June 1980 (age 46)
- Place of birth: Bissau, Guinea Bissau
- Height: 1.62 m (5 ft 4 in)
- Position: Leftback

Youth career
- 1990–1999: Boavista

Senior career*
Years	Team	Apps	(Gls)
1999–2001	Leixões	36	(0)
2001–2002	Pedras Rubras	3	(1)
2002–2003	Sanjoanense	35	(3)
2003–2004	Salgueiros	4	(0)
2004–2005	União de Lamas	12	(1)
2008–2009	Wakefield		

International career
2003	Guinea Bissau	2	(0)
- * Club domestic league appearances and goals

António "Toninho" Pedro Pires dos Santos (born 12 June 1980) is a Bissau Guinean former footballer who played as a left-back for the Guinea Bissau national team.

== International career ==
Dos Santos made two appearances with the Guinea Bissau national team. He debuted in a 2–1 2006 FIFA World Cup qualification loss to Mali, on 10 October 2003.
