= Antonio Correa Cotto =

Puerto Rican murderer

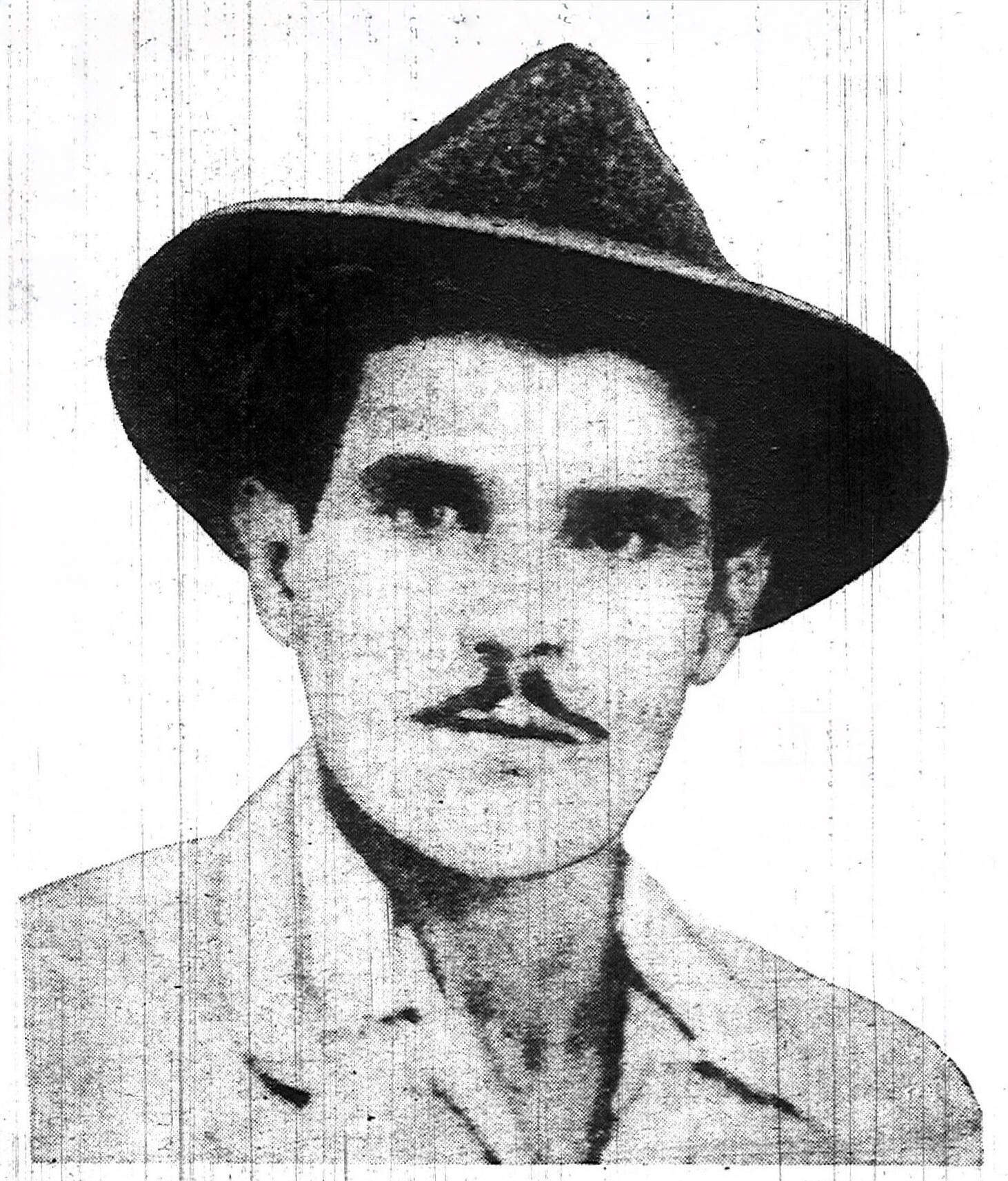
- Image of Correa Cotto published in El Imparcial on May 13, 1952
- Born: November 24, 1916; Ponce, Puerto Rico
- Died: May 16, 1952 (aged 35); Ponce, Puerto Rico
- Cause of death: Gunshot wounds
- Occupation: Outlaw
- Spouse: Rosa Maria Torres Garay

Antonio Correa Cotto (November 24, 1916 – May 16, 1952) was a Puerto Rican murderer. He was convicted of murdering two people in 1950, and escaped from prison later that year. Shortly after his escape, he killed ten more people. Correa Cotto was killed by police in May 1952.

== Early years ==
Correa Cotto was born in Ponce, Puerto Rico, on November 24, 1916. His parents were Raimundo Correa Martínez and Angela Coto García. He began his criminal career as a child and, by the time he was a teenager, he had amassed a long criminal police record.

== Criminal career ==
On January 25, 1950, Correa Cotto entered the Colon residence in the Villa Olga sector of Machuelo Abajo in Ponce and stabbed 33-year-old Rafael Parissi Vazquez 22 times and 69-year-old Rafaela Morales Melendez three times. Both died at the scene. Additionally, Luisa Colon Miranda, Laureana Cruz, and Pablo Vazquez were seriously injured. It was his intent to kill everyone present in the home. A police officer who later attempted to arrest him was also injured. He was convicted of the two murders in Ponce and was sentenced to two life sentences in the state penitentiary. At the time of his sentencing, Correa Cotto swore that he would get even with those who testified against him and whom he deemed responsible for his current situation, including municipal judge Pedro Muñiz Ramos and district judge Lorenzo Lagarda Garces.

== Escape and death ==
On October 28, 1950, inmates Pedro Benejan Alvarez, Gregorio Lebron Martinez, and Antonio Rivera Rodriguez instigated a prison revolt where two of the prison guards died and several others were injured. Having raided the armory, they armed themselves with guns and ammunition. One hundred eleven inmates escaped during the revolt, including Correa Cotto. Two days later, 68 of the inmates were still on the loose. Correa Cotto was deemed among the most dangerous of the inmates to escape. Shortly thereafter, he made his way to a sector of Ponce called "Villa Olga", where he murdered 10 people.

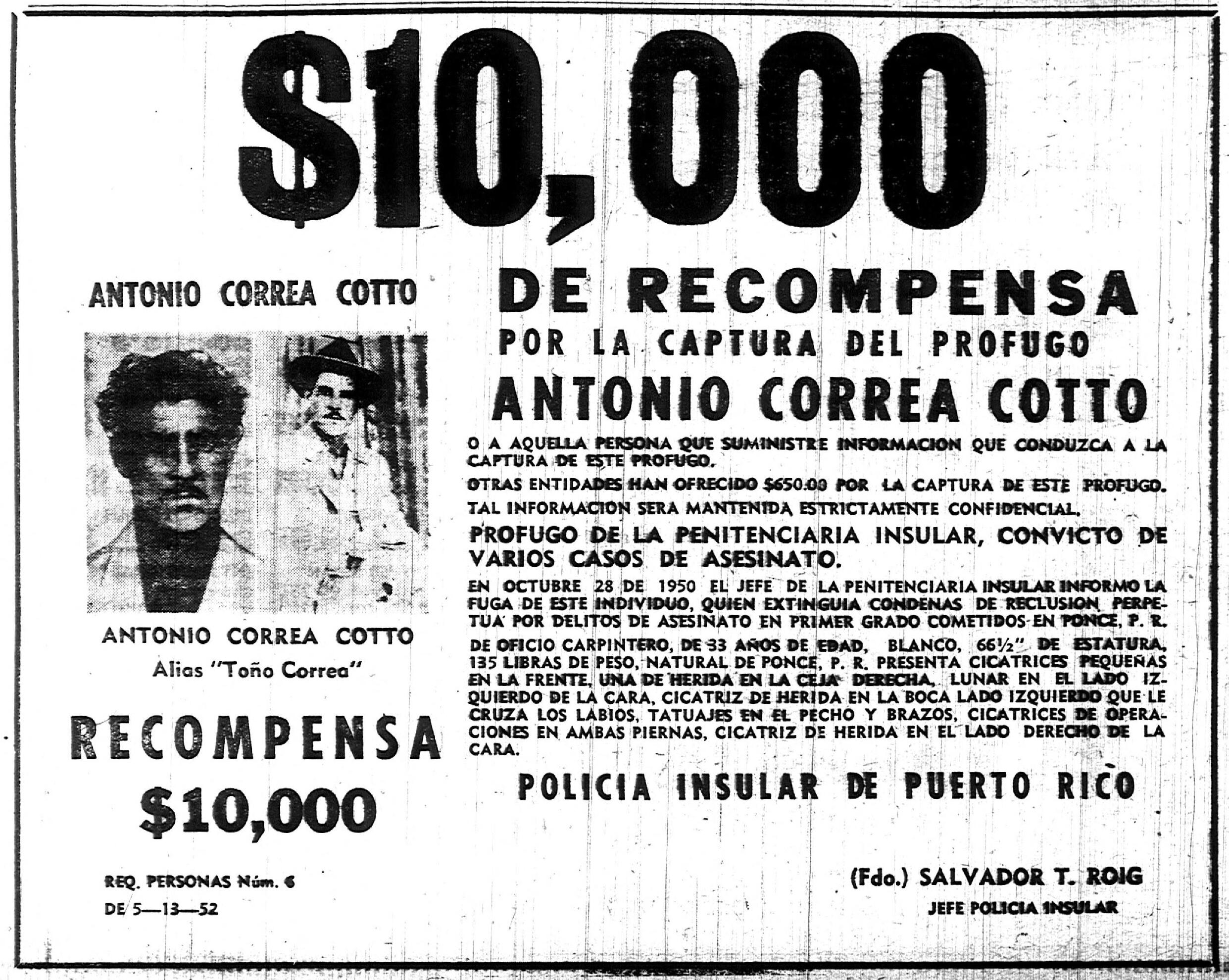
As advertised in El Imparcial in May 1952, authorities offered a $10,000 award for the capture of Correa Cotto.

The authorities organized what was then the largest manhunt in the history of the island. They placed a bounty on his head of $10,000 ($133,817 in 2025 dollars), either dead or alive, which was a first in the crime annals of Puerto Rico. The police detained over 70 friends and family members for questioning. On May 16, 1952, the police was alerted that Correa Cotto was living on a farm in Hacienda Barrancas on the outskirts of the City of Ponce. When the police arrived, they called on him to surrender, but he responded by firing his gun. The police set fire to the sugar cane fields which surrounded Correa Cotto's hideout. He came out firing a gun in one hand and held a machete in the other. Under the orders of Captain Luis M. Pérez, the police opened fire on Correa Cotto, killing him. Correa Cotto was buried in Ponce's Cementerio Civil de Ponce.

== In popular culture ==
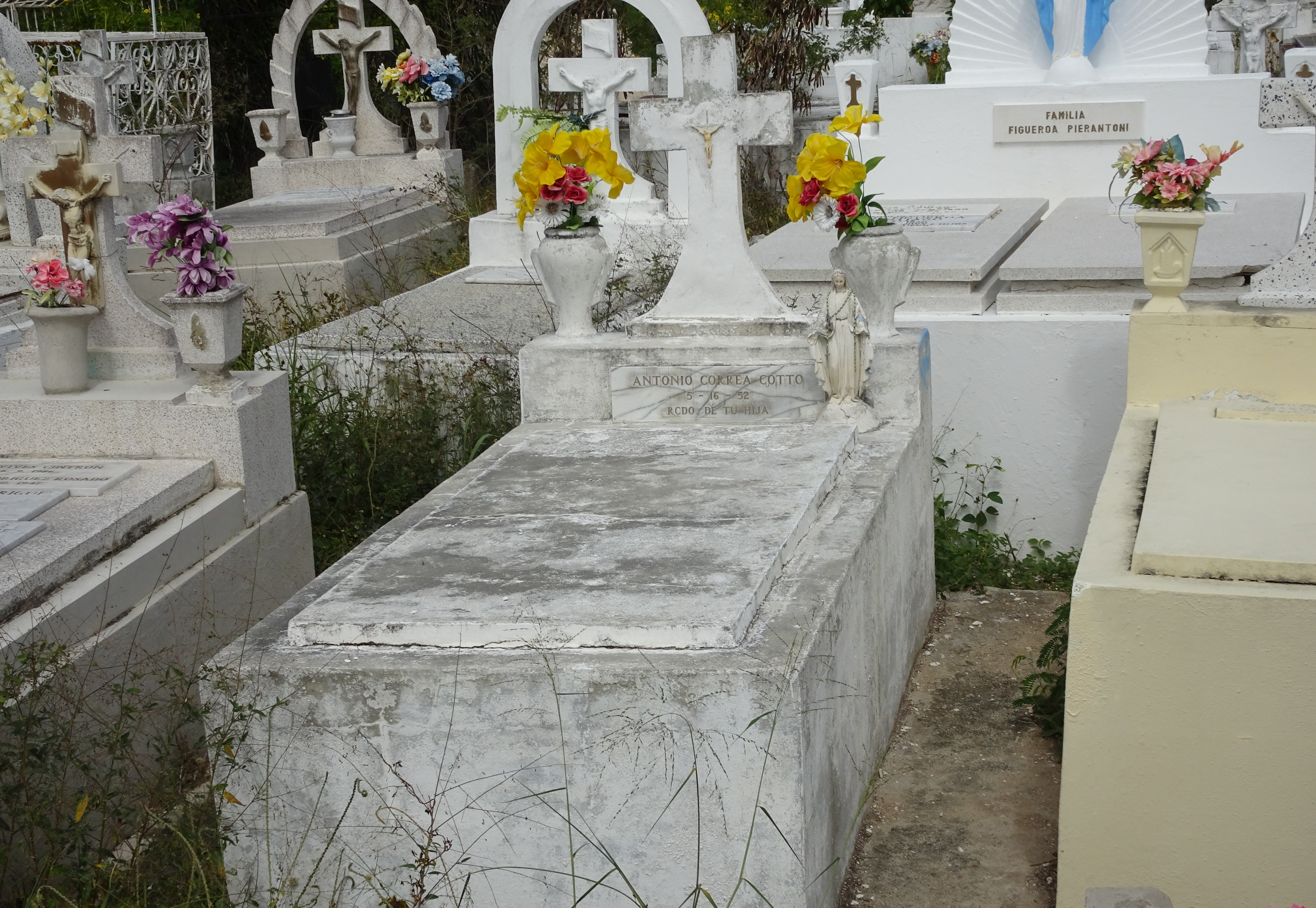
Grave of Correa Cotto at Cementerio Civil de Ponce

Three movies have been made about the life of Correa Cotto. These include the movie Correa Cotto: Así me Llaman (Correa Cotto: That's what they call me) (1968), produced by Antony Felton, which showed the popular impact that Correa Cotto's crimes had on the Puerto Rican society of the 1950s. In La Venganza de Correa Cotto (The Vengeance of Correa Cotto) (1969), produced and directed by Jeronimo Mitchel and Anthony Felton with the participation of Miguel Ángel Álvarez and Lucy Boscana, the producers attempt to look into the human and intimate side of Correa Cotto.

== See also ==
- List of Puerto Ricans
