= Antonio Sánchez (footballer, born 2000) =

Mexican footballer (born 2000)

Personal information
- Full name: Antonio Sánchez Montes De Oca
- Date of birth: 22 January 2000 (age 26)
- Place of birth: Tuxtla Gutiérrez, Chiapas, Mexico
- Height: 1.85 m (6 ft 1 in)
- Position: Goalkeeper

Team information
- Current team: Atlas
- Number: 22

Youth career
- 2015–2017: Chiapas
- 2017–2023: Atlas

Senior career*
Years	Team	Apps	(Gls)
2023–	Atlas	3	(0)
2023–2024	→ UAT (loan)	25	(0)
- * Club domestic league appearances and goals as of 25 July 2026

Antonio Sánchez Montes De Oca (born 22 January 2000) is a Mexican professional footballer who plays as a goalkeeper for Liga MX side Atlas.

== Career ==
In 2023, Sánchez started his career in Atlas. In 2023, he was loaned to UAT.

== Career statistics ==
=== Club ===
As of 25 July 2026

Appearances and goals by club, season and competition
Club	Season	League			Cup		Continental		Other		Total	
Club	Season	Division	Apps	Goals	Apps	Goals	Apps	Goals	Apps	Goals	Apps	Goals
Atlas	2025–26	Liga MX	2	0	—		—		1 (Note: Appearances in Leagues Cup)	0	2	0
Atlas	2026–27	Liga MX	1	0	—		—		—		1	0
Atlas	Total		3	0	—		—		1	0	4	0
UAT (loan)	2023–24	Liga de Expansión MX	25	0	—		—		—		25	0
Career total			28	0	0	0	0	0	1	0	29	0
