= Antonio Johnson =

Antonio Johnson may refer to:

- Antonio Johnson (defensive tackle) (born 1984), American football player
- Antonio Johnson (defensive back) (born 2001), American football player
