= Antonio Escobar =

Antonio Escobar may refer to:

- Antonio Escobar (born 1976), Spanish music producer and composer (maternal surname Núñez).
- Antonio Escobar Huertas (1879–1940), Spanish general.
- Antonio Escobar y Mendoza (1589–1669), Spanish ethicist.
