= Lichtenberg 4 =

State electoral district of Germany

- Electoral district for the Berlin House of Representatives
- Lichtenberg 4 in 2026
- District: Lichtenberg
- Electorate: 33,474 (2026)

Current electoral district
- Party: The Left
- Member: Antonio Leonhardt

Lichtenberg 4 is an electoral constituency (German: Wahlkreis) represented in the House of Representatives of Berlin. It elects one member via first-past-the-post voting.

== Geography ==
The constituency comprises the areas south of Karl-Lade-Straße, Paul-Junius-Straße, Herzbergstraße, Stadtpark, Buchberger Straße, and Victoriastadt. It is entirely within the borough of Lichtenberg.

There were 33,474 eligible voters in 2026.

== Members ==
Election	Member	Party	%
2006	Stefanie Schulze	The Left	40.3
2011	Birgit Monteiro	SPD	32.8
2016	Sebastian Schlüsselburg	The Left	32.8
2021	Sebastian Schlüsselburg	The Left	29.4
2023	Sebastian Schlüsselburg	The Left	27.2
2026	Antonio Leonhardt	The Left	38.4

== Election results ==
=== 2026 election ===
State election (2026): Lichtenberg 4
Notes:	Blue background denotes the winner of the electorate vote. Pink background denotes a candidate elected from their party list. Yellow background denotes an electorate win by a list member, or other incumbent. A ✓ or ✗ denotes status of any incumbent, win or lose respectively.						
Party	Candidate	Votes	%	±%	Party votes	%	±%
Left	Antonio Leonhardt	9,212	38.4	▲11.1	8,712	36.0	▲14.1
AfD	Buckhard Knoll	4,215	17.5	▲6.6	4,323	17.9	▲7.2
CDU	Lennart Birkenthal	2,829	11.8	▼7.3	2,548	10.5	▼7.4
SPD	Tamara Lüdke	2,572	10.7	▼7.9	2,298	9.5	▼7.3
Greens	Philipp Ahrens	2,381	9.9	▼6.7	2,779	11.5	▼5.8
BSW	Jürgen Hofmann	1,192	5.0		1,477	6.1	
APT	Florian Schmeding	744	3.1	▼2.2	663	2.7	▼0.8
Volt	Marta Mendec	479	2.0		492	2.0	▲1.0
FDP	Batuhan Temiz	394	1.6		385	1.6	▼1.4
PARTEI					240	1.0	▼1.3
PdF					87	0.4	
DKP					63	0.3	▼0.1
HEIMAT					39	0.2	▲0.1
du.					32	0.1	▼0.1
ÖDP					25	0.1	Steady
SGP					16	0.1	Steady
Informal votes		475			314		
Total valid votes		24,018			24,179		
Turnout		24,493	73.2	▲12.8			
Left hold	Majority	4,997	20.9	▼12.8			

=== 2023 repeat election ===
Changes denoted below for the 2023 election are compared to the 2016 election, as the 2021 election was declared invalid.

State election (2023): Lichtenberg 4
Notes:	Blue background denotes the winner of the electorate vote. Pink background denotes a candidate elected from their party list. Yellow background denotes an electorate win by a list member, or other incumbent. A ✓ or ✗ denotes status of any incumbent, win or lose respectively.						
Party	Candidate	Votes	%	±%	Party votes	%	±%
Left	✓ Sebastian Schlüsselburg	5,399	27.2	▼5.6	4,355	21.9	▼7.6
CDU	Michael Moll	3,783	19.1	▲8.8	3,572	18.0	▲8.6
SPD	Tamara Lüdke	3,696	18.6	▼3.3	3,346	16.8	▼3.1
Greens	Fadime Topaç	3,296	16.6	▲6.6	3,443	17.3	▲7.6
AfD	Irina Pierenz	2,172	11.0	▼6.0	2,127	10.7	▼5.5
APT	Ricarda Scholz	1,051	5.3		706	3.6	▲1.1
FDP					599	3.0	Steady
PARTEI					449	2.3	▼0.6
Volt					204	1.0	
Gray Panthers					108	0.5	▼0.6
FW	Armin Donat	226	1.1		81	0.4	
dieBasis	Marco Schneidhuber	176	0.9		106	0.5	
The Grays					104	0.5	
Pirates					94	0.5	▼1.7
Verjüngungsforschung					81	0.4	▼0.4
Klimaliste					79	0.4	
Mieterpartei					73	0.4	
DKP					65	0.3	▼0.2
du.					51	0.3	
Team Todenhöfer					47	0.2	
Humanists					43	0.2	
Bergpartei, die ÜberPartei					23	0.1	
Bildet Berlin!					23	0.1	
SGP					22	0.1	▼0.2
NPD					21	0.1	▼0.7
The Pinks/Alliance 21					19	0.1	
ÖDP					18	0.1	
LKR	Marco Warnest	26	0.1		10	0.1	▼0.4
BüSo					9	0.0	▼0.1
Informal votes		214			165		
Total valid votes		19,825			19,878		
Turnout		20,055	60.3	▼3.3			
Left hold	Majority	1,616	8.1				

== See also ==
- Politics of Berlin
- House of Representatives of Berlin
