= Antonio Cifaldi =

Italian politician (1899–1967)

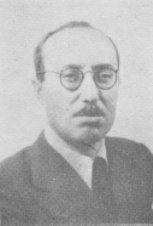
Antonio Cifaldi

Antonio Cifaldi (7 October 1899 – 27 June 1967) was an Italian politician who served as Mayor of Benevento (1944–1945), member of the Constituent Assembly (1946–1948), Deputy (1948–1953) and Undersecretary of State (1945–1946, 1947–1950).
