= Antonio Williams =

Antonio Williams may refer to:

- Antonio Williams (seaman) (1825–1908), American naval officer
- Antonio Williams (basketball) (born 1997), American basketball player
- Antonio Williams (running back) (born 1997), American football player
- Antonio Williams (wide receiver) (born 2004), American football player

== See also ==
- William Antonio (born 1975), Filipino-American basketball player
- Antoni Williams (1939–2016), New Zealand pop singer
