= MV Antonios =

A number of motor vessels were named Antonios or similarly, including:

- MV Antonios (1944), a Greek coaster in service 1954–57
- MV Antonios P, a Greek coaster in service 1963–69
