= Carlo Antonio Buffagnotti =

Italian painter

Carlo Antonio Buffagnotti was an Italian painter of the late-Baroque, active as a painter of perspective and theatrical decorations at Bologna and Genoa about 1690. He engraved a series of architectural subjects, and decorations for the theatre, after Francesco Galli Bibiena, and others after Marcantonio Chiarini.
