= Thor (disambiguation) =

Thor is a Germanic god associated with thunder.

Thor may also refer to:

== Arts and entertainment ==
=== Comics ===
- Thor in comics, various characters
- Thor (Marvel Comics), a Marvel Comics character with this name
  - Thor (Ultimate Marvel), the Ultimate Marvel version of the character
  - Thor (Marvel Cinematic Universe), the 21st-century film version of the Marvel Comics character

=== Fictional characters and entities ===
- Thor (The Hitchhiker's Guide to the Galaxy)
- Thor (Stargate)
- Thor (The Asylum)
- Phecda Gamma Thor, from the anime Saint Seiya

=== Film and television ===
- Thor (film), a 2011 American live-action superhero film based on the Marvel Comics character
- Thor: The Dark World, a 2013 American film sequel
- Thor: Ragnarok, a 2017 American film sequel
- Thor: Love and Thunder, a 2022 American film sequel
- Thor: Tales of Asgard, a 2011 American direct-to-video animated film based on the Marvel Comics character
- Legends of Valhalla: Thor, 2011 CGI animated feature film
- "Thor" (Marvel Studios: Legends), an episode of Marvel Studios: Legends

=== Music ===
- Thor (band), a Canadian heavy metal band
- Thor (soundtrack), to the 2011 Marvel Studios film
- Thor (Wizard album), 2009

=== Other media ===
- Thor (sculpture), an outdoor work by Melvin Schuler in Portland, Oregon, US
- Thor (video game), a 1988 video game by Proein Soft Line
- The History of Rome (podcast), often abbreviated THoR

== Companies ==
- Thor (motorcycles), American company founded 1901
- Thor Equities, a private equity corporation in New York City
- Thor Industries, world's largest manufacturer of recreational vehicles
- Thor Power Tool Company, a former U.S. manufacturer
  - Thor Power Tool Company v. Commissioner, a 1979 U.S. Supreme Court Case

== Natural sciences ==
- Thor (crustacean), a genus of shrimps
- Thor (volcano), an active volcano on Jupiter's moon Io
- Thorium, a chemical element
- Thor (1903), a Danish Research vessel 1903–1927

== People ==
- Thor (given name), including a list of individuals with the name Thor

=== Surname ===
- Brad Thor, author
- Cameron Thor, film and TV actor
- Ebba Busch Thor, Swedish politician
- Jon Mikl Thor (born 1955), Canadian heavy metal singer and bodybuilder
- JT Thor, basketball player

=== Nickname ===
- Bobby Nystrom, nicknamed "Thor", NHL ice hockey player
- Noah Syndergaard, nicknamed "Thor", MLB baseball player
- Hafþór Júlíus Björnsson, nicknamed "Thor", Icelandic strongman

=== Stage name ===
- Thor (singer) (born 1982), Filipino singer, performer and songwriter
- Kevin Wacholz, professional wrestler
- Thor, a member of the TV show American Gladiators
- Thor/Thor "The Body" Olsen, a professional wrestler from NWA All-Star Wrestling
- The Mighty Thor, a professional wrestler in World Championship Wrestling who competed in SuperBrawl I
- "Finland Hellraiser" Thor, a stage name of professional wrestler Tony Halme

== Places ==
- Thor (volcano), an active volcano on Jupiter's moon Io
- Thor, Iowa, a small town in the US
- Le Thor, a town in southern France
- Mount Thor, Baffin Island, Nunavut, Canada
- Mount Thor, Monashee Mountains, British Columbia
- Mount Thor (Alaska), Chugach Mountains, Alaska, US
- Thor's Cave, in Staffordshire, England
- Thorland Peninsula, Greenland
- Thor Fjord, Greenland
- Thor Peak (Washington), in the US

== Technology ==
=== Computing ===
- Tactical Hybrid Order Router (THOR), an electronic trading platform
- Thor (video codec), a candidate for the development of an open and royalty free next-generation video coding standard
- CST Thor, a series of personal computers designed by Cambridge Systems Technology
- Thor-CD, a recordable CD format proposed in 1988 by Tandy but never released in commercial version

=== Vessels ===
- German auxiliary cruiser Thor, a German surface raider in World War II
- HMS Thor, a cancelled British T-class submarine
- HNoMS Thor, three Royal Norwegian Navy warships
- ICGV Þór, the flagship of the Icelandic Coast Guard
- Thor (1903), Danish research vessel (1903–1920)
- Thor (1930), Danish hydrographical research vessel (1933–1936)
- USS Thor, American Navy support vessel (1945–1973)
- HSwMS Thor, Swedish coastal defence ship (1898–1937)

=== Weapons and military technology ===
==== Weapons ====
- PGM-17 Thor, an American intermediate range ballistic missile
- Bristol Thor, a ramjet engine used on the Bristol Bloodhound missile
- Project Thor, a theoretical US orbital kinetic bombardment weapons system
- Thor, an alternate name for the Karl-Gerät, a 600mm German mortar used in World War II
- THOR/Multi Mission System (MMS), a British Army vehicle-mounted Starstreak missile launcher
- "Thor", alternate name for the US Mark 7 nuclear bomb, the first US tactical nuclear bomb
- THOR (directed energy weapon)

==== Other military technology ====
- Theatre History of Operations Reports, a U.S. Air Force database endeavoring to catalog every bomb dropped by the US military since World War I
- Thor III, a man-portable device for remote-controlled IED jamming

=== Other technologies ===
- Thor (rocket family), a space launch vehicle derived from the PGM-17
- Thor (satellite) (previously known as Marcopolo), a satellite constellation owned by Telenor
- THOR, a type of crash test dummy
- Thor 1-A, a version of the Thor T/A ultralight aircraft
- Thor washing machine, the first electric clothes washer sold commercially in the US
- Daihatsu Thor, a mini multi-purpose vehicle sold in Japan
- Airbus THOR

== Other uses ==
- Thor (walrus), a walrus sighted in the Netherlands and the UK in 2022–23
- Thor language, a Tibeto-Burman language of Chin State, Myanmar

== See also ==
- Thar (disambiguation)
- Thaw (disambiguation)
- Thur (disambiguation)
- Tor (disambiguation)
