= Tor =

Tor, TOR or ToR may refer to:

== Places ==
- Toronto, Canada
  - Toronto Raptors
- Tor, Pallars, a village in Spain
- Tor, former name of Sloviansk, Ukraine, a city
- Mount Tor, Tasmania, Australia, an extinct volcano
- Tor Bay, Devon, England
- Tor River, Western New Guinea, Indonesia
- El Tor, Egypt, a small city on the Sinai coast

== Science and technology ==
- Tor (fish), a genus of fish commonly known as mahseers
- Target of rapamycin, a regulatory enzyme
- Tor functor, in mathematics
- Tor (network), an Internet communication method for enabling online anonymity
  - The Tor Project, a software organization that maintains the Tor network and the related Tor Browser
- Telex-on-radio, a wireless Teleprinter transmission medium
- Top-of-rack switch (ToR), a device used in data center networks

== People ==
- Tor (given name), a Nordic masculine given name
- Tor (surname)
- Tor Johnson, stage name of Swedish professional wrestler and actor Karl Erik Tore Johansson (1902 or 1903–1971)
- Tor (musician), Canadian electronic musician Tor Sjogren

== Arts, entertainment, and media ==
=== Fictional characters ===
- Tor (comics), a prehistoric human character
- Tor, a space pilot in the Millarworld comic book series Empress
- Tor, a character in Robin McKinley's book The Hero and the Crown
- Tor, a character in the animated television series Moby Dick and Mighty Mightor
- Sir Tor, one of the Knights of the Round Table

=== In print ===
- Tor, 1944 Dutch novel by Gerard Walschap
- Tor.com, former name of Reactor science fiction and fantasy magazine

=== Other arts, entertainment, and media ===
- The One Ring Roleplaying Game ("TOR"), a tabletop role-playing game set in J.R.R. Tolkien's Middle-earth
- TheOneRing.net, a fandom website for Middle-earth-related topics

== Companies ==
- Tor Air, a former Swedish charter airline
- Tor Books, a publishing company
- Tor Line, a former Swedish shipping company

== Military ==
- HNoMS Tor, several Norwegian Navy craft
- Panavia Tornado, combat aircraft (ICAO aircraft type designator TOR)
- Tor (rifle), a Polish sniper rifle
- Tor missile system, a Russian anti-aircraft weapon

== Other uses ==
- Tor (rock formation), a rock outcrop or hill
- Tor, Toowoomba, a heritage listed villa at Queensland, Australia
- Tor (research station), a Norwegian research station in Antarctica
- Tor, a subdivision of the Orya–Tor languages of Western New Guinea, Indonesia
- Toorak railway station, Melbourne
- TOR, IATA airport code and FAA location identifier of Torrington Municipal Airport, Wyoming, US
- Transport of Rockland, a bus system in Rockland County, New York, US
- Terms of reference, define the purpose and structure of a collection of people with a common goal
- T.O.R., nominal letters added after their name by a member of the Third Order Regular of Saint Francis of Penance, a mendicant religious order
- Tornado warning, a weather alert whose SAME code is TOR
- Transcript of Records, an inventory of the courses taken and grades earned of a student
- Tor oil field, an oil field in the Norwegian sector of the North Sea

== See also ==
- Tor Castle, Highland, Scotland
- Tor Formation, a geological formation of the North Sea
- Tor Limestone, a geologic formation in Nevada
- El Tor, a strain of bacteria
- El Tor, Egypt, a city
  - El Tor Airport
- Glastonbury Tor
- Tor-tor dance, a traditional Indonesian dance
- Thor (disambiguation)
- Torr (disambiguation)
- Torre (disambiguation)
- Tors (disambiguation)
