= Tur =

Tur or TUR may refer to:

== Religious works ==
- Arba'ah Turim, a work of Jewish law, also known as the Tur
- At-Tur, the 52nd sura of the Qur'an

== People ==
- Ali Tur (1889–1977), French architect
- Jacob ben Asher (c. 1270 – 1340), German rabbinic authority, author of Arba'ah Turim, also known as "the Tur"
- Jan Tur (1875–1942), Polish zoologist
- Jordi Tur (born 1998), Spanish footballer
- Katy Tur (born 1983), American author and journalist
- Marc Tur (born 1994), Spanish race walker
- Mohan Singh Tur (1915–1979), Indian politician
- Naphtali Wolf Tur (died 1885), Russian Hebrew poet
- Nuncia María Tur (born 1940), Argentinian botanist with the standard botanical author abbreviation "Tur"
- Tur (Shahnameh), son of Fereydun and predecessor of the Turanians
- Yunior Tur (born 1999), Cuban baseball player
- Zoey Tur (born 1960), American broadcast reporter

== Places ==
=== Settlements ===
- El-Tor, Egypt, also known as Tur
- Tur, Markazi, a village in Markazi province, Iran
- Tur, South Khorasan, a village in South Khorasan province, Iran
- Tur Rural District, an administrative division of Simorgh County, Mazandaran province, Iran
- At-Tur (Mount of Olives), a Jerusalem neighborhood
- Tuř, a municipality and village in the Czech Republic
- Tur, Kuyavian-Pomeranian Voivodeship, a village in north-central Poland
- Tur, Łódź Voivodeship, a village in central Poland
- Tur, a village in Negrești-Oaș town, Romania
- Tűr, the Hungarian name for Tiur village, Blaj, Romania

=== Natural features ===
- Tur (river), river in Romania and Hungary

=== Transportation ===
- TUR, the National Rail station code for Turkey Street railway station, London, England

== Living things ==
- East Caucasian tur, a species of goat
- West Caucasian tur, a species of goat
- Tur (mite), a genus of mites

== Other ==
- Tur (bean), a name for the pigeon pea in India
- Tur (cuneiform), a cuneiform sign
- Turkish language (ISO 639-2 language code)
- Transurethral resection, a surgical procedure
- AMZ Tur, Polish military vehicle
- Toxics use reduction, in pollution prevention
- Test Unit Ready, a SCSI command in computer science
- Tur (Bosnian-Slavic mythology), a mythical creature
- Test Uncertainty Ratio, a concept in calibration

== See also ==
- Thur (disambiguation)
