= Tur, Iran =

Tur or Toor (Persian: طور) in Iran, may refer to:

- Tur, Markazi
- Tur, South Khorasan
