= Thur =

Thur or Thür may refer to:

- Thür, a municipality in Rhineland-Palatine, Germany
- Thur (France), a river in Alsace, France
- Thur (Rhine), a river in East Switzerland
- Georg Thür (1846–1924), German architect
- Walter Engelbert Thür (1934–2004), founder of Walter Thür Organbuilders, a Swedish pipe organ maker
- Thur., taxonomic author abbreviation for French botanist Gustave Thuret (1817–1875)
- Thur., an abbreviation of Thursday
- Thür., an abbreviation of Thuringia, a German state
- Thur, once considered a dialect of the Acholi dialect of Uganda

== See also ==
- Thur waterfalls, on the Swiss river
- Thar (disambiguation)
- Thor (disambiguation)
- Tur (disambiguation)
