= Majesty (band) =

German heavy metal band

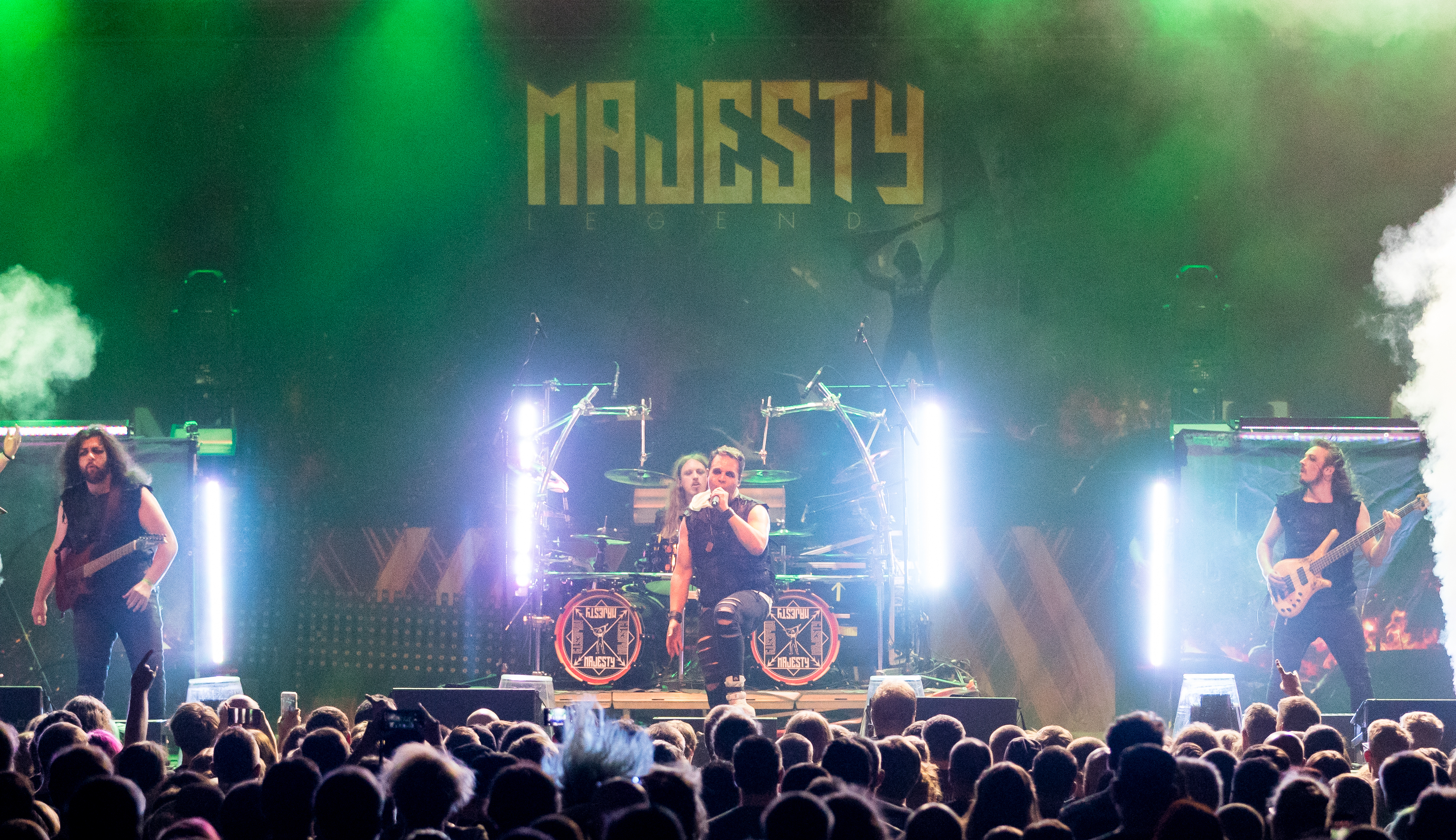
- Majesty performing in 2019

Background information
- Origin: Germany
- Genres: Heavy metal, power metal
- Years active: 2000–2023
- Labels: Napalm; Reaper Entertainment
- Website: majesty-metal.de

Majesty (known as Metalforce between 2008 and 2011) was a German heavy metal band. They were heavily influenced by Manowar.

== History ==
Majesty described their music as "true metal"—a term commonly used in the heavy metal scene to refer to traditional heavy metal or power metal characterized by idealized, traditional, and fantasy-based lyrics and stage appearances. The band members typically donned leather attire.

Bandleader Tarek Maghary also organizes a festival called Keep It True (named after a song from Metalforce) that features traditional heavy metal bands, often showcasing reunions or rare appearances of American metal acts. Tarek Maghary is also the creator of the Dawnrider project, a metal concept album featuring numerous musicians, including Rob Rock, Ross the Boss, and Michael Seifert from Rebellion. Other contributors hail from Manilla Road, Wizard, Helstar, and Paragon.

During the Magic Circle Festival in 2008, the band announced their name change from Majesty to Metalforce. However, in 2011, they changed it back.

On 6 April 2023, the band announced their split, revealing their decision to conclude their journey following the release of their final album, Back to Attack. In their statement, they conveyed that while the decision was challenging, they had been contemplating it for some time. They emphasized their desire for authenticity, stating that continuing to create music would lead only to repetition, lacking the originality of their earlier works. The band felt that after ten official albums, their story had been fully told and they did not wish to extend it unnecessarily.

They also expressed their commitment to avoiding complacency, opting not to fade away with uninspired releases or tours that offered no surprises. The members believed that Back to Attack encapsulated the band's magic and energy, making it a fitting conclusion to their career. They aimed to celebrate this final chapter with a significant release show, showcasing their best work. Ultimately, they stressed the importance of following their hearts, stating that while the decision was difficult, it felt right to end their journey on a high note.

== Members ==
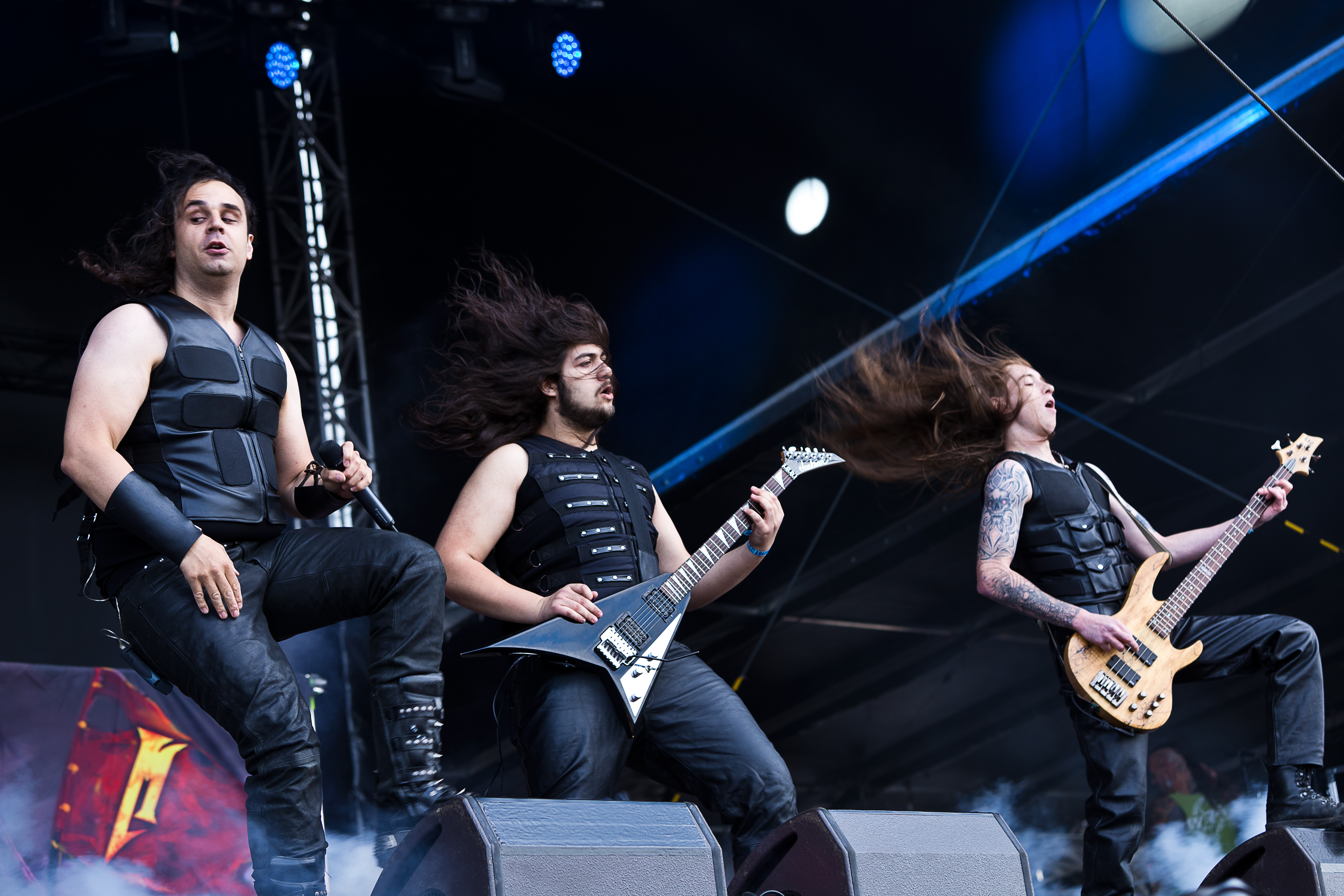
Majesty at Rockharz Open Air 2015

=== Past members ===
- Tarek Maghary – vocals, keyboards (guitars 1997–2003)
- Robin Hadamovsky – guitars
- Alex Voß – bass
- Alexander Palma – bass
- Jan Raddatz – drums
- Emanuel Knorr – guitar
- Tristan Visser – guitar
- Marcus Bielenberg – bass
- Björn Daigger – rhythm guitar
- Christian Münzer – lead guitar
- Chris Heun – live bass (on fall 2004 tour)
- Udo Keppner – guitars
- Martin Hehn – bass
- Markus Pruszydlo – keyboards
- Andreas Moll – keyboards
- Ingo Zadravo – drums
- Rolf Munkes – lead guitar

== Discography ==
- Keep it True (2000)
- Sword & Sorcery (2002)
- Reign in Glory (2003)
- Metal Law (live album, 2004)
- Sons of a New Millennium (EP, 2006)
- Hellforces (2006)
- Metalforce (2009) (as Metalforce)
- Own the Crown (compilation, 2011)
- Thunder Rider (2013)
- Banners High (2013)
- Generation Steel (2015)
- Rebels (2017)
- Legends (2019)
- Back to Attack (2023)
