= Thunder Rider =

Studio album by Majesty
- Released: January 4, 2013
- Genre: Power metal, heavy metal
- Length: 52:55
- Label: Noiseart Records (Universal)
- Producer: Tarek "MS" Maghary

Majesty chronology
Own the Crown (2011)	Thunder Rider (2013)

Professional ratings
Review scores
Source	Rating
Sputnikmusic	2/5 stars
Metal Temple	6/10 stars
Metal Hammer	3/7 stars
Metal.de	5/10 stars
Rock Hard	8/10 stars
Powermetal.de	7/10 stars

Thunder Rider is the comeback sixth album by German heavy metal band Majesty. It was released on January 4, 2013, through Noiseart Records in both standard and deluxe editions. The deluxe edition included an additional DVD which contained a documentary titled Metal Union. The DVD features interviews with bands and journalists and tries to unveil the secret of heavy metal music. The song, "Metal Union", which concludes the album is a musical conversion of this topic. It features guest appearances by Sven D'Anna (Wizard), Hannes Braun (Kissin' Dynamite), Mat Sinner (Primal Fear / Sinner), Patrick Fuchs (Ross The Boss), Andreas Babushkin (Paragon) and Marta Gabriel (Crystal Viper).

== Track listing ==
All tracks are written by Tarek "MS" Maghary.

No.	Title	Length
1.	"Thunder Rider"	4:46
2.	"Warlords of the Sea"	6:12
3.	"Anthem Of Glory"	4:48
4.	"Make Some Noise"	3:48
5.	"Metalliator"	4:52
6.	"Raise The Beast"	6:08
7.	"New Era"	4:55
8.	"Asteria"	6:36
9.	"Young And Free"	5:24
10.	"Rebellion Of Steel"	4:36
11.	"Metal Union"	6:10

== Personnel ==
- Tarek "MS" Maghary – lead vocals
- Tristan Visser – guitar
- Alex Palma – bass
- Jan Raddatz – drums
