= Torr (surname) =

Torr is an English surname. Notable people named Torr include

- A. C. Torr, punning pseudonym of actor Frederick Hobson Leslie (1866–1892)
- Cecil Torr (1857–1928), English antiquarian and author
- Jane Torr, Australian academic
- Michèle Torr (born Michelle Cléberte Tort in 1947), French singer and author
- William George Torr (1853–1939), teacher and religious educator in South Australia

== See also ==
- Torr (disambiguation)
