= Midlist =

Books which are not bestsellers but strong enough for sales

Midlist is a term in the publishing industry which refers to books which are not bestsellers but are strong enough to economically justify their publication (and likely, further purchases of future books from the same author). The vast majority of total titles published are midlist titles, though they represent a much smaller fraction of total book sales, which are dominated by bestsellers and other very popular titles.

Authors who consistently publish profitable but not bestselling books are referred to as Midlist authors.

== United States ==
In the US, midlist and backlist publications were negatively affected by the US Supreme Court decision in the 1979 case Thor Power Tool Company v. Commissioner of Internal Revenue. This decision reinterpreted rules for inventory depreciation, changing how book publishers had to account for unsold inventory each year, and their ability to depreciate it. Because stocks of unsold books could no longer be written down without proof of value, it became more efficient tax-wise for companies to simply destroy inventory.

The Thor decision caused publishers and booksellers to be much quicker to destroy stocks of poorly-selling books in order to realize a taxable loss. These books would previously have been kept in stock but written down to reflect the fact that not all of them were expected to sell. This has been somewhat mitigated by the development of online bookselling, which makes less popular titles more accessible to average readers. (For more on this phenomenon, see The Long Tail.)

Because this book is out of print, the publisher has an opening on its list, more cash to invest, and a serious need to replace the steady (if small) income stream that book would have generated. So the publisher must release not only the new title it would have published anyway, but a second new one, to make up for its lack of a backlist... This results in title proliferation, which itself promotes both lower advance orders on the part of major buyers, and a higher return rate. That means writers must write more, and sell more often, in order to survive.
