= Burgemeister =

Burgemeister is a surname. Notable people with the surname include:

- Alfred Burgemeister (1906–1970), German politician
- Katja Burgemeister (born 1948), German tennis player
- Ludwig Burgemeister (1863–1932), German architect and preservationist
