= Torr (disambiguation) =

Torr may refer to:

- Torr, a unit of pressure named for physicist Evangelista Torricelli
- Torr (surname), an English surname (including a list of persons with the name)
- Torr Works, a limestone quarry in Somerset, England
- Torr., the standard botanical author abbreviation for John Torrey
- Torr Head, a headland in Northern Ireland in the barony of Cary
- Torr, also written Tor or Thorr, a townland in Gweedore, County Donegal, Ireland
- Törr, Czech metal band founded in 1977

== See also ==
- Tor (disambiguation)
- Thor (disambiguation)
- The Torrs, hills in Devon, England
- Torrs Hydro, a micro hydroelectric scheme in Derbyshire, England
- Torr Marro, American lacrosse player
