= Günther Grundmann =

German art historian and monument preservator

Günther Grundmann (10 April 1892 – 19 June 1976) was a German art historian, museum curator and monument preservator.

== Life ==
Born in Jelenia Góra, Krkonoše Mountains, Province of Silesia, after Abitur in his hometown in 1912, Grundmann studied art history at the Ludwig-Maximilians-Universität München (LMU) in Munich among others with Heinrich Wölfflin and Paul Frankl. In addition to his studies, he learned painting at the Walter Thor painting school and attended the Königliche Kunstgewerbeschule München from 1913 onwards, where he took, among other things, the typeface class with Fritz Helmuth Ehmcke and the furniture design class with Richard Riemerschmid. When war broke out in 1914, he first returned to Hirschberg and then continued his art history studies at the University of Breslau, which he completed in 1916 with a doctorate (Dr. phil.) under the conduct of Bernhard Patzak.

From 1919 to 1932, Grundmann was a teacher of art history at the Holzschnitzschule Bad Warmbrunn and an honorary administrator of the "Hausfleißverein", an association for Silesian needlework. From 1932 onwards, he was the successor of Ludwig Burgemeister Landeskonservator for Province of Lower Silesia in Wroclaw. At the same time he was a member of the Historical Commission for Silesia]. In 1938, he was appointed professor at the Technische Hochschule Breslau.

In 1935, he reviewed a bust of the Führer by the sculptor Theodor von Gosen, a friend of his. After the German occupation of Poland in 1939, Grundmann worked in the annexed territories and published a paper on German art in "liberated Silesia". In 1940, he became a member of the NSDAP. Towards the end of the Second World War, his tasks also included the confiscation and storage of art objects at risk from bombing from Berlin and Brandenburg.

After fleeing in 1945, he first became director of the art collections of the Veste Coburg from 1947 to 1950.

In 1950, he came to Hamburg, where he was curator of monuments for the Free and Hanseatic City of Hamburg from 1950 to 1959 and, as successor to Hubert Stierling director of the Altonaer Museum. From 1951 to 1959, he was also chairman of the Vereinigung der Landesdenkmalpfleger in der Bundesrepublik Deutschland. From 1962 to 1972, he was chairman of the board of the "Kulturwerk Schlesien".

In Hamburg, Grundmann's work as a monument conservator after 1945 required completely different monument conservation concepts compared to his work before 1945: Silesia as a landscape with a rich sacral and secular building heritage going back to the Middle Ages. On the other hand, Hamburg as a Hanseatic city whose buildings, mainly from the 19th and early 20th centuries, had suffered severe destruction during the war. Whereas in Silesia it was mainly conservation that had been necessary, in Hamburg reconstruction, reconstruction and additions proved to be unavoidable.

== Medal portrait ==
- 1932: one-sided bronze casting, 80 mm, Cirillo Dell’Antonio fecit. Vorderseite: „Dr. GÜNTHER GRUNDMANN 1932“ Büste mit Kleideransatz halblinks, signiert: CdA (ligiert).

== Publications (selection) ==
- Die Büste des Führers in der Breslauer Universität, in Der Oberschlesier 1935, No. 7, pp. 371f.
- Karl XII. von Schweden und die Gnadenkirchen in Hirschberg und Landeshut. In Schlesien. Eine Vierteljahresschrift für Kunst, Wissenschaft und Volkstum. Vol. 9, 1964, pp. 14–25.
- Die Darmstadt Madonna. Eduard Roether, Darmstadt 1959. 2nd extended edition: Die Darmstädter Madonna. Der Schicksalsweg des berühmten Gemäldes von Hans Holbein d.J. Eduard Roether, Darmstadt 1972
- Die Warmbrunner Holzschnitzschule im Riesengebirge. Delp Verlag, Munich 1968.
- Kunstwanderungen in Schlesien. Gesammelte Aufsätze aus den schlesischen Jahren 1917-1945. Bergstadtverlag Wilhelm Gottl. Korn, Munich 1966.
- Kunstwanderungen im Riesengebirge. Bergstadtverlag Wilhelm Gottl. Korn, Munich 1969 [grundlegendes Werk, in Einzelfragen durch neuere Forschungen überholt].
- Barocke Kirchen und Klöster in Schlesien. Bergstadtverlag Wilhelm Gottl. Korn, Munich 2nd edition 1971.
- Erlebter Jahre Widerschein. Bergstadtverlag Wilhelm Gottl. Korn, Munich 1972 [tlw. Autobiografie, sonst Bericht von Schlösserbesuchen während der Zeit als niederschles. Provinzialkonservator].
- Stätten der Erinnerung. Denkmäler erzählen schlesische Geschichte. Bergstadtverlag Wilhelm Gottl. Korn, Munich 2nd edition 1975.
- Burgen, Schlösser und Gutshäuser in Schlesien. Frankfurt. (Bau- und Kunstdenkmäler im östlichen Europa)
  - Vol. 1. Die mittelalterlichen Burgruinen, Burgen und Wohntürme. 1982
  - Vol. 2. Schlösser und Feste Häuser der Renaissance. 1987 [factual, discontinued edition].
- with Wulf Schadendorf: Schlesien, Deutscher Kunstverlag, Munich 1962
- Hirschberg. In Hugo Weczerka (ed.): Schlesien. 2nd edition. Stuttgart 2003, pp. 189–193.

== Family ==
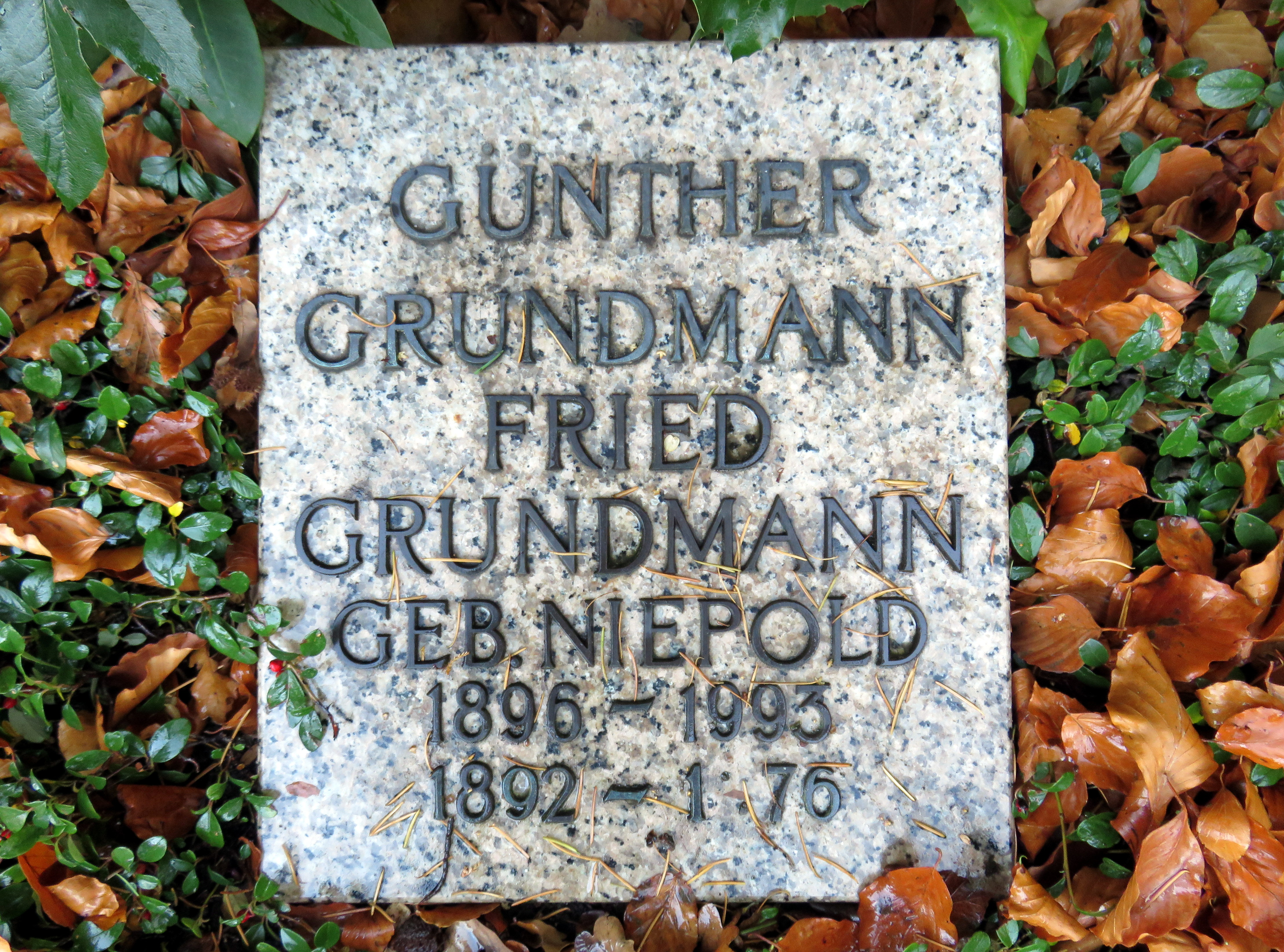
Grab Günther Grundmann, Friedhof Ohlsdorf

Grundmann had been married to Elfriede Niepold since 1916. They had a daughter and the later architect Friedhelm Grundmann.

Grundmann died in Hamburg at the age of 82 and was buried in the Ohlsdorf Cemetery in Hamburg.

== Awards ==
- 1969: Schlesierschild of the Landsmannschaft Schlesien
