= Tor (given name) =

Tor (Þor) is a Nordic masculine given name derived from the name of the Norse god Thor. It may refer to

- Tor Ahlsand (born 1931), Norwegian Olympic rower
- Tor Albert Ersdal (born 1972), Norwegian Olympic rower
- Tor Arneberg (1928–2015), Norwegian Olympic sailor
- Tor Arne Andreassen (born 1983), Norwegian association football player
- Tor Egil Horn (born 1976), Norwegian football goalkeeper
- Tor Egil Kreken (born 1977), Norwegian musician
- Tor Endresen (born 1959), Norwegian singer
- Tor Røste Fossen (1940–2017), Norwegian football coach
- Tor Graves (born 1972), Thai racing driver
- Tor Gundersen (1935–2012), Norwegian Olympic ice hockey player
- Tor Håkon Holte (born 1958), Norwegian Olympic cross-country skier
- Tor Halvorsen (1930–1987), Norwegian politician
- Tor Heiestad (born 1962), Norwegian Olympic shooter
- Tor Helge Eikeland (born 1960), Norwegian Olympic ice hockey player
- Tor Helness (born 1957 or 1958), Norwegian professional bridge player
- Tor Henning Hamre (born 1979), Norwegian football striker
- Tor Hogne Aarøy (born 1977), Norwegian football forward
- Tor Isedal (1924–1990), Swedish actor
- Tor Erik Jenstad (born 1956), Norwegian linguist
- Tor Johnson (1903–1971), Swedish professional wrestler
- Tor Arne Bell Ljunggren (born 1962), Norwegian politician
- Tor Lund (1888–1972), Norwegian Olympic gymnast
- Tor Lundsten (1926–1970), Finnish Olympic rower
- Tor Mann (1894–1974), Swedish conductor
- Tor Miller (born 1994), American musician
- Tor Njaa (1912–1944), Norwegian resistance member during World War II
- Tor Nessling (1901–1971), Finnish industrialist
- Tor Nilsson (1919–1989), Swedish Olympic wrestler
- Tor Norberg (1888–1972), Swedish Olympic gymnast
- Tor Nørretranders (born 1955), Danish author
- Tor Oftedal (1925–1980), Norwegian politician
- Tor Ole Skullerud (born 1970), Norwegian football manager and former player
- Tor Ørvig (1916–1994), Norwegian-born Swedish paleontologist
- Tor Richter (1938–2010), Norwegian Olympic shooter
- Tor Seidler (born 1952), American author
- Tor Sigbjørn Utsogn (born 1974), Norwegian politician
- Tor Skeie (born 1965), Norwegian Olympic cross-country skier
- Tor Sørnes (1925–2017), Norwegian inventor
- Tor Stokke (1928–2003), Norwegian actor
- Tor-Arne Strøm (born 1952), Norwegian politician
- Tor Svendsberget (born 1947), Norwegian Olympic biathlon competitor
- Tor Torgersen (1928–2020), Norwegian Olympic runner
- Tor Ulven (1953–1995), Norwegian poet
- Tor Wahlman (1878–1954), Swedish military commander

== See also ==
- Tor (disambiguation)
- Tor (surname)
- Tó, nicknames
- Ton (given name)
