= Backlist =

Older books available from a publisher

A backlist is a list of older books available from a publisher. This is opposed to newly-published titles, which is sometimes known as the frontlist.

== Business ==
Building a strong backlist has traditionally been considered the best method to produce a profitable publishing house, as the most expensive aspects of the publishing process have already been paid for and the only remaining expenses are reproduction costs and author royalty.

"The backlist is the financial backbone of the book industry, accounting for 25 to 30 percent of the average publisher's sales," printed The New York Times. "Current titles, known as the front list, are often a gamble: they can become best sellers, but they are much more likely to disappear in a flood of returns from bookstores. By contrast, backlist books usually have predictable sales and revenues."

== United States ==
In the US, backlist and midlist publications were negatively affected by the US Supreme Court decision in the 1979 case Thor Power Tool Company v. Commissioner of Internal Revenue. This decision reinterpreted rules for inventory depreciation, changing how book publishers had to account for unsold inventory each year, and their ability to depreciate it. Because stocks of unsold books could no longer be written down without proof of value, it became more efficient tax-wise for companies to simply destroy inventory.

The Thor decision caused publishers and booksellers to be much quicker to destroy stocks of poorly-selling books in order to realize a taxable loss. These books would previously have been kept in stock but written down to reflect the fact that not all of them were expected to sell. This has been somewhat mitigated by the development of online bookselling, which makes less popular titles more accessible to average readers. (For more on this phenomenon, see Long tail.)

Because this book is out of print, the publisher has an opening on its list, more cash to invest, and a serious need to replace the steady (if small) income stream that the book would have generated. So the publisher must release not only the new title it would have published anyway, but a second new one, to make up for its lack of a backlist... This results in title proliferation, which itself promotes both lower advance orders on the part of major buyers, and a higher return rate. That means writers must write more, and sell more often, in order to survive.

== Other industries ==
Recording companies also have backlists of music titles they have published.
