= Kobus! =

Afrikaans heavy metal band

- Origin: Cape Town, South Africa
- Genres: Heavy metal black metal, extreme metal
- Years active: 2000–present
- Members: Theo Crous; Francois Breytenbach Blom; Werner von Waltsleben; Pierre Tredoux
- Past members: Rob Nel (2004–2007); Paul André Blom (2004–2007)

Kobus! (or K.O.B.U.S!) is an Afrikaans extreme metal band formed in 2000 by ex-Springbok Nude Girls guitarist Theo Crous and ex-Voice of Destruction vocalist Francois Breytenbach Blom. They performed as a duo until 2004 when they were joined by Rob Nel on bass and Paul André Blom on drums.

In 2007 Rob Nel was replaced on bass by Pierre Tredoux and in 2008 drummer Paul Andre Blom was replaced by Werner Von Waltsleben.

The band has released three albums: The self-titled debut Kobus! in 2002, 100% Skuldgevoelvry in 2004, and Swaar Metaal in 2007. The first two releases contained an eclectic mix of styles, crossing genres from track to track. The album Swaar Metaal, which won the 'Best Afrikaans Rock Album' award at the 2008 South African Music Awards, is sonically more uniform than its predecessors, an Afrikaans-language heavy metal album, regarded as a first in Afrikaans music.

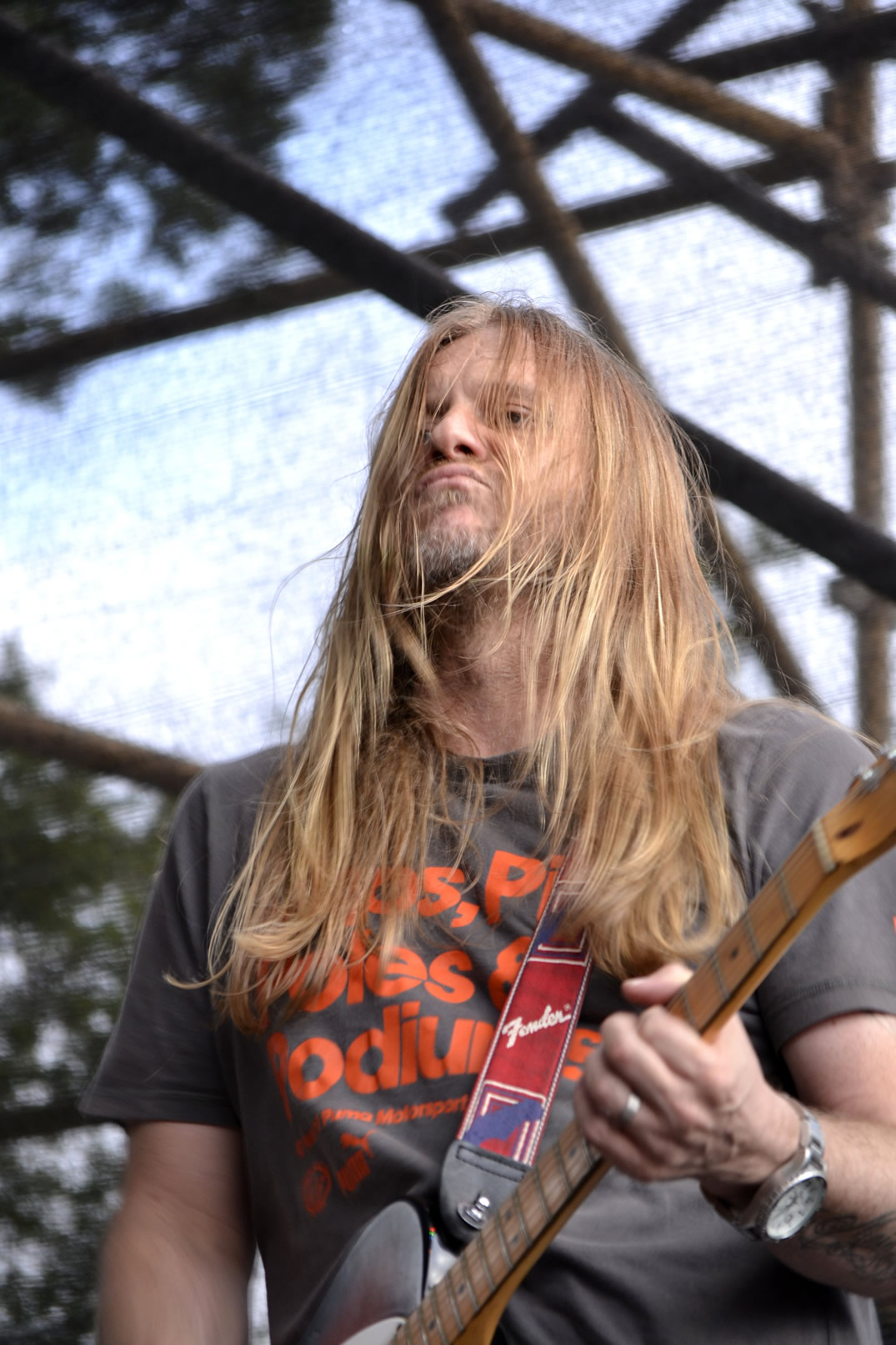
Theo Crous 2010

== Background ==
Initially formed as an experimental Afrikaans-language project in 2000 by vocalist Francois Breytenbach Blom and guitarist Theo Crous, South African band K.O.B.U.S! first release, Kobus! in 2002, through ENT Entertainment displayed a flagrant disregard for uniformity. Straying from the respective styles of their previous bands, the album mix an array of moods, blending surreal comedy with dark ballads and Afrikaans rock psychedelia on 12 tracks of electronica and electric guitar. The song "Hoenderman" was a fan favorite.

Their sophomore release, 100% Skuldgevoelvry in 2004 again disregards uniformity, a bold companion piece to their debut. Almost twice the running time of the debut album and comprising 16 tracks, the album includes a number of heavier songs as with their next album.

In 2006 K.O.B.U.S! joined the independent South African label Rhythm Records. Swaar Metaal (heavy metal), Kobus!'s third full-length album, stands apart from previous releases as a heavy metal album. The lyrics, dark in theme, deal with topical South African issues. Tracks like "Witman", which describe frustrations from some white South African's perspective, "Kinderhel", a song about child abuse, and "Doodstraf", which calls for the implementation of the death penalty, deliver very unapologetic political commentaries and deal with decaying moral standards in society. Other lyrical themes include the Apocalypse.

K.O.B.U.S! was invited to perform at the gargantuan Magic Circle Festival in Germany during July 2008. Headlined by Manowar, it featured the likes of Alice Cooper, Stormwarrior and W.A.S.P. The festival ran over four days in Bad Arolsen, Germany.

Swaar Metaal won in the category for Best Afrikaans Rock Album at the 14th annual South African Music Awards in 2008.

In March 2008 Werner Von Waltsleben replaced Paul Andre Blom on drums.

"Hoenderman"
"Hoenderman", a fan favourite, demonstrates the band's earlier electronic endeavors.

"Swaar Metaal"
By their third album, Kobus!' sound had taken a more metal approach.

In 2024 they released a single called "Drankduiwel" (alcohol devil) after 16 years of unofficial hiatus.

== Discography ==
- Kobus! (2002)
- 100% Skuldgevoelvry (2004)
- Swaar Metaal (2007)
