= Magic Circle Festival =

Music festival near Bad Arolsen, Germany

Coordinates: 51°21′23.72″N 9°00′21.71″E

- Genre: Heavy metal
- Dates: 2007-07-06 to 2007-07-07 2008-07-09 to 2008-07-12; 2009-07-17 to 2009-07-18; 2010-07-09 to 2010-07-11 2014-07-25
- Locations: Bad Arolsen, Germany; Lorelei, Germany; Tolmin, Slovenia
- Years active: 2007 – present
- Founders: Joey DeMaio
- Website: http://www.magiccirclefestival.com/

Magic Circle Festival is an annual heavy metal festival organized by Magic Circle Music and founded by Joey DeMaio of the band Manowar. The festival was first held on 6 and 7 July 2007 in Bad Arolsen, Germany. The success of the 2007 festival, headlined by Manowar and attended by 25,000 people, led to an expanded festival in 2008, held over four days from 9 to 12 July. The lineup for the 2008 festival comprised a number of international acts, including Alice Cooper, Whitesnake, W.A.S.P. and Def Leppard. However, organisational and contractual difficulties led to the cancellation of Whitesnake and Def Leppard. In 2009, the festival was scaled back to two days and held in Lorelei on 18 and 19 July. The fourth Magic Circle Festival took place in Metalcamp in Slovenia at 11 July 2010, and on 25 July 2014 the fifth and currently latest Magic Circle Festival was held in Helsinki.

== Lineups ==
=== 2007 ===
- Black Situation
- David Shankle Group
- Gamma Ray
- Heavenly
- HolyHell
- Imperia
- Lion's Share
- Manowar
- Messiah's Kiss
- Mob Rules
- Mordeen
- Saidian
- Sixth Sense
- Stormwarrior

=== 2008 ===
- Alice Cooper
- Beloved Enemy
- Benedictum
- Brazen Abbot (with Joe Lynn Turner)
- Cassock (winner of the Battle of the bands contest)
- Def Leppard (canceled due to "contractual difficulties")
- Doro
- Gotthard
- HolyHell
- Jack Starr's Burning Starr
- KOBUS!
- Krypteria
- Majesty/Metal Force
- Manowar
- Michael Schenker Group
- Mob Rules
- Sixth Sense
- Stormwarrior
- Ted Nugent
- Titanium Black
- W.A.S.P.
- Whitesnake (canceled due to "contractual difficulties")

=== 2009 ===
- Age of Evil
- Crystal Viper
- Domain
- Heatseeker (side stage)
- HolyHell
- Jack Starr's Burning Starr
- Kingdom Come
- Manowar
- Metal Force
- Ulytau
- Van Canto
- Wizard

=== 2010 ===
- Arch Enemy
- Crosswind
- HolyHell
- Kamelot
- Manowar
- Metalforce
- Virgin Steele
- Who Was I
- Sabaton

=== 2014 ===
- Hostile
- Imperia (with Netta Dahlberg on lead vocals)
- Manowar
- Teräsbetoni

== DVD ==
A 2 disc DVD package of the 2007 event was released in October 2007. It was produced by Manowar bassist Joey DeMaio and directed by Neil Johnson.

The DVD was also included as a gift for a limited time to anyone who bought tickets for Magic Circle Festival 2008.

A DVD covering the 2008 festival was released in September 2008.
