= Tors =

Tors may refer to:

- Tors (band), an English band
- Tor, a type of rock outcrop
- Ivan Tors (1916–1983), playwright, screenwriter and film and television producer
- TransOral Robotic Surgery, a surgical technique

== See also ==
- Tor (disambiguation)
- Ten Tors
- Tors Cove, Newfoundland and Labrador
