= Head of the Deceiver =

Studio album by Wizard
- Released: 2001
- Recorded: Black Solaris Studios, Germany
- Genre: Power metal, speed metal
- Length: 47:35
- Label: Limb Music
- Producer: Uwe Lulis

Wizard chronology
Bound By Metal (1999)	Head of the Deceiver (2001)	Odin (2003)

Head of the Deceiver is an album by the German power metal band Wizard, released in 2001.

It was later re-issued in 2015.

== Track listing ==
All songs written and arranged by Wizard

1. "Evitum Okol" – 0:59
2. "Magic Potion" – 4:24
3. "Head of the Deceiver" – 4:50
4. "Collective Mind" – 4:42
5. "Defenders of Metal" – 4:32
6. "Calm of the Storm" – 5:04
7. "Demon Witches" – 4:41
8. "Iron War" – 3:22
9. "The First One" – 4:43
10. "Revenge" – 3:42
11. "True Metal" – 6:41

== Personnel ==
- Sven D'Anna – vocals
- Michael Maass – guitar
- Volker Leson – bass
- Sören van Heek – drums
