= Swaar Metaal =

Studio album by Kobus!
- Released: 2007
- Genre: Extreme metal/Heavy Metal
- Label: Rhythm Records

Kobus! chronology
100% Skuldgevoelvry (2004)	Swaar Metaal (2007)	Drankduiwel (2024)

Swaar Metaal is the third studio album by South African heavy metal band Kobus!, released on the independent record label Rhythm Records in March 2007. The ten-track album (and unlisted hidden track) sees the band's founder-members, Francois Breytenbach Blom and Theo Crous breaking away from the previous two albums experimental approach and returning to their metal roots.

== Name ==
Directly translated from Afrikaans Swaar Metaal literally means heavy metal; Afrikaners are not known to use this expression in the same context as English speaking metal music fans. As the name suggests, the music itself is heavy metal music.

== Lyrical content ==
Swaar Metaal departs from the previous two albums in it being a straight Heavy Metal album. The lyrics, dark in theme, deal with topical South African sociopolitical, cultural and racial issues. Tracks like Witman, which describe frustrations from the perspectives of some young post-Apartheid white South Africans, Kinderhel, a song about child abuse and Doodstraf, which calls for the implementation of the death penalty in light of high crime figures across South Africa, deliver very unapologetic political commentaries and deal with decaying moral standards in society. Other lyrical themes include aspects of the Apocalypse.

The album is called Swaar Metaal, not Pink Plastic! When it came to this album we thought let's make an album in a style that we really love and do well.

— (Francois Breytenbach Blom – 05 Apr 2007)

== Reception and accolades ==
Professional ratings
Review scores
Source	Rating
channel 24	3/5 stars
Chronicles of Chaos	8.5/10 stars

With reviews across the South African metal spectrum ranging from mixed to positive, Swaar Metaal has been hailed as the first full-length Afrikaans metal album. Chronicles of Chaos critic Quentin Kalis described it as "...the metal album South Africa has been crying out for; an album able to appeal to the mainstream orientated rock fan yet will also grab the attention of the serious metalhead and may prove to be the catalyst needed to galvanize the scene".

The album won in the category for Best Afrikaans Rock Album at the 14th annual South African Music Awards in 2008.

The music video of the title-track Swaar Metaal was nominated in the MK video awards (hosted by SA music video channel MK) in the category Hardest Video.

== Track listing ==
1. "Honger" (Hunger)
2. "Witman" (Whiteman)
3. "Tienerangs" (Teenage Angst)
4. "N.J.S.A" (Hymn of the New Young South Africa)
5. "Huigelaar" (Hypocrite)
6. "Doodstraf" (Death Sentence)
7. "Die Vlam" (The Flame)
8. "Kinderhel" (Children's Hell)
9. "Amen"
10. "Swaar Metaal" (Heavy Metal)
11. "Hades" (hidden track)
