= Reign in Glory =

Studio album by Majesty
- Released: 27 October 2003
- Genre: Heavy metal
- Length: 65:07
- Label: Massacre Records

Majesty chronology
Sword & Sorcery (2002)	Reign in Glory (2003)	Metal Law (2004)

Reign in Glory, released in 2003, is the third full-length album by the German heavy metal band Majesty.

The album was recorded by Stefan Kaufmann in Roxxstudios. Powermetal.de immediately called the album "a true feast for the ears", evoking emotion with lyrics in the vein of "tragic fantasy literature", battles and warriors. Musically, it was well executed with "a powerful punch", making for "over 65 minutes of pure listening pleasure".

Chronicles of Chaos rated it poorly. A 5.5 out of 10, the reviewer opined that Majesty's genre could put out some "deplorably moronic" music; in light of this, "Majesty are limited by the style of metal they play". The music, though anthemic, was "tedious" and lacked "maturity", and the production had severe limitations: "The music itself is put through a very forced and unbalanced production, dry guitars slashing away under domineering and badly triggered drums, whilst thin and reedy vocals attempt to do a convincing metal falsetto".

Heavymetal.dk countered with giving Reign in Glory a perfect 10 rating, calling it a "true metal masterpiece" and "record of the year". Rock Hard also gave a strong rating, 8 out of 10. Norway's Scream Magazine gave a 4 out of 6 rating, with Majesty delivering honest and simple true metal. Not every song was of high quality, and the album was "at least a quarter too long". Exact gave the same rating.

== Track listing ==
1. "Heavy Metal Battlecry" – 4:46
2. "Into the Stadiums" – 4:37
3. "Reign in Glory" – 5:19
4. "Will of the Cobra" – 4:54
5. "Defender of the Brave" – 7:14
6. "Lord of the Damned" – 8:02
7. "Heroes" – 6:38
8. "Thunder in the Silence" – 7:54
9. "Troopers of Steel" – 5:13
10. "Falcon in the Storm" – 10:30
