= Ludwig Burgemeister =

German architect and preservationist

Ludwig Burgemeister (19 October 1863 – 13 February 1932) was a German architect and monument preservationist.

== Life ==
Born in St. Johann (Saar), Burgemeister was a son of the master mason and architect Christian Burgemeister and his wife Lina Burgemeister née Gottlieb. He attended the royal grammar school Saarbrücken, where he passed his school-leaving examination in 1883. He then studied architecture at the Technische Hochschule in Charlotttenburg (now Technische Universität Berlin) for nine semesters and passed the First State Examination in February 1888. On 5 March 1888, he was sworn in as a Regierungsbauführer (Referendar) in Saarbrücken, but before taking up his duties, he first did his military service as a one-year volunteer, which he did from April 1888 with the 8th Rhenish Infantry Regiment No. 70 in Saarbrücken. Afterwards, he was active in the state training service in the government district of Trier. Above all, he was involved in the construction of the new grammar school in Saarbrücken. He passed the Second State Examination on 28 February 1893. He obtained a position as Regierungsbaumeister (assessor) in the technical office of the structural engineering department of the Prussian Ministry of Public Works in Berlin. His work there was interrupted by a study trip to Italy, which he was able to finance through a state premium he had received on the occasion of his second state examination.

At the beginning of 1895 he was transferred to Breslau, where he married Wally Busse on 16 November 1895, with whom he had their daughter Elsa. Burgemeister received his doctorate in art history on 12 September 1901 with the thesis 'Die Jesuitenkunst in Breslau, insbesondere die Matthiaskirche und das Universitätsgebäude Breslau. In 1902 he was appointed Royal Inspector of Agriculture. After the first Silesian provincial conservator Hans Lutsch had been appointed to Berlin, Burgemeister became his successor in 1905. In 1909, he was promoted to Royal Building Councillor and in 1912 to Royal "Königlichen Regierungs- und Baurat befördert."

From 1909 to 1 October 1915, he was in charge of the royal "Hochbauamt Landkreis Strehlen", and during the First World War also of the "Hochbauamt Breslau I". On 1 April 1917, he left the civil service and became a provincial building officer in the building construction department of the provincial administration of the Province of Silesia. At the same time, he remained provincial conservator. He received several decorations and was appointed an external member of the Prussian Academy of Building in Berlin on 5 May 1922. Furthermore, Burgemeister was chairman of the expert advisory board of the municipal building police, board member of the Verein für Geschichte und Alterthum SchlesiensMember of the Board of Trustees of the Wroclaw Museum of Fine Arts, Member of the Board of the Historical Commission for Silesia and Second Chairman of the Silesian Association for Homeland Protection.

He retired on 1 April 1929; however, he remained provincial curator until his death. His successor was the art historian Günther Grundmann. According to the obituary of his successor, Burgemeister's professional life had three significant contents: his buildings, his publications and his monument preservation activities.

=== Buildings ===
Burgemeister exclusively created official buildings; in the years 1895 to 1903 these were mainly university extensions, which had mostly already been planned by others, for example by Georg Thür, or had to be oriented towards already existing building parts. From 1904 to 1911, the Technische Hochschule Breslau was built in the Neo-Renaissance style according to Burgemeister's plans. It is considered one of his main works. Burgemeister then had to prepare a design for the new building of the university's agricultural institute in Breslau's Hansastrasse. From 1913 to 1916, its wing buildings were erected; the central building followed later and no longer corresponded to Burgemeister's original plans. Burgemeister was also involved in the planning of the Oberpräsidialdienst building on Neumarkt; however, the design was largely the work of Baurat Loewe.

Burgemeister was responsible for the conversion and extension of the Płakowice sanatorium and nursing home as well as for the construction of new nursing homes for the provincial institutions in Lubiąż, Bolesławiec, Plagwitz and Lubin. He designed a gymnasium for the Provincial Welfare Institution Wołów, the new building of the so-called "home for cripples" with a workshop building and the director's residence in Rothenburg, and a former old people's home for Namysłów (today a primary school with bilingual departments). The children's convalescent home in Jannowitz, which was built from 1928 to 1931, also goes back to Burgemeister's plans, but was realised in a more economical form than originally intended.

=== Monument conservation ===
From 1905 to 1932, Burgemeister was provincial conservator of the province of Silesia, which was the first province in Prussia to undertake efforts to preserve historical monuments. A provincial commission for the preservation and research of the existing art monuments was founded there and the Register of Art Monuments of Silesia was published between 1886 and 1894. The register volume, which Burgemeister had worked on while still under Hans Lutsch's authority, did not appear until 1903, as did the Bilderwerk der schlesischen Kunstdenkmäler, in which Burgemeister was also involved. From 1905 onwards, he was responsible for the further development of Silesian monument preservation.

During the First World War, he also had the special task of advising on the confiscation of bells that were to be melted down for armament purposes. In this capacity, he was able to save several artistically valuable bells.

Furthermore, Burgemeister had to initiate the new edition of the inventory of the art monuments of Silesia, as Lutsch's first inventory had to be considered outdated and incomplete during his term of office. This work was far from complete when Burgemeister died at the age of 68.

Burgemeister was also responsible for the Provincial Conservator's picture archive with over 10,000 photos.

=== Publications ===
Burgemeister concentrated his scientific work on researching the art monuments in Silesia. In addition to architectural history, he was particularly interested in Silesian organs and log churches. He published several books in addition to his dissertation:

- Die Holzkirchen und Holztürme der preußischen Ostprovinzen, Schlesien, Posen, Ostpreußen, Westpreußen, Brandenburg und Pommern. Aufgenommen und gezeichnet von Ernst Wiggert und Ludwig Burgemeister. Berlin 1905.
- Das Breslauer Rathaus. Geschichtliche und bauliche Beschreibung. (with photographs by Heinrich Götz) Breslau 1913.
- Die gesetzlichen und behördlichen Vorschriften über Denkmalpflege. (published by the Provincial Commission for the Preservation and Research of Art Monuments) Breslau 1913.
- Das Bürgerhaus in Schlesien. Berlin 1921.
- Der Orgelbau in Schlesien. Straßburg 1925. (Studien zur deutschen Kunstgeschichte, H. 230.)

Burgemeister also wrote numerous essays, including:

- Die Matthiaskirche in Breslau. In Zentralblatt der Bauverwaltung, 19. Jahrgang 1899, pp. 563–566 (Numerized)
- Die ehemalige kaiserliche Burg in Breslau. In Zeitschrift des Vereins für Geschichte Schlesiens, Jahrgang 1902, p. 36.
- Schlesische Rathäuser. In Bunte Bilder aus dem Schlesierlande. Vol. 2, 1903.
- Das ehemalige Jacobkloster auf der Sandinsel zu Breslau. In Zeitschrift des Vereins für Geschichte Schlesiens, Jahrgang 1903, p. 37.
- Das Haus zur goldenen Krone. In Schlesiens Vorzeit, Neue Folge, vol. 3, 1904.
- Die Hedwigskirche und das Schloß in Brieg. In Schlesien 2, 1908/9, pp. 249–256
- Vom Brieger Piastenschloß. In Schlesische Heimatblätter 4, 1910/11
- Das Universitätsgebäude und die Matthiaskirche. In Erinnerungsblätter zum 100jährigen Jubiläum der Universität Breslau. Breslau 1911.
- Schlesische Holzkirchen. In: Schlesien 5, 1911/12, No. 15, pp. 409–411 (Numerized)
- Die Hochbergsche Kapelle bei der Vinzenzkirche. In Schlesiens Vorzeit, Neue Folge, vol. 6, 1912.
- Schlesische Kunst. In Schlesische Landeskunde, 2nd vol., 1913.
- Städte und Burgen. In Schlesien in Farbenphotographie, vol. 2, 1924.
- Die katholische Pfarrkirche in Rothsürben. In Schlesische Monatshefte 1, 1924, pp. 145–151.
- Die Orgeln der ev. Pfarrkirche zu St. Maria-Magdalena in Breslau. In Schlesiens Vorzeit, Neue Folge, vol. 8, 1924.
- Das altertümliche Breslau. In Grenzgau 2, 1925, H. 11, pp. 27–33
- Breslaus Wohnungswesen in alter Zeit. In Die Wohnungswirtschaft der Stadt Breslau. Denkschrift des Magistrats Breslau. Breslau 1927.
- Baugeschichte des Schlosses Falkenberg. In Geschichte der Herrschaft Falkenberg in Oberschlesien. Falkenberg 1929.
- Johann Christian Valentin Schultze (Schulz). In Bericht des Provinzialkonservators der Kunstdenkmäler der Provinz Niederschlesien, Neue Folge, vol. 2, 1927/29.

Burgemeister also published many articles in daily newspapers, especially in the Schlesische Zeitung.
