= Goochan =

Studio album by Wizard
- Released: 2007
- Recorded: House of Music Studio, Germany
- Genre: Power metal, speed metal
- Length: 54:25
- Label: Massacre
- Producer: Wizard & Dennis Ward

Wizard chronology
Magic Circle (2005)	Goochan (2007)	Thor (2009)

Goochan is Wizard's 7th studio album, released on 26 January 2007 by Massacre Records. A concept album with an ownwritten story. The story is said to be about the witch Goochan, who will try to save mother earth from armies from another planet (led by the "Pale Rider"), which tries to take over this planet. The story is also planned to be released as a book.

The album was rated a 3.75 out of 5 by The Metal Crypt.

== Songs ==
All songs written & arranged by Wizard
All lyrics written by Volker Leson

1. "The Witch of the Enchanted Forest" - 6:17
2. "Pale Rider" - 7:15
3. "Call to the Dragon" - 4:45
4. "Children of the Night" - 5:32
5. "Black Worms" - 4:00
6. "Lonely in Desert Land" - 5:52
7. "Dragon's Death" - 6:21
8. "Sword of Vengeance" - 4:05
9. "Two Faces of Balthasar" - 5:20
10. "Return of the Thunderwarriors" - 4:58

== Personnel ==
- Sven D'Anna – vocals
- Dano Boland – Guitar
- Volker Leson – Bass
- Sören van Heek – drums
