= Odin (Wizard album) =

Studio album by Wizard
- Released: 24 March 2003
- Recorded: Powerhouse Studio, Hamburg, Germany
- Genre: Power metal, Speed metal
- Length: 56:13 (regular edition); 66:15 (limited-edition)
- Label: Limb Music
- Producer: Piet Sielck

Wizard chronology
Head of the Deceiver (2001)	Odin (2003)	Magic Circle (2005)

Odin is a 2003 concept album about Norse mythology by the German power metal band Wizard.

It was later re-issued in 2015.

== Track listing ==
All songs written & arranged by Wizard. All lyrics written by Volker Leson.

1. "The Prophecy" - 5:19
2. "Betrayer" - 4:53
3. "Dead Hope" - 6:02
4. "Dark God" - 5:43
5. "Loki's Punishment" - 5:08
6. "Beginning of the End" - 4:01
7. "Thor's Hammer" - 5:01
8. "Hall of Odin" - 5:06
9. "The Powergod" - 5:21
10. "March of the Einheriers" - 5:40
11. "End of All" - 3:53

The limited-edition also contains the following songs:

1. "Ultimate War" - 4:52
2. "Golden Dawn" - 5:05

== Personnel ==
- Sven D'Anna – vocals
- Michael Maass – guitar
- Volker Leson – bass
- Sören van Heek – drums
