= Jane Torr =

Australian linguist and early education researcher

Jane Torr is an Australian academic in the fields of early childhood language and literacy development in home and early childhood education and care settings. She is an honorary associate in the department of educational studies at Macquarie University, where she has been teaching and researching for over 30 years. Torr's research draws on systemic functional linguistic theory to explore the relationship between context and meaning in adult-child interactions, and the implications for children's learning. She has published over 50 peer-reviewed journal articles and book chapters, as well as publications in professional journals.

== Biography ==
In 1976 Torr completed an undergraduate degree at the University of New South Wales majoring in English literature. Her Honours thesis took as its subject the medieval English mystic Margery Kempe. Torr completed a graduate diploma in linguistics at University College London in 1978. She then undertook her PhD studies at the University of Sydney under the supervision of M. A. K. Halliday in the department of linguistics. Her doctoral research focused on the language development of infants in the first two years of life.

In 1984 Torr was appointed as a tutor at the department of English and linguistics at Macquarie University. In 1990 Torr moved to the Institute of Early Childhood at Macquarie University, serving as the head of the institute from 2007 to 2009. Her research has been funded by grants including Australian Research Council Discovery grants and Macquarie University External Collaborative Grants. She retired in 2014 and continues her active research program in an honorary capacity exploring the language and literacy environments experienced by infants in early childhood education and care centres.

== Major contributions ==
=== Linguistics ===
Torr has employed systemic functional linguistic theory to undertake research in an area of national and international concern: the quality of early childhood education and care programs for children aged from birth to five years. Her efforts to record rich infant interactions were recognised by the Australian Research Council (ARC) in 2014 when the project 'Investigating educator-infant talk and infant-peer interactions in Long Day Care' was awarded an ARC grant worth AU$258,000.00 (Chief Investigators: Sheila Degotardi, Jane Torr, and Benjamin Bradley). This research has found an association between the professional qualifications of early childhood educators and their language choices when addressing infants, including their patterns of questioning, reasoning, and directing infants' behaviour.
Torr's 2008-2010 project 'Creche care and bilingual language and literacy development for children of newly arrived parents attending English language program' received $98,500 from Industry partners Lady Gowrie Child Centre NSW and NSW Adult Migrant English Service.

=== Early Childhood Education ===
Torr has taught in initial early childhood teacher education programs for over 25 years. Her language and literacy courses have sought to make SFL theoretical concepts accessible and relevant to early childhood educators. In 2018 she authored a booklet published by peak national body Early Childhood Australia titled Learning to Read, for an intended readership of Australian educators, parents and carers of young children.

In 2008-2009 Torr was a member of the consortium chosen via competitive tender by the Department of Education, Employment and Workplace Relations to write Australia's first national early childhood curriculum, the Early Years Learning Framework. She was part of the strand responsible for writing the language and literacy outcomes and assessment. The Council of Australian Governments (COAG) developed the Framework to "assist educators to provide young children with opportunities to maximise their potential and develop a foundation for future success in learning" (p. 5). Since January 2012 it is mandatory for the Early Years Learning Framework to be implemented in all early childhood services in Australia. The mandatory nature of the document has been reported to intensify the obligation to provide high quality professional learning opportunities, particularly for less experienced or less qualified educators.

In 2018, Torr contributed to a review of early literacy programs in NSW Public Libraries (led by Emilia Djonov and with Marie Stenglin), leading to the development of a Framework for all NSW library staff to guide and evaluate the early literacy programs they offer free to children under 5 years of age, and their parents and carers. As a part of the collaborative research project 'Developing a context-sensitive framework for supporting early literacy across NSW public libraries', their commissioned report highlighted research that can inform public libraries in developing effective initiatives for promoting early literacy in the communities they serve.

== Selected works ==
1. Torr, J. (2018). Learning to read. (Everyday Learning Series). Canberra, ACT: Early Childhood Australia.
2. Djonov, E., Torr, J., & Stenglin, M. (2018). Early language and literacy at public libraries: Framework developing and evaluating early literacy sessions. Department of Educational Studies, Macquarie University.
3. Torr, J. (2018). How 'shared' is shared reading: Book-focused infant-educator interactions in long day care. Journal of Early Childhood Literacy. doi: 10.11771468798418792038.
4. Torr, J. (2015). Language development in early childhood: Learning how to mean. In J. Webster (Ed.), The Bloomsbury companion to M. A. K. Halliday (pp. 242–256). London: Bloomsbury.
5. Torr, J., & Pham, L. (2015). Educator talk in long day care nurseries: How context shapes meaning. Early Childhood Education Journal. doi: 10.1007/s10643-015-0705-6.
6. Torr, J. (2007). The pleasure of recognition: Intertextuality in the talk of preschoolers during shared reading and with mothers and teachers. Early Years: An International Journal of Research and Development, 27(1), 77-93. doi: 10.1080/09575140601135163
7. Torr, J. (2004). Talking about picture books: The influence of maternal education on four-year-old children's talk with mothers and preschool teachers. Journal of Early Childhood Literacy, 4(2), 156-180.
