= Naphtali Wolf Tur =

Russian Hebraist

- Born: Vilna, Vilna Governorate, Russian Empire
- Died: 29 May 1885
- Writing career
- Language: Hebrew
- Genre: Poetry

Naphtali Wolf Tur (Hebrew: נפתלי זאב טור, romanized: Naftali Ze'ev Tur; died 29 May 1885) (Note: 8 June 1884, according to William Zeitlin.) was a Russian Hebraist of Jewish descent.

Born in Vilna, Tur settled in Warsaw, where he taught Hebrew and several modern languages. He was a talented poet; but, owing to his untimely death, most of his productions remained unpublished, including a collection of verse entitled Benot ha-shir. Those poems which were printed include Ha-yovel, a long poem in honour of Sir Moses Montefiore's centenary, Geveret ha-ḥeshbon, and El ha-ishah. Several of his poems were published in Avrom Ber Gotlober's Ha-boker or.

== Partial bibliography ==
- Ha-yovel. Warsaw: Isaac Goldman. 1884.
- "Geveret ha-ḥeshbon". Ha-Asif. 2. Warsaw: Isaac Goldman: 556–558. 1885.
- "El ha-ishah". Ha-Asif. 2. Warsaw: Isaac Goldman: 558–561. 1885.
- "Hegionei kayitz". Ha-Asif. 3. Warsaw: Isaac Goldman: 669–672. 1886.
- "Le-yedidi Hashem... / Ha-meshorer". Ha-Asif. 5. Warsaw: Isaac Goldman: 16. 1889.
