= Thor (Wizard album) =

Studio album by Wizard
- Released: January 31, 2009
- Genre: Power metal, speed metal
- Length: 49:26
- Label: Massacre
- Producer: Andy Horn

Wizard chronology
| Goochan (2007) | Thor (2009) |

Thor is the 8th studio album by Wizard, released January 31, 2009, by Massacre Records. It is a concept album about Norse mythology and the god of thunder, Thor. It was the first Wizard album with two guitar players.

== Track listing ==
1. "Utgard (False Games)" - 4:49
2. "Midgard's Guardian" - 4:27
3. "Asgard" - 4:13
4. "Serpent's Venom" - 4:44
5. "Resurrection" - 3:48
6. "The Visitor" - 5:53
7. "What Would You Do?" - 3:30
8. "Utgard (The Beginning)" - 6:35
9. "Stolen Hammer" - 4:32
10. "Lightning" - 3:29
11. "Pounding in the Night" - 3:30

== Personnel ==
- Sven D'Anna – vocals
- Dano Boland – guitar
- Michael Maass – guitar
- Volker Leson – bass
- Sören van Heek – drums
