= Thor washing machine =

Electric clothes washing machine

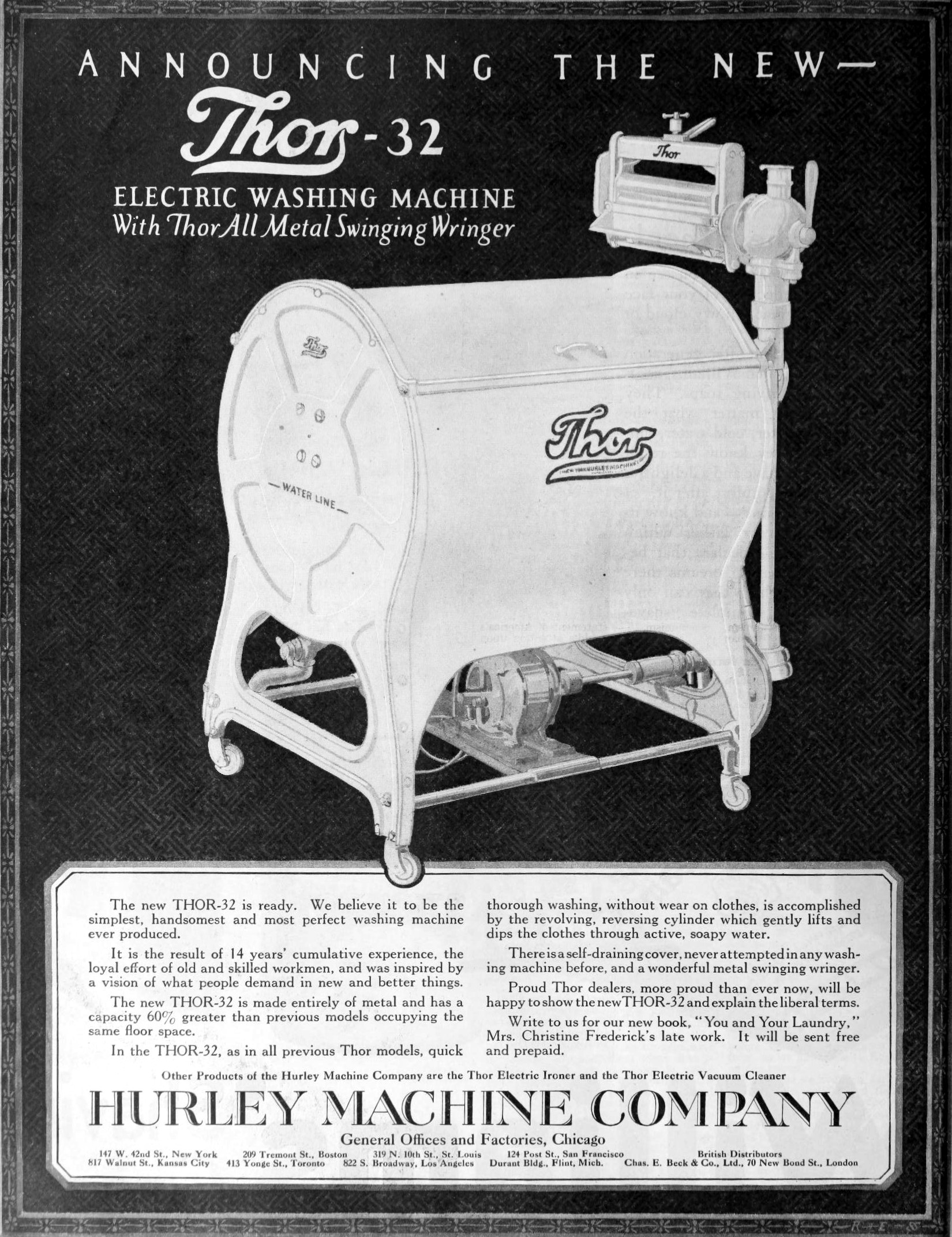
1920 advertisement for the Thor electric washing machine.

The Thor washing machine was the first electric clothes washer sold commercially in the United States. Produced by the Chicago-based Hurley Electric Laundry Equipment Company, the 1907 Thor is believed to be the first electrically powered washer ever manufactured, crediting Hurley as the inventor of the first automatic washing machine. Designed by Hurley engineer Alva J. Fisher, a patent for the new electric Thor was issued on August 9, 1910, three years after its initial invention.

The idea of an automatic washing machine had been around for many years. However, these were crude mechanical efforts that typically involved a manually operated crank or similar design. In many ways, the patent of the new Thor washer sounds modern, even today. The patent states that a "perforated cylinder is rotatably mounted within the tub containing the wash water". A series of blades lifted the clothes as the cylinder rotated. After 8 rotations in one direction, the machine would reverse rotation to "prevent the cloths from wadding up into a compact mass". Drive belts attached to a Westinghouse motor connected to three wheels of different sizes, which moved the drum during operation. The design also included a clutch, which allowed the machine to switch direction, and an emergency stop rod. The new Thor washer was mass marketed throughout the United States beginning in 1908.

== Controversy ==
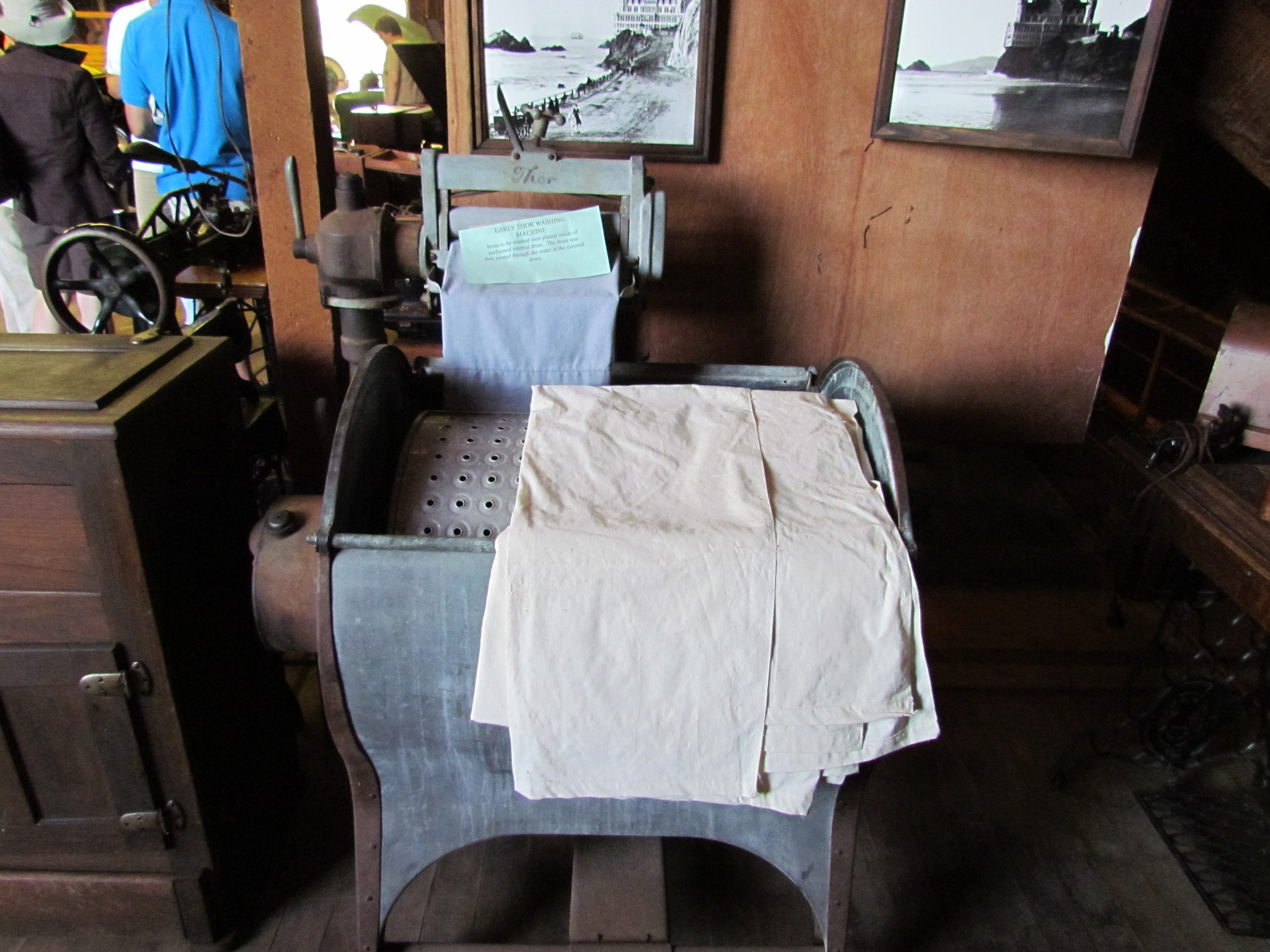
Penngrove Museum, CA

There is a dispute over who was the first inventor of the automatic washer. A company called Nineteen Hundred Washing Machine Company of Binghamton, NY, claims to have produced the first electric washer in 1906; a year before Thor's release. Additionally, it has been stated in various articles on the Internet that a Ford Motor Company employee invented the electric washer in late 19th century or early 20th century. Since Ford was incorporated in 1903, the Ford story seems unlikely to be valid. Regardless, Thor remains one of the first (if not the first) company to manufacture and sell an automatic washing machine on a large scale.

== Other Thor innovations ==
=== Tilt-a-whirl agitator ===
Thor invented the tilt-a-whirl system in which the agitator, typically in the shape of disk, tilted back and forth within the washer drum while simultaneously rotating. The early 1930s tilt-a-whirl design was the first agitator to move water in both a horizontal and vertical motion. The 1936 version of the Thor tilt-a-whirl incorporated sculpted hands embossed on the agitator. At the time, some Thor dealers painted the fingernails of the hands on demonstration machines.

=== Automagic washer/dishwasher ===
In the 1940s, Thor introduced the Automagic hybrid washer/dishwasher. The top-loading machine included both a removable clothes washing drum and a dish-washing drum. The Automagic was widely marketed but disappeared from the marketplace soon after its introduction, as many consumers soured on the idea of washing dirty clothing and dishes in the same machine.

=== Thor today ===
The Thor trademark was acquired in 2008 by Los Angeles–based Appliances International, a supplier of washer dryer combos and stacking washers and dryers. Soon after the brand acquisition, the company introduced a new line of laundry appliances under the Thor brand.
