= Airbus THOR =

2015 unmanned aerial vehicle by Airbus

THOR
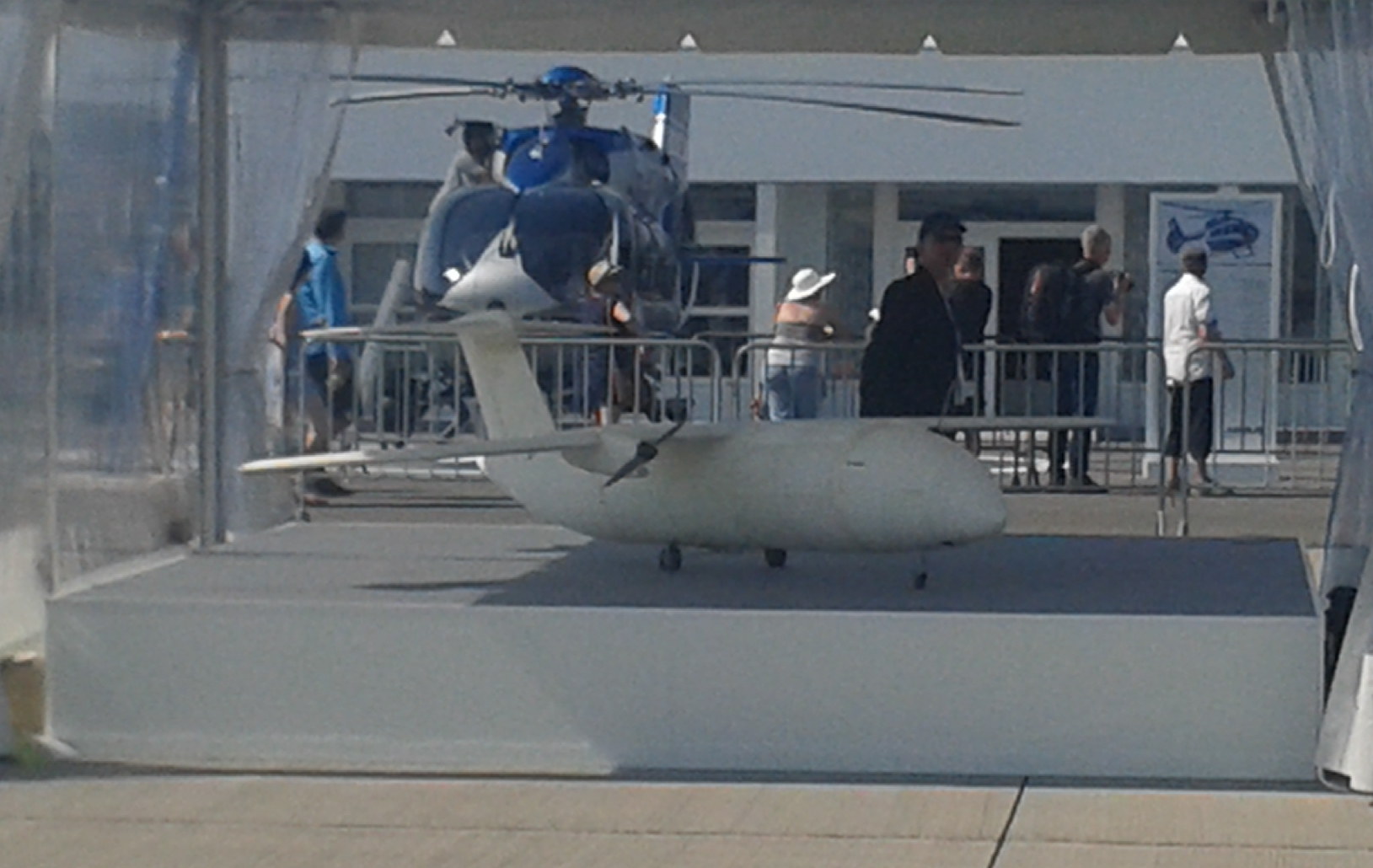

General information
- Type: Unmanned aerial vehicle
- Manufacturer: Airbus

History
- First flight: November 2015

The Airbus THOR (Test of Hi-tech Objectives in Reality) is an unmanned aerial vehicle (UAV) by Airbus partially produced through the process of 3D printing. It is possibly the world's second 3D printed aircraft, flying four years after the world's first in 2011, Sulsa. Presented for the first time at the 2016 Berlin Air Show, except the electrical engine parts, the drone-like model is entirely made by 3D printing from polyamide. Although still in beta phase, aircraft like THOR are intended to make flights more economical and safer.

THOR made its maiden flight in November 2015 near Hamburg where it passed most of the tests.

== Specifications ==
General characteristics

- Crew: 0
- Length: 4.0 m (13 ft)
- Empty weight: 21 kg (46 lb)
- Propellers: 2-bladed
