= Theatre History of Operations Reports =

Database of bombs dropped by the US military since World War I

Theatre History of Operations Reports or THOR is a United States Air Force historical ordnance database endeavoring to catalog every bomb dropped by the United States Armed Forces since World War I.

The officer overall responsible for the project is Lieutenant Colonel Jenns Robertson.

Apart from the project's historical value, the database is being used by the U.S. and other countries for practical purposes such as helping to locate possible unexploded ordnance in places like Germany, Vietnam and Iraq although data dating from 1991 onward is still classified for security purposes.
