= Secular building =

Building for secular purposes

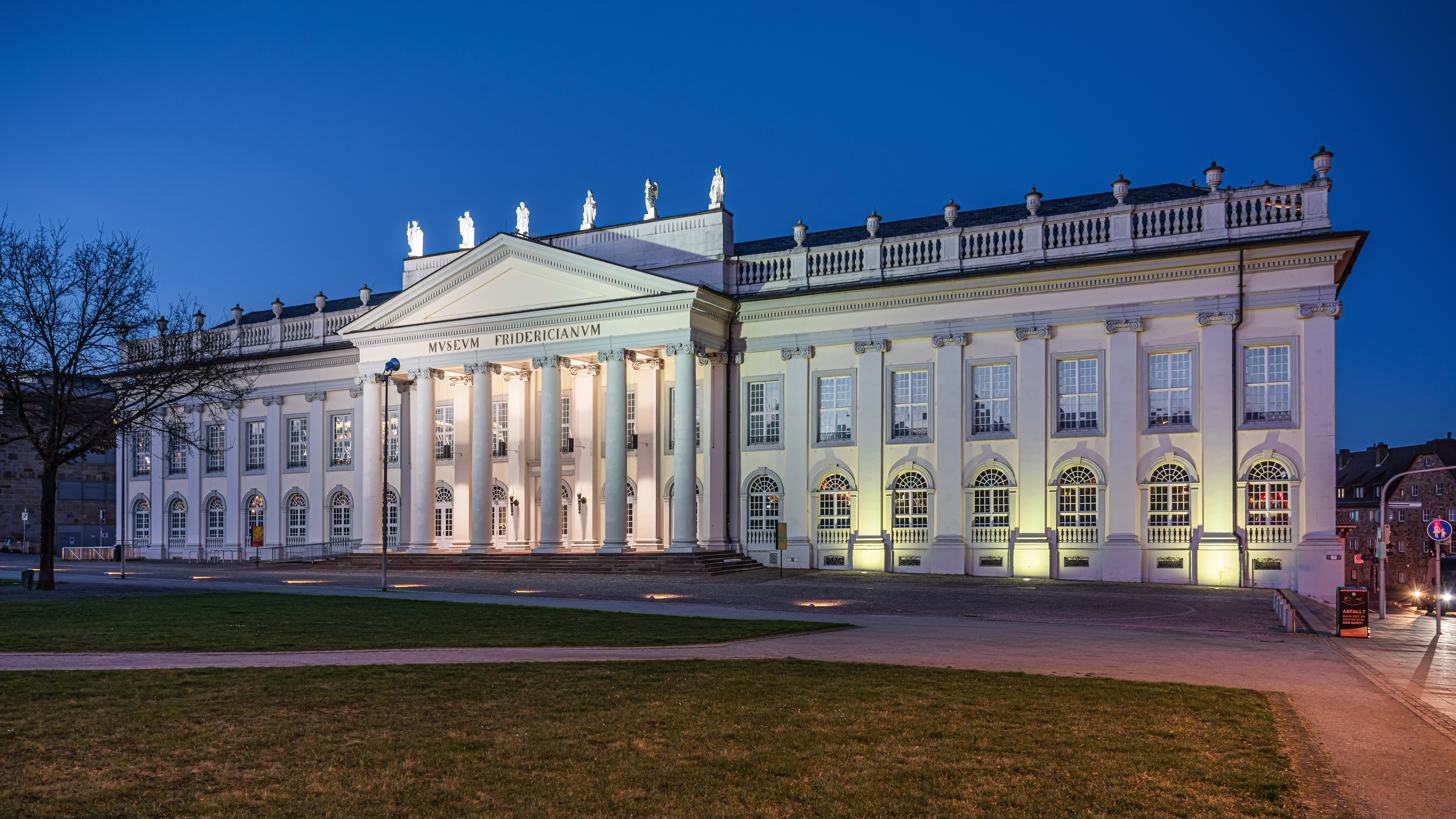
A secular building: The Fridericianum in Kassel, 1779, one of the first public museums in Europe.

A secular building is a building for secular purposes. The term is used in fine arts and the cultural science, for example in the history of architecture, to define the secular buildings and its usage from each other, and to standardardise.

The antonym of "secular building" is the "religious building", which clerical or religious purpose is reserved. Examples of secular buildings are museums, townhalls, university buildings and railway stations. The design and style of such buildings is often referred to as profane architecture.
