= ICGV Þór =

Four ships of the Icelandic Coast Guard have been named ICGV Þór.

- ICGV Þór (1926) was the first ship own by the Icelandic Coast Guard. Bought used in 1926 and stranded in 1929.
- ICGV Þór (1930) was built in Stettin, Germany, in 1922 as Senator Schäfer, but served the ICG from 1930 to 1939
- ICGV Þór (1951), an offshore patrol vessel. Served in all three Cod Wars conflicts between Iceland and the United Kingdom. Sold in 1982.
- ICGV Þór (2009), a Chile built offshore patrol vessel. Current flagship of the Icelandic Coast Guard.
