= HSwMS Thor =

Thor has been the name of at least two ships of the Swedish Navy:

- HSwMS Thor (1841), was a steam corvette launched in 1841 and decommissioned in 1887.
- HSwMS Thor (1898), was a coastal defence ship that was launched on 7 March 1898.
