= Tor (surname) =

Tor is a surname. Notable people with the surname include:

- George Tor (born 1989), Nigerian association football player
- Guilhem de la Tor (fl. 1216–1233), French jongleur-troubadour
- Margaret Tor-Thompson (c. 1962–2007), Liberian politician
- Tamy Ben-Tor (born 1975), Israeli visual artist
