= Georg Thür =

German architect

Georg Thür, complete name Carl Georg Thür, (5 October 1846 – 10 August 1924) was a German architect and Prussian official builder whose designs for university buildings had a decisive influence on the Prussian university landscape.

== Life ==
Thür was born in Berlin as the son of the council carpenter Karl Ludwig Thür - in early documents Karl Ludewig - (1810-1872) and his wife Marie Luise Thür Reimann. He grew up in his father's family together with his younger sister Luise in the carpenter tradition. His grandfather was already working as a carpenter's foreman at the Royal Friedrich Wilhelm Stud - today the Brandenburg Main and County Stud Neustadt/Dosse - in Neustadt an der Dosse. Karl Ludwig Thür, who was very enterprising, moved to Berlin at an early age. In 1833 he embarked on the Wanderjahre. It took him via Prague and Vienna to Munich, where he enrolled for a short time - from 26 October to December 1833 - in the Akademie der Bildenden Künste München to study architecture. By the end of December, he was back in Berlin, where he was issued a passport for a trip to Italy. The journey on foot took him from Berlin via Rome, Naples, Basel, Düsseldorf back to Berlin within six months in 1834. There he founded a company and a family from which Georg Thür emerged. His educational path followed the usual path for that time.

=== Childhood and youth ===
Thür attended the Friedrichswerdersches Gymnasium until Easter 1865, where he passed the Abitur. His career aspiration was architect. For one year he worked for Friedrich Schmidt-Ott as a building pupil. From 1860 to 1865 he took the drawing class (for free hand drawing) at the drawing school associated with the Academy of Arts, Berlin. From October 1866 to 1869, he attended the Berlin Bauakademie. In November 1869, he passed the Bauführer examination.

=== Beginning as an architect ===
After passing his examination as a builder in 1869, he was practically employed by Richard Lucae, Hermann von der Hude and Heinrich Strack in Berlin, Hamburg, Bonn and Frankfurt. He became a member of the Architekten- und Ingenieurverein zu Berlin-Brandenburg and took part in competitions for a memorial to the fallen in Calau as part of the association's "monthly competitions" (monthly competition June 1877), a funeral monument for privy councillor Koch in Thale and a funeral monument for privy councillor Stein in Stettin (monthly competitions November 1877 and December 1877), a funeral chapel (monthly competition April 1872), an interim church (monthly competition October 1874), a villa in Gera (monthly competition April 1878).

Finally, he was able to bring his career to a first high point with the study trip to Italy from 1874 to 1876, which was obligatory for architects at that time. Georg Thür embarked on the trip to Italy at the age of 28. It also took him to Athens, Constantinople and Vienna. In 1876, he spent at least half a year in Rome. Thür was in Rome a second time in 1905, and in total he stayed in Rome three times: on his great study trip in 1874–1876, furthermore in November 1905 and in 1911, when he accompanied Eduard Arnhold to Rome for the founding of the Villa Massimo.

=== Civil service ===
Efforts to found a German academy took him back to Rome in 1905, now to present his opinion as the Kaiser's representative in the decision about the location of an academy in Italy. The Prussian Ministry of Culture, i.e. ultimately the Emperor, initially rejected the idea of founding an academy so far away from Rome - Villa Falconieri in Frascati.

In 1910, Eduard Arnhold was able to buy the grounds of the Villa Massimo with the consent of the Emperor. On 11 February 1911, Eduard Arnhold, Friedrich Schmidt-Ott, Zürcher, the future architect of the Academy, Tuaillon and Thür discussed in Rome the future orientation of the buildings to be constructed. For Arnold, the founding of the German Academy Villa Massimo was the culmination of his work for the arts.

In 1884, Thür was called up to the Ministerium für öffentliche Arbeiten, initially as an "auxiliary worker" in the building department. He belonged to this until he left the civil service on 1 April 1919, with two short interruptions. First he was attached to the Imperial Embassy in London as a construction attaché from 1887 to 1889, then from 1893 to 1895 he held the rank of government attaché at the Regierungsbezirk Magdeburg. In Berlin came the appointments of Vortragender Rat and Geheimer Baurat in 1895, Geheimer Oberbaurat in 1898, and in 1904, at the inauguration of the Technische Hochschule Danzig, Wirklicher Geheimer Rat with the rank of Councillor First Class. Georg Thür was a state councillor for almost 50 years.tsbaubeamter.

In 1879, he was a co-founder and until 1880 a member of the Vereinigung Berliner Architekten. In the same year he got a job in the civil service in Berlin. From 1897 to 1900, he was a member of the board of the Berlin Architects' Association. In 1898 he succeeded Hermann Eggert as Geheimer Oberbaurat in the Prussian Ministry of Public Works. From 1899 onwards he was a member of the Prussian Academy of Civil Engineering; in 1904 he was Wirklicher Geheimer Oberbaurat; in 1905 he was awarded an honorary doctorateby the Technical University of Gdansk as Dr.-Ing. E.h. In his position as Baurat and later as Wirklicher Geheimer Oberbaurat and finally as Vortragender Rat in the structural engineering department of the ministry, Georg Thür supervised and designed 34 projects and buildings in Aachen, Berlin, Bonn, Breslau, Göttingen, Greifswald, Halle an der Saale, Hanover, Kiel, Marburg an der Lahn, Stettin, almost all university buildings.

On 1 April 1919, Thür retired at the age of 72. On 4 August 1924 he was admitted to the Provinzialheilanstalt Aplerbeck in Dortmund-Aplerbeck. He had been brought to Dortmund from Berlin at the instigation of his sister and nephew. Georg Thür died in the provincial sanatorium on 10 August 1924 at the age of 77.

== Awards ==
- 1902 wurde ihm von der Universität Breslau die Ehrendoktorwürde als Dr. med. h.c. verliehen.
- 1910 Porträtmedaille Wilhelms II.

== Buildings and designs ==
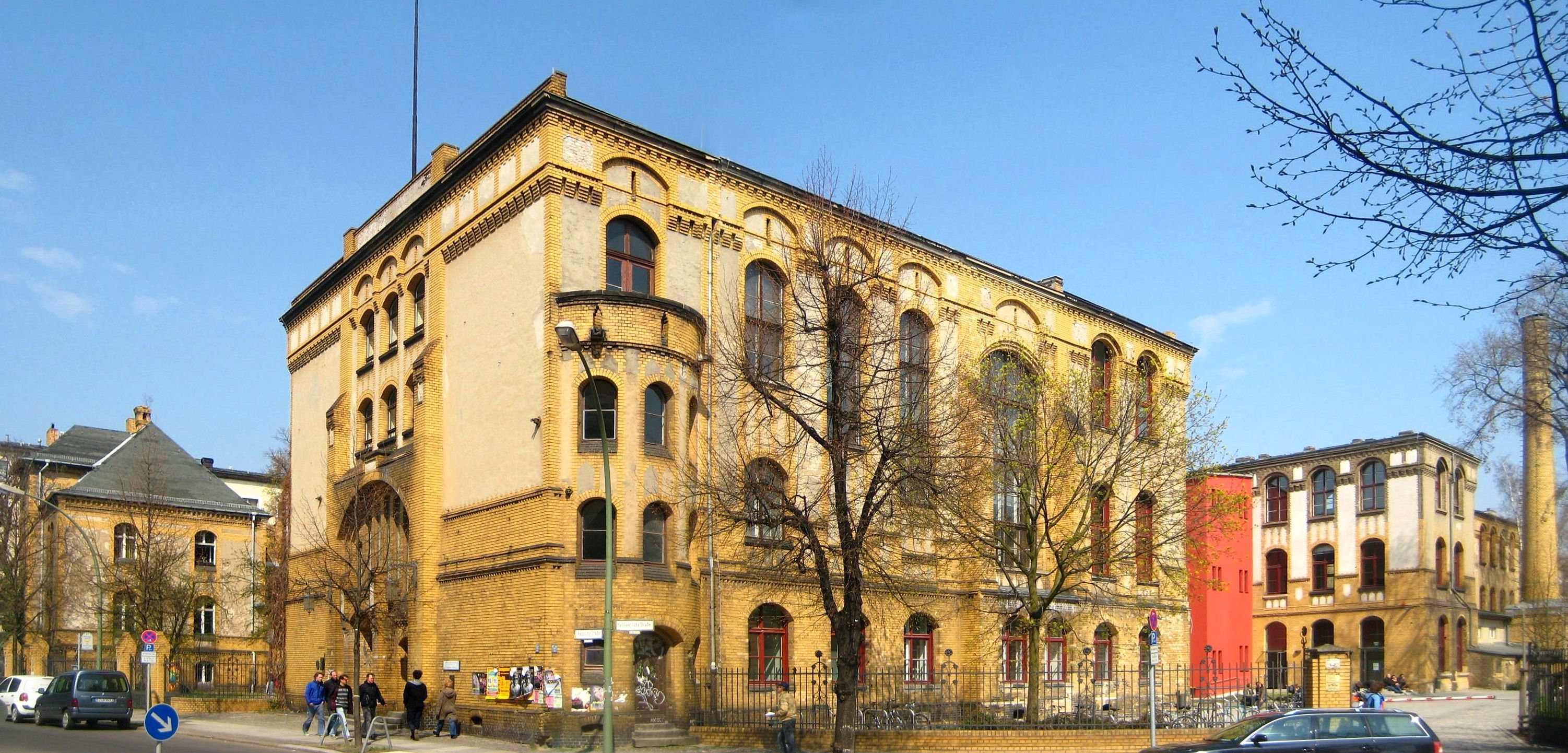
Chemisches Institut der Universität Berlin, design by Georg Thür and Max Guth

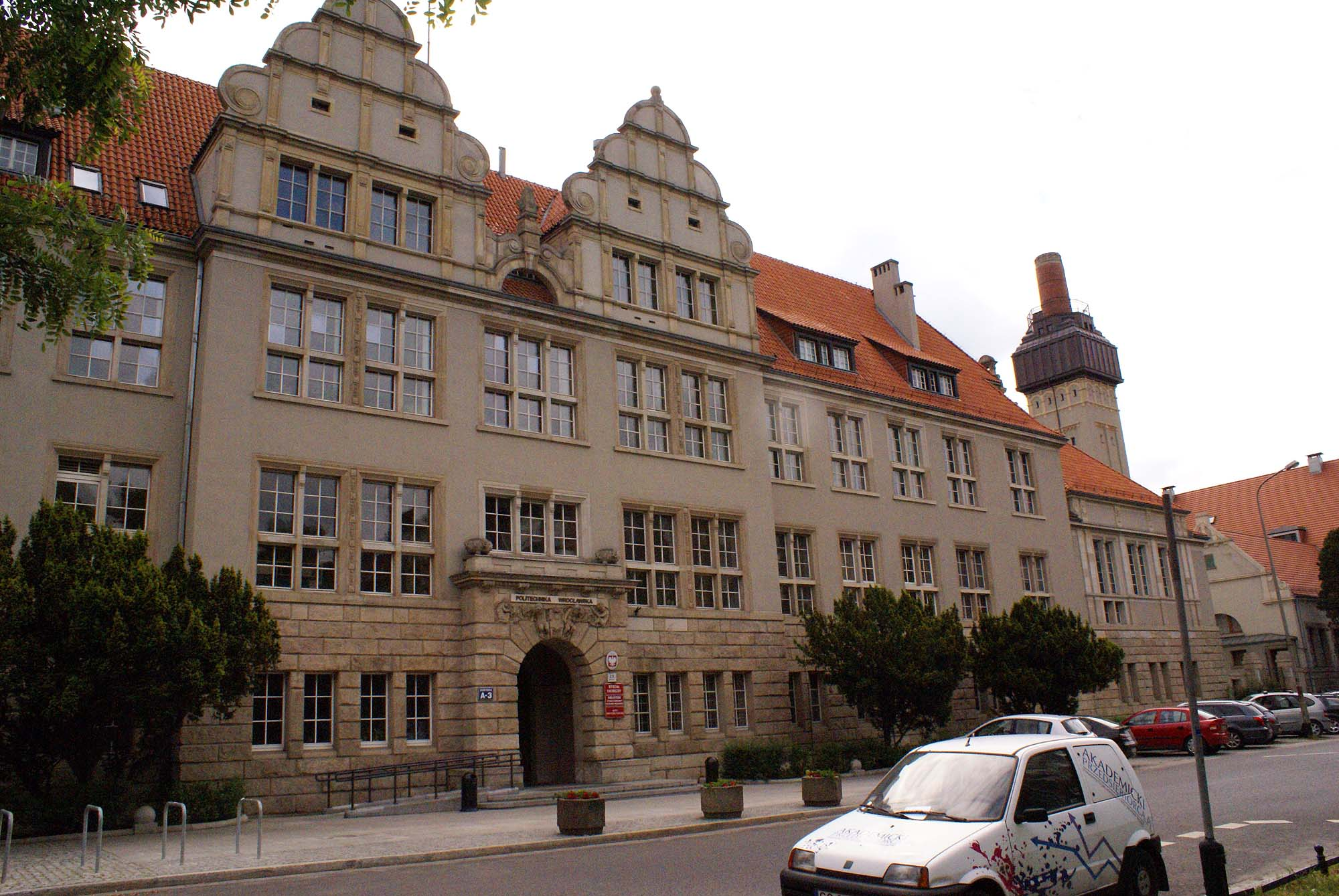
Technische Hochschule Breslau, design by Georg Thür

- 1899–1900: Chemisches Institut der Universität in Berlin, Hessische Straße 1–2
- 1902: Königliche Technische Hochschule Breslau, now Wrocław University of Science and Technology (Politechnika Wrocławska).
- 1902–1906: Forschungsgebäude der Charité in Berlin, Monbijoustraße.
- 1909–1911: private Krankenstation der Ida-Simon-Stiftung in Berlin.
- 1910–1912: Building for seminars and the archaeological Institute of the University of Göttingen (Nikolausberger Weg 15).
- 1911–1913: Sternwarte Babelsberg (ausgeführt unter Leitung von Hermann Eggert)
