= HNoMS Thor =

Three ships of the Royal Norwegian Navy have borne the name HNoMS Thor or Tor, after the Norse god of thunder Thor:

- HNoMS Thor (1872) was a monitor launched in 1872, and wrecked on the way to scrapping in 1919.
- HNoMS Tor (1939) was a Sleipner-class destroyer launched in 1939. In 1940 she was captured by the Germans and renamed Tiger. Returned to the Royal Norwegian Navy after the Second World War, she served until 1959, then sold for scrapping.
- NOCGV Tor is a Nornen-class patrol vessel commissioned in 2007 and currently serving with the Norwegian Coast Guard, which is part of the Royal Norwegian Navy.
