= Wizard (German band) =

German power metal band

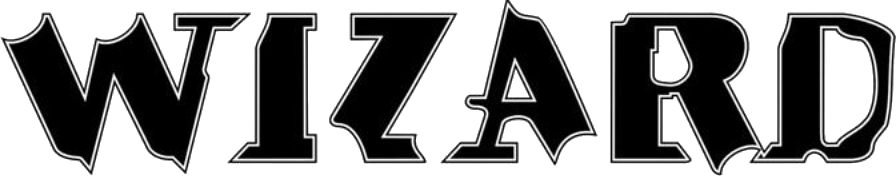

Background information
- Origin: Germany
- Genres: Power metal; speed metal; heavy metal; viking metal
- Years active: 1989–present
- Labels: Massacre; Limb; B.O.; Bow
- Website: legion-of-doom.de

Wizard is a German power metal band, formed in 1989 by the drummer Sören "Snoppi" van Heek. The band was often called "Germany's answer to Manowar". Most of the band's lyrics are about battles, metal, war and steel. There are some exceptions, for example Odin, which is a concept album about Norse mythology; Goochan, which is a fantasy story about a witch (written by Volker Leson and author William B. Nuke); Thor, which is also about Norse mythology; and ...Of Wariwulfs and Bluotvarwes, which is about vampires and werewolves (written by Wizard and Andre Wiesler, German author).

Wizard played at Wacken Open Air 2002, Bang Your Head!!! 2002, Keep It True 2004, Dokk'em Open Air 2006, Magic Circle Festival 2009 and is in the 2012 lineup of Hammerfest IV.

== History ==
In 2003 longtime guitarist Michael Maass quit the band because of health problems. Dano Boland became a new guitarist for the band in early 2004. In 2006 the band left the label Limb Music after three albums and joined the somewhat larger label Massacre Records, with a new album in mind to be released on 27 January 2007, titled Goochan. On 18 May 2007, Michael Maass returned to the band after a four-year break.

== Reviews ==
The band's 2009 album Thor received a positive review from The Pit reviewer Frank Heise, who praised "The Visitor" as the best track on it.

The band's 2011 album ...Of Wariwulfs and Bluotvarwes received a positive review from SLUG Magazine reviewer Dylan Chadwick noting that "well trodden, and admittedly formulaic, it's a resoundingly competent platter of steel-willed, fist pounding heavy metal that'll satisfy the most voracious headbanger's hunger."

== Band members ==
=== Current members ===
- Sven D'Anna – vocals (1989–present)
- Sören van Heek (Snoppi) – drums (1989–present)
- Michael Maass – guitars (1989–2003, 2007–present)
- Arndt Ratering – bass (2013–present)
- Tommy Hartung – guitars (2020–present)

=== Former members ===
- Volker Leson – bass (1989–2013)
- Dano Boland – guitars (2003–2020)

== Discography ==
=== Demos ===
- Legion of Doom (1991)

=== Studio albums ===
- Son of Darkness (1995)
- Battle of Metal (1997)
- Bound by Metal (1999)
- Head of the Deceiver (2001)
- Odin (2003)
- Magic Circle (2005)
- Goochan (2007)
- Thor (2009)
- ...Of Wariwulfs and Bluotvarwes (2011)
- Trail of Death (2013)
- Fallen Kings (2017)
- Metal in My Head (2021)

=== Compilation albums ===
- Louder Than the Dragon (2004)
