= Thor Power Tool Company =

Household and general stocks manufacturer

The Thor Power Tool Company was a manufacturer of tools, washing machines, motorcycles, vacuum cleaners, rotary irons, electric ranges, kitchen sinks, speed snips, electric shoe shine machines, and the Juvenator.

== History ==
Thor was founded in 1893 by four men: John D. Hurley, Edward Hurley, John Patrick Hopkins, and Roger Charles Sullivan. In 1894, another Thor brother, Neil C. Hurley Sr., was added to the Thor board of directors. The company would soon be organized and later known as the Independent Pneumatic Tool Company.

The railroad industry first brought success to Thor. Its first product was the "Thor" pneumatic hammer to pound rivets and drill holes for bolts used to fasten the fire box of a locomotive to its boiler. The name "Thor" referred to: Thor, the mythical god of thunder, frequently pictured as wielding a mighty hammer. The name became popular and spread to other company products. The first factory was part of what had been a corset factory in Aurora, Illinois. Soon, they occupied the entire building. Railroads continued to be the major customers of the company's pneumatic products during these early years. The Thor enterprise had been organized into two companies at first: one to handle manufacturing, and the other to handle sales. Although he took no part in the management, "Diamond" Jim Brady allowed his name to be used as President of the fledgling company for several years. It was a marketing ploy, for Brady was the nation's best known salesman and promoter at that time.

Thor soon acquired another factory, the Aurora Automatic Machinery Company. This company made parts for bicycles and motorcycles, including the Sears and Indian motorcycles. Part of this company was in Aurora and the other part was in Chicago. This acquisition took place near the turn of the century and the Thor Building in downtown Chicago came into being. Thor manufactured motorcycles from the early 1900s until 1918. It was Thor that introduced to the world the first sidecar for motorcycles. The decision to get out of the motorcycle business was entirely financial. There simply was more money to be made in tools, including the tools that made motorcycles, than the actual motorcycles themselves.

As the company grew during the first decade of the twentieth century, it made four prototypes of the Thor automobile between 1909 and 1910. The car, a giant six-cylinder touring car, proved too costly to produce profitably and the idea was dropped.

In 1906, Neil C. Hurley Sr., and his brother, Edward Hurley, formed the Hurley Machine Company. Their initial product was the first electric washing machine in the world, the Thor washing machine.

Although the tool company and the washing machine company were two separate entities, the name "Thor" had acquired a reputation for quality and dependability. It is unclear how these two Hurley brothers, Neil and Edward, received permission to use the Thor logo and name on its new venture, but the fact that another brother co-founded the tool company no doubt played an instrumental role. Perhaps the tool division felt that the use of the Thor name and logo on household products would provide good advertising. At any rate, the Hurley Machine Company was now in business producing Thor washing machines using the same logo that had been used by the Independent Pneumatic Tool Company and the Aurora Automatic Machinery Company for the Thor motorcycle.

There was never any corporate or financial relationship between the washing machine company and the power tool company. Neil C. Hurley. Sr., had retired from the board of directors of the tool company before assuming leadership of the Hurley Machine Company. The appearance of the Thor product name and the Hurley family name for both companies continues to cause some confusion, but at least it stayed within the Hurley brothers family and there never seemed to be any legal acrimony over the logo use among all three companies.

John D. Hurley, one of the co-founders of the Independent Pneumatic Tool Company, died in 1928. Ralph Cooper, a veteran with the company, headed the business until Neil C. Hurley Sr., succeeded him as president of the tool company, consolidating power under his name.

Shortly after introducing the electric washing machine, the two Hurley brothers, Neil and Edward, introduced the Thor rotary iron, commonly known as the "Gladiron" as opposed to the hand-held "sad irons" of the day that required stove top heating by the user. Several variations of the "Gladiron" were introduced. One model would serve as an actual attachment to the washing machine. These early washing machines had wringers at the top; by taking off the wringer and attaching the gladiron, the "woman of the house", or her domestic servant, could do their ironing above the machine. The other model was a portable stand-alone model. The Hurley Machine Company advertised heavily to women and the term, "woman of the house", aptly applies to the domestic position viewed by society of many women at that time. It is not used pejoratively and should not reflect the attitude of society towards women today. Both the washing machine and gladiron were big hits in households throughout the country and the world. The Arcade Toy Company made tiny replicas of both machines for doll houses.

In 1920, the Hurley Machine Company introduced the Thor vacuum cleaner, believed to be the first electric vacuum cleaner manufactured in the United States. Sometime during the 1920s, the Hurley Machine Company became a subsidiary of the newly formed Electric Household Utilities Corporation, still under the control of the Hurley brothers.

In 1929, the Hurley Machine Company acquired the Juvenator exercise belt product. This product would hook to any door and allow the user to slip the belt around their waist and vibrate their pounds away. While this should have proved dynamically successful, once the depression hit, like so many good products, the Juvenator disappeared from the marketplace in the early thirties.

Neil C. Hurley Jr. succeeded his father as president of Thor in 1944. Neil C. Hurley Sr., the co-founder of the company, died in 1948.

In 1953, the company recognized the impact of the Thor name and officially adopted it as the corporate title, Thor Power Tool Company. Using the established Thor logo, Thor Power Tool Company manufactured a broad line of industrial, service, mining, and household tools—some of which were operated by air, some by electricity, and some by gasoline.

Rotary pneumatic tools replaced the large, heavy piston type in 1928. New line followed new line as the years passed. Auto and aircraft makers succeeded railroads as Thor's biggest customers. In 1951, overseas manufacturing and distribution were expanded with the purchase of Armstrong-Whitworth and Co., in England.

In 1954, Thor acquired Speedway Manufacturing, makers of the Speedway line of tools, including the famous Silverline. Thor's other properties included the Cincinnati Rubber Manufacturing Company, a farm living research center near Huntley, Ill., and Drying Systems, Inc., which made smokehouses, among other items. By 1959, Thor Power Tool Company's annual volume had surpassed $30 million.

By the early 1960s, Thor Power Tool Company was acquired by the Stewart-Warner Corporation. A short time later, Neil C. Hurley Jr. died from a third heart attack, February 9, 1965, at the age of 54 and the Thor brand name almost died.

== New incarnation ==
In the early part of the twenty-first century, the Thor name and logo was resurrected on washing machines manufactured from Australia. The new company had no ties with the original company, other than the use of the Thor logo and name.
