= Thor Power Tool Co. v. Commissioner =

Thor Power Tool Company v. Commissioner
- Supreme Court of the United States

Argued November 1, 1978 Decided January 16, 1979
- Full case name: Thor Power Tool Company v. Commissioner of Internal Revenue
- Citations: 439 U.S. 522 (more) 99 S.Ct. 773; 58 L. Ed. 2d 785

Holding
- The Commissioner did not abuse his discretion in determining that the write-down of "excess" inventory failed to reflect petitioner's 1964 income clearly, since the write-down was plainly inconsistent with the governing Regulations.

Court membership
- Chief Justice Warren E. Burger Associate Justices William J. Brennan Jr. · Potter Stewart; Byron White · Thurgood Marshall; Harry Blackmun · Lewis F. Powell Jr. William Rehnquist · John P. Stevens

Case opinion
- Majority: Blackmun, joined by unanimous

Laws applied
- Internal Revenue Code

Thor Power Tool Company v. Commissioner, 439 U.S. 522 (1979), was a United States Supreme Court case in which the Court upheld IRS regulations limiting how taxpayers could write down inventory value.

Thor manufactured equipment using multiple parts that it produced. It capitalized the costs of these parts when produced. When it had inventories of parts in excess of production needs, the company's accounting practice was to write down those inventories, taking a loss based on management judgment.

However, IRS regulations accepted this "lower of cost or market" method for tax purposes only if the taxpayer could demonstrate a reduced market price, or the goods were defective or "subnormal". It did not permit companies to write down goods simply because they were not selling them.

In court, the company argued that its deduction for loss should be allowed for tax purposes because it was permitted for accounting purposes. But the Court upheld the IRS regulations, saying, "There is no presumption that an inventory practice conformable to 'generally accepted accounting principles' is valid for tax purposes. Such a presumption is insupportable in light of the statute, this Court's past decisions, and the differing objectives of tax and financial accounting."

== Effects ==
The Thor decision caused publishers and booksellers to be much quicker to destroy stocks of poorly-selling books in order to realize a taxable loss. These books would previously have been kept in stock but written down to reflect the fact that not all of them were expected to sell.
