= January 23 =

January 23 this year in various calendars
- Friday, 23 January 2026
Akan	Fofie
Armenian	7 Mehekani 1475
Aztec	Toxcatl 13, 1 Cipactli
Babylonian	3 Tebetu, 2336 SE
Balinese pawukon	Menga, Pasah, Sri, Keliwon, Tungleh, Sukra of Medangkungan, Sri, Dangu, Sri
Bengali	9 Magh, BS 1432
Chinese	Yin Fire Rooster・Bond Mansion; Wood Snake Year, Month 12, Day 5 (Dahan, 12 days until Lichun)
Common Era	23 January 2026 CE
Coptic	15 Tobi, AM 1742
Egyptian	12 Payni, 2774 NE
Ethiopian	15 Ṭer, 2018 Amätä Məhrät
French Republican	Décade I, Quartidi de Pluviôse de l'Année 234 de la République
Gregorian	23 January, AD 2026
Hebrew	5 Shevat, AM 5786
Hindu	Pūrvabhādrapada・Parigha; Solar: 10 Māgha, 1947 SE; Lunisolar: Pañcamī, Śukla pakṣa of Māgha, 2082 VE; Siddhārthin・5126 KY・1,872,598
Icelandic	Föstudagur, 1 Þorri 2025
Islamic	4 Sha'aban, AH 1447 (using tabular method)
ISO week date	2026-W04-5
Japanese	5 Shiwasu, Reiwa 8 (Daikan, 12 days until Risshun)
Julian	10 January, AD 2026 (AM 7534)
Julian day	2461064
Korean	5 Sodal, 4358 DE
Maya	13.0.13.5.1; 19 Muan, 1 Imix
Roman	ante diem IV Idus Ianuarias, MMDCCLXXIX AUC
Solar Hijri	3 Bahman, SH 1404
Tibetan	5 rgyal, shing mo sbrul 2152 or 1771 or 999

<<	January					>>
Su	Mo	Tu	We	Th	Fr	Sa
				1	2	3
4	5	6	7	8	9	10
11	12	13	14	15	16	17
18	19	20	21	22	23	24
25	26	27	28	29	30	31
2026

January 23 in recent years
2026 (Friday)
2025 (Thursday)
2024 (Tuesday)
2023 (Monday)
2022 (Sunday)
2021 (Saturday)
2020 (Thursday)
2019 (Wednesday)
2018 (Tuesday)
2017 (Monday)

January 23 is the 23rd day of the year in the Gregorian calendar; 342 days remain until the end of the year (343 in leap years).

== Events ==
=== Pre-1600 ===
- 393 – Roman emperor Theodosius I proclaims his eight-year-old son Honorius co-emperor.
- 971 – Using crossbows, Song dynasty troops soundly defeat a war elephant corps of the Southern Han at Shao.
- 1229 – The episcopal seat is moved from Nousiainen to Koroinen (located near the current centre of Turku) by the permission of Pope Gregory IX. The date is starting to be considered as the founding of Turku.
- 1264 – In the conflict between King Henry III of England and his rebellious barons led by Simon de Montfort, King Louis IX of France issues the Mise of Amiens, a one-sided decision in favour of Henry that later leads to the Second Barons' War.
- 1368 – Zhu Yuanzhang proclaims himself the Hongwu Emperor, beginning the Ming dynasty.
- 1546 – Having published nothing for eleven years, François Rabelais publishes the Tiers Livre, his sequel to Gargantua and Pantagruel.
- 1556 – The deadliest earthquake in history, the Shaanxi earthquake, hits Shaanxi province, China. The death toll may have been as high as 830,000.
- 1565 – The Deccan Sultanates defeat Rama Raya of the Vijayanagara Empire at the Battle of Talikota, resulting in over 100,000 casualties and the destruction of the capital Vijayanagara.
- 1570 – James Stewart, 1st Earl of Moray, regent for the infant King James VI of Scotland, is assassinated by firearm, the first recorded instance of such.
- 1571 – The Royal Exchange opens in London.
- 1579 – The Union of Utrecht forms a Protestant republic in the Netherlands.

=== 1601–1900 ===
- 1656 – Blaise Pascal publishes the first of his Lettres provinciales.
- 1719 – The Principality of Liechtenstein is created within the Holy Roman Empire.
- 1755 – Moscow University is established (12 January 1755 O.S.).
- 1789 – Georgetown College, the first Catholic university in the United States, is founded in Georgetown, Maryland (now a part of Washington, D.C.) when Bishop John Carroll, Rev. Robert Molyneux, and Rev. John Ashton purchase land for the proposed academy for the education of youth.
- 1793 – Second Partition of Poland.
- 1795 – After crossing the frozen Zuiderzee, the French cavalry capture 14 Dutch ships and 850 guns, in a rare occurrence of surrender of naval vessels to land forces.
- 1846 – Slavery in Tunisia is abolished.
- 1849 – Elizabeth Blackwell is awarded her M.D. by the Geneva Medical College of Geneva, New York, becoming the United States' first female doctor.
- 1870 – In Montana, U.S. cavalrymen kill 173 Native Americans, mostly women and children, in what becomes known as the Marias Massacre.
- 1879 – Anglo-Zulu War: The Battle of Rorke's Drift ends.
- 1899 – The Malolos Constitution is inaugurated, establishing the First Philippine Republic. Emilio Aguinaldo is sworn in as its first president.
- 1900 – Second Boer War: The Battle of Spion Kop between the forces of the South African Republic and the Orange Free State and British forces ends in a British defeat.

=== 1901–present ===
- 1904 – Ålesund Fire: The Norwegian coastal town Ålesund is devastated by fire, leaving 10,000 people homeless and one person dead. Kaiser Wilhelm II funds the rebuilding of the town in Jugendstil style.
- 1909 – RMS Republic, a passenger ship of the White Star Line, becomes the first ship to use the CQD distress signal after colliding with another ship, the SS Florida, off the Massachusetts coastline, an event that kills six people. The Republic sinks the next day.
- 1912 – The First International Opium Convention is signed at The Hague.
- 1919 – The First Regional Congress of Peasants, Workers and Insurgents is held by the Makhnovshchina at Velykomykhailivka.
- 1920 – The Netherlands refuses to surrender the exiled Kaiser Wilhelm II of Germany to the Allies.
- 1922 – The first successful treatment with insulin is given to 14-year-old diabetic Leonard Thompson.
- 1937 – The trial of the anti-Soviet Trotskyist center sees seventeen mid-level Communists accused of sympathizing with Leon Trotsky and plotting to overthrow Joseph Stalin's regime.
- 1941 – Charles Lindbergh testifies before the U.S. Congress and recommends that the United States negotiate a neutrality pact with Adolf Hitler.
- 1942 – World War II: The Battle of Rabaul commences Japan's invasion of Australia's Territory of New Guinea.
- 1943 – World War II: Troops of the British Eighth Army capture Tripoli in Libya from the German–Italian Panzer Army.
- 1945 – World War II: German admiral Karl Dönitz launches Operation Hannibal, the evacuation of areas along the eastern Baltic coast.
- 1950 – The Knesset resolves that Jerusalem is the capital of Israel.
- 1957 – American inventor Walter Frederick Morrison sells the rights to his flying disc to the Wham-O toy company, which later renames it the "Frisbee".
- 1958 – After a general uprising and rioting in the streets, President Marcos Pérez Jiménez leaves Venezuela.
- 1960 – The bathyscaphe USS Trieste breaks a depth record by descending to 10,911 metres (35,797 ft) in the Pacific Ocean.
- 1963 – The Guinea-Bissau War of Independence officially begins when PAIGC guerrilla fighters attack the Portuguese Army stationed in Tite.
- 1964 – The 24th Amendment to the United States Constitution, prohibiting the use of poll taxes in national elections, is ratified.
- 1967 – Diplomatic relations between the Soviet Union and Ivory Coast are established.
- 1967 – Milton Keynes (England) is founded as a new town by Order in Council, with a planning brief to become a city of 250,000 people. Its initial designated area enclosed three existing towns and twenty-one villages. The area to be developed was largely farmland, with evidence of continuous settlement dating back to the Bronze Age.
- 1968 – USS Pueblo (AGER-2) is attacked and seized by the Korean People's Navy.
- 1982 – World Airways Flight 30 overshoots the runway at Logan International Airport in Boston, Massachusetts, and crashes into Boston Harbor. Two people are missing and presumed dead.
- 1986 – The Rock and Roll Hall of Fame inducts its first members: Little Richard, Chuck Berry, James Brown, Ray Charles, Sam Cooke, Fats Domino, The Everly Brothers, Buddy Holly, Jerry Lee Lewis and Elvis Presley.
- 1987 – Mohammed Said Hersi Morgan sends a "letter of death" to Somali President Siad Barre, proposing the genocide of the Isaaq people.
- 1997 – Madeleine Albright becomes the first woman to serve as United States Secretary of State.
- 1998 – Netscape announces Mozilla, with the intention to release Communicator code as open source.
- 2001 – Five people attempt to set themselves on fire in Beijing's Tiananmen Square, an act that many people later claim is staged by the Chinese Communist Party to frame Falun Gong and thus escalate their persecution.
- 2002 – U.S. journalist Daniel Pearl is kidnapped in Karachi, Pakistan and subsequently murdered.
- 2003 – A very weak signal from Pioneer 10 is detected for the last time, but no usable data can be extracted.
- 2018 – A 7.9 M_{w} earthquake occurs in the Gulf of Alaska. It is tied as the sixth-largest earthquake ever recorded in the United States, but there are no reports of significant damage or fatalities.
- 2018 – A double car bombing in Benghazi, Libya, kills at least 33 people and wounds "dozens" of others. The victims include both military personnel and civilians, according to local officials.
- 2018 – The China–United States trade war begins when President Donald Trump places tariffs on Chinese solar panels and washing machines.
- 2022 – Mutinying Burkinabè soldiers led by Paul-Henri Sandaogo Damiba depose and detain President Roch Marc Christian Kaboré amid widespread anti-government protests.
- 2024 – Northwestern Air Flight 738 crashes after takeoff from Fort Smith Airport, Northwest Territories, Canada, killing six people.

== Births ==
=== Pre-1600 ===
- 1350 – Vincent Ferrer, Spanish missionary and saint (died 1419)
- 1378 – Louis III, Elector Palatine (died 1436)
- 1514 – Hai Rui, Chinese politician (died 1587)
- 1585 – Mary Ward, English Catholic Religious Sister (died 1645)

=== 1601–1900 ===
- 1622 – Abraham Diepraam, Dutch painter (died 1670)
- 1719 – John Landen, English mathematician and theorist (died 1790)
- 1737 – John Hancock, American general and politician, first Governor of Massachusetts (died 1793)
- 1745 – William Jessop, English engineer, built the Cromford Canal (died 1814)
- 1752 – Muzio Clementi, Italian pianist, composer, and conductor (died 1832)
- 1780 – Georgios Karaiskakis, Greek general (died 1827)
- 1783 – Stendhal, French novelist (died 1842)
- 1786 – Auguste de Montferrand, French-Russian architect, designed Saint Isaac's Cathedral and Alexander Column (died 1858)
- 1799 – Alois Negrelli, Tyrolean engineer and railroad pioneer active in the Austrian Empire (died 1858)
- 1809 – Surendra Sai, Indian activist (died 1884)
- 1813 – Camilla Collett, Norwegian novelist and activist (died 1895)
- 1828 – Saigō Takamori, Japanese samurai (died 1877)
- 1832 – Édouard Manet, French painter (died 1883)
- 1833 – Muthu Coomaraswamy, Sri Lankan lawyer and politician (died 1879)
- 1838 – Marianne Cope, German-American nun and saint (died 1918)
- 1840 – Ernst Abbe, German physicist and engineer (died 1905)
- 1846 – Nikolay Umov, Russian physicist and mathematician (died 1915)
- 1847 – Elijah Bond, American inventor and lawyer, patented the Ouija board (died 1921)
- 1853 – John Marks Moore, American politician (died 1902)
- 1855 – John Browning, American weapons designer, founded the Browning Arms Company (died 1926)
- 1857 – Andrija Mohorovičić, Croatian meteorologist and seismologist (died 1936)
- 1862 – David Hilbert, German mathematician and academic (died 1943)
- 1862 – Frank Shuman, American inventor and engineer (died 1918)
- 1872 – Paul Langevin, French physicist and academic (died 1946)
- 1872 – Jože Plečnik, Slovenian architect, designed Plečnik Parliament (died 1957)
- 1876 – Otto Diels, German chemist and academic, Nobel Prize laureate (died 1954)
- 1878 – Rutland Boughton, English composer (died 1960)
- 1880 – Antonio Díaz Soto y Gama, Mexican politician (died 1967)
- 1889 – Claribel Kendall, American mathematician (died 1965)
- 1894 – Jyotirmoyee Devi, Indian author (died 1988)
- 1896 – Alf Blair, Australian rugby league player and coach (died 1944)
- 1896 – Alf Hall, English-South African cricketer (died 1964)
- 1897 – Subhas Chandra Bose, Indian freedom fighter and politician (died 1945)
- 1897 – Margarete Schütte-Lihotzky, Austrian architect (died 2000)
- 1897 – Ieva Simonaitytė, Lithuanian author (died 1978)
- 1897 – William Stephenson, Canadian captain and spy (died 1989)
- 1898 – Georg Kulenkampff, German violinist (died 1948)
- 1898 – Randolph Scott, American actor (died 1987)
- 1898 – Freda Utley, English scholar and author (died 1978)
- 1899 – Glen Kidston, English racing driver and pilot (died 1931)
- 1900 – William Ifor Jones, Welsh organist and conductor (died 1988)

=== 1901–present ===
- 1901 – Arthur Wirtz, American businessman (died 1983)
- 1903 – Jorge Eliécer Gaitán, Colombian lawyer and politician, 16th Minister of National Education of Colombia (died 1948)
- 1905 – Erich Borchmeyer, German sprinter (died 2000)
- 1907 – Dan Duryea, American actor and singer (died 1968)
- 1907 – Hideki Yukawa, Japanese physicist and academic, Nobel Prize laureate (died 1981)
- 1910 – Django Reinhardt, Belgian guitarist and composer (died 1953)
- 1912 – Boris Pokrovsky, Russian director and manager (died 2009)
- 1913 – Jean-Michel Atlan, Algerian-French painter (died 1960)
- 1913 – Wally Parks, American businessman, founded the National Hot Rod Association (died 2007)
- 1915 – Herma Bauma, Austrian javelin thrower and handball player (died 2003)
- 1915 – W. Arthur Lewis, Saint Lucian-Barbadian economist and academic, Nobel Prize laureate (died 1991)
- 1915 – Potter Stewart, American lawyer and judge (died 1985)
- 1916 – David Douglas Duncan, American photographer and journalist (died 2018)
- 1916 – Airey Neave, English colonel, lawyer, and politician, Shadow Secretary of State for Northern Ireland (died 1979)
- 1918 – Gertrude B. Elion, American biochemist and pharmacologist, Nobel Prize laureate (died 1999)
- 1918 – Charlie Kerins, Executed Irish Republican (died 1944)
- 1918 – Florence Rush, American social worker and theorist (died 2008)
- 1919 – Frances Bay, Canadian-American actress (died 2011)
- 1919 – Hans Hass, Austrian biologist and diver (died 2013)
- 1919 – Ernie Kovacs, American actor and game show host (died 1962)
- 1919 – Bob Paisley, English footballer and manager (died 1996)
- 1920 – Gottfried Böhm, German architect (died 2021)
- 1920 – Henry Eriksson, Swedish runner (died 2000)
- 1920 – Walter Frederick Morrison, American businessman, invented the Frisbee (died 2010)
- 1922 – Leon Golub, American painter and academic (died 2004)
- 1922 – Tom Lewis, Australian politician, 33rd Premier of New South Wales (died 2016)
- 1923 – Horace Ashenfelter, American runner (died 2018)
- 1923 – Walter M. Miller, Jr., American soldier and author (died 1996)
- 1924 – Frank Lautenberg, American soldier, businessman, and politician (died 2013)
- 1925 – Marty Paich, American pianist, composer, producer, and conductor (died 1995)
- 1926 – Bal Thackeray, Indian journalist, cartoonist, and politician (died 2012)
- 1927 – Lars-Eric Lindblad, Swedish-American businessman and explorer (died 1994)
- 1927 – Fred Williams, Australian painter (died 1982)
- 1928 – Jeanne Moreau, French actress (died 2017)
- 1929 – Myron Cope, American journalist and sportscaster (died 2008)
- 1929 – Filaret Denysenko, Ukrainian religious leader, Patriarch of the Ukrainian Orthodox Church – Kyiv Patriarchate (died 2026)
- 1929 – Phillip Knightley, Australian journalist, author, and critic (died 2016)
- 1929 – John Polanyi, German-Canadian chemist and academic, Nobel Prize laureate
- 1930 – Tanya Savicheva, Russian child diarist (died 1944)
- 1930 – Mervyn Rose, Australian tennis player (died 2017)
- 1930 – Derek Walcott, Saint Lucian poet and playwright, Nobel Prize laureate (died 2017)
- 1930 – Teresa Żylis-Gara, Polish operatic soprano (died 2021)
- 1932 – George Allen, English footballer (died 2016)
- 1932 – Larri Thomas, American actress and dancer (died 2013)
- 1933 – Bill Hayden, Australian politician, 21st Governor General of Australia (died 2023)
- 1933 – Chita Rivera, American actress, singer, and dancer (died 2024)
- 1934 – Lou Antonio, American actor and director
- 1934 – Pierre Bourgault, Canadian journalist and politician (died 2003)
- 1935 – Mike Agostini, Trinidadian sprinter (died 2016)
- 1935 – Tom Reamy, American author (died 1977)
- 1936 – Jerry Kramer, American football player and sportscaster
- 1936 – Cécile Ousset, French pianist
- 1938 – Giant Baba, Japanese wrestler and promoter, founded All Japan Pro Wrestling (died 1999)
- 1938 – Georg Baselitz, German painter and sculptor (died 2026)
- 1939 – Ed Roberts, American activist (died 1995)
- 1940 – Alan Cheuse, American writer and critic (died 2015)
- 1940 – Joe Dowell, American singer (died 2016)
- 1941 – Jock R. Anderson, Australian economist and academic
- 1941 – João Ubaldo Ribeiro, Brazilian journalist, author, and academic (died 2014)
- 1942 – Laurie Mayne, Australian cricketer
- 1942 – Punsalmaagiin Ochirbat, Mongolian politician, 1st President of Mongolia (died 2025)
- 1942 – Herman Tjeenk Willink, Dutch judge and politician
- 1943 – Gary Burton, American musician
- 1943 – Gil Gerard, American actor (died 2025)
- 1943 – Özhan Canaydın, Turkish basketball player and businessman (died 2010)
- 1944 – Rutger Hauer, Dutch actor, director, and producer (died 2019)
- 1945 – Mike Harris, Canadian politician, 22nd Premier of Ontario
- 1946 – Arnoldo Alemán, Nicaraguan lawyer and politician, President of Nicaragua
- 1946 – Boris Berezovsky, Russian-English businessman and mathematician (died 2013)
- 1946 – Marie Charlotte Fayanga, Central African politician and diplomat (died 2021)
- 1946 – Silvia Monti, Italian actress (died 2026)
- 1947 – Tom Carper, American captain and politician, 71st Governor of Delaware
- 1947 – Megawati Sukarnoputri, Indonesian politician, 5th president of Indonesia
- 1948 – Anita Pointer, American singer-songwriter (died 2022)
- 1949 – Charlie Papazian, American nuclear engineer, brewer and author.
- 1950 – Richard Dean Anderson, American actor, producer, and composer
- 1950 – Guida Maria, Portuguese actress (died 2018)
- 1950 – Suzanne Scotchmer, American economist and academic (died 2014)
- 1950 – Luis Alberto Spinetta, Argentinian singer-songwriter, guitarist, and poet (died 2012)
- 1951 – Chesley Sullenberger, American airline pilot and safety expert
- 1952 – Omar Henry, South African cricketer
- 1952 – Jaroslav Pouzar, Czech ice hockey player
- 1953 – John Luther Adams, American composer
- 1953 – Alister McGrath, Irish priest, historian, and theologian
- 1953 – Antonio Villaraigosa, American politician, 41st Mayor of Los Angeles
- 1953 – Robin Zander, American singer-songwriter and guitarist
- 1954 – Trevor Hohns, Australian cricketer
- 1957 – Caroline, Princess of Hanover
- 1958 – Sergey Litvinov, Russian hammer thrower (died 2018)
- 1959 – Clive Bull, English radio host
- 1960 – Greg Ritchie, Australian cricketer
- 1961 – Peter Mackenzie, American actor
- 1961 – Yelena Sinchukova, Russian long jumper
- 1962 – David Arnold, English composer
- 1962 – Aivar Lillevere, Estonian footballer and coach
- 1962 – Elvira Lindo, Spanish journalist and author
- 1962 – Boris McGiver, American actor
- 1963 – Gail O'Grady, American actress
- 1964 – Jonatha Brooke, American singer-songwriter and guitarist
- 1964 – Mariska Hargitay, American actress and producer
- 1964 – Bharrat Jagdeo, Guyanese economist and politician, 7th President of Guyana
- 1965 – Louie Clemente, American drummer
- 1966 – Damien Hardman, Australian surfer
- 1966 – Haywoode Workman, American basketball player and referee
- 1967 – Owen Cunningham, Australian rugby league player
- 1968 – Taro Hakase, Japanese violinist and composer
- 1968 – Petr Korda, Czech-Monégasque tennis player
- 1969 – Andrei Kanchelskis, Ukrainian-Russian footballer and manager
- 1969 – Brendan Shanahan, Canadian ice hockey player and actor
- 1969 – Susen Tiedtke, German long jumper
- 1970 – Richard Šmehlík, Czech ice hockey player
- 1970 – Spyridon Vasdekis, Greek long jumper
- 1971 – Kevin Mawae, American football player and coach
- 1971 – Adam Parore, New Zealand cricketer and mountaineer
- 1971 – Claire Rankin, Canadian actress
- 1972 – Ewen Bremner, Scottish actor
- 1973 – Tomas Holmström, Swedish ice hockey player
- 1974 – Glen Chapple, English cricketer
- 1974 – Rebekah Elmaloglou, Australian actress
- 1974 – Richard T. Slone, English painter
- 1974 – Tiffani Thiessen, American actress
- 1975 – Phil Dawson, American football player
- 1975 – Tito Ortiz, American mixed martial artist
- 1976 – Brandon Duckworth, American baseball player and scout
- 1976 – Anne Margrethe Hausken, Norwegian orienteering competitor
- 1976 – Alex Shaffer, American skier
- 1979 – Scott Hannan, Canadian ice hockey player
- 1979 – Larry Hughes, American basketball player
- 1979 – Dawn O'Porter, Scottish-English fashion designer and journalist
- 1979 – Juan Rincón, Venezuelan baseball player and coach
- 1979 – Maria Stepanova, Russian basketball player
- 1981 – Rob Friend, Canadian soccer player
- 1981 – Julia Jones, American actress
- 1982 – Oceana Mahlmann, German singer and songwriter
- 1982 – Wily Mo Peña, Dominican baseball player
- 1982 – Andrew Rock, American sprinter
- 1983 – Irving Saladino, Panamanian long jumper
- 1984 – Arjen Robben, Dutch footballer
- 1985 – San E, South Korean rapper
- 1985 – Dong Fangzhuo, Chinese footballer
- 1985 – Doutzen Kroes, Dutch model and actress
- 1985 – Yevgeny Lukyanenko, Russian pole vaulter
- 1985 – Aselefech Mergia, Ethiopian runner
- 1985 – Jeff Samardzija, American baseball and football player
- 1985 – Sudaryono, Indonesian politician and businessman
- 1986 – Gelete Burka, Ethiopian runner
- 1986 – Marc Laird, Scottish footballer
- 1986 – José Enrique, Spanish footballer
- 1986 – Steven Taylor, English footballer
- 1986 – Sandro Viletta, Swiss skier
- 1987 – Leo Komarov, Estonian-Finnish ice hockey player
- 1990 – Alex Silva, Canadian wrestler
- 1991 – Steve Birnbaum, American soccer player
- 1992 – Reina Triendl, Japanese model and actress
- 1994 – Addison Russell, American baseball player
- 1996 – Keita Bates-Diop, American basketball player
- 1996 – Ruben Loftus-Cheek, English footballer
- 1998 – XXXTentacion, American rapper (died 2018)
- 1999 – Alban Lafont, French footballer
- 2000 – Fanni Pigniczki, Hungarian rhythmic gymnast
- 2001 – Olga Danilović, Serbian tennis player
- 2002 – Joško Gvardiol, Croatian footballer
- 2002 – Nicola Zalewski, Polish footballer
- 2004 – Julio Enciso, Paraguayan footballer

== Deaths ==
=== Pre-1600 ===
- 667 – Ildefonsus, bishop of Toledo
- 989 – Adalbero, archbishop of Reims
- 1002 – Otto III, Holy Roman Emperor (born 980)
- 1199 – Abu Yusuf Yaqub al-Mansur, Moroccan caliph (born 1160)
- 1252 – Isabella, Queen of Armenia
- 1297 – Florent of Hainaut, Prince of Achaea (born c. 1255)
- 1423 – Margaret of Bavaria, Burgundian regent (born 1363)
- 1516 – Ferdinand II of Aragon (born 1452)
- 1548 – Bernardo Pisano, Italian priest, scholar, and composer (born 1490)
- 1549 – Johannes Honter, Romanian-Hungarian cartographer and theologian (born 1498)
- 1567 – Jiajing Emperor of China (born 1507)
- 1570 – James Stewart, 1st Earl of Moray, Scottish politician (born 1531)

=== 1601–1900 ===
- 1620 – John Croke, English politician and judge (born 1553)
- 1622 – William Baffin, English explorer and navigator (born 1584)
- 1650 – Philip Herbert, 4th Earl of Pembroke (born 1584)
- 1744 – Giambattista Vico, Italian historian and philosopher (born 1668)
- 1785 – Matthew Stewart, Scottish mathematician and academic (born 1717)
- 1789 – Frances Brooke, English author and playwright (born 1724)
- 1789 – John Cleland, English author (born 1709)
- 1800 – Edward Rutledge, American captain and politician, 39th Governor of South Carolina (born 1749)
- 1803 – Arthur Guinness, Irish brewer, founded Guinness (born 1725)
- 1805 – Claude Chappe, French engineer (born 1763)
- 1806 – William Pitt the Younger, English politician, Prime Minister of the United Kingdom (born 1759)
- 1810 – Johann Wilhelm Ritter, German chemist and physicist (born 1776)
- 1812 – Robert Craufurd, Scottish general and politician (born 1764)
- 1820 – Prince Edward, Duke of Kent and Strathearn (born 1767)
- 1833 – Edward Pellew, 1st Viscount Exmouth, English admiral and politician (born 1757)
- 1837 – John Field, Irish pianist and composer (born 1782)
- 1866 – Thomas Love Peacock, English author and poet (born 1785)
- 1875 – Charles Kingsley, English priest and author (born 1819)
- 1883 – Gustave Doré, French engraver and illustrator (born 1832)
- 1893 – Lucius Quintus Cincinnatus Lamar II, American lawyer and politician, 16th United States Secretary of the Interior (born 1825)
- 1893 – William Price, Welsh physician, Chartist, and neo-Druid (born 1800)
- 1893 – José Zorrilla, Spanish poet and playwright (born 1817)

=== 1901–present ===
- 1921 – Mykola Leontovych, Ukrainian composer and conductor (born 1877)
- 1922 – René Beeh, Alsatian painter and draughtsman (born 1886)
- 1922 – Arthur Nikisch, Hungarian conductor and academic (born 1855)
- 1923 – Max Nordau, Austrian physician and author (born 1849)
- 1931 – Anna Pavlova, Russian-English ballerina (born 1881)
- 1937 – Orso Mario Corbino, Italian physicist and politician (born 1876)
- 1939 – Matthias Sindelar, Austrian footballer and manager (born 1903)
- 1943 – Alexander Woollcott, American actor, playwright, and critic (born 1887)
- 1944 – Edvard Munch, Norwegian painter and illustrator (born 1863)
- 1947 – Pierre Bonnard, French painter (born 1867)
- 1956 – Alexander Korda, Hungarian-English director and producer (born 1893)
- 1963 – Józef Gosławski, Polish sculptor (born 1908)
- 1966 – T. M. Sabaratnam, Sri Lankan lawyer and politician (born 1895)
- 1971 – Fritz Feigl, Austrian-Brazilian chemist and academic (born 1871)
- 1973 – Laura Negley, American politician, member of the Texas House of Representatives (born 1890)
- 1973 – Alexander Onassis, American-Greek businessman (born 1948)
- 1973 – Kid Ory, American trombonist, composer, and bandleader (born 1886)
- 1976 – Paul Robeson, American actor, singer, and activist (born 1898)
- 1977 – Toots Shor, American businessman, founded Toots Shor's Restaurant (born 1903)
- 1978 – Terry Kath, American guitarist and songwriter (born 1946)
- 1978 – Jack Oakie, American actor (born 1903)
- 1980 – Giovanni Michelotti, Italian engineer (born 1921)
- 1981 – Samuel Barber, American pianist and composer (born 1910)
- 1983 – Fred Bakewell, English cricketer and coach (born 1908)
- 1984 – Muin Bseiso, Palestinian-Egyptian poet and critic (born 1926)
- 1985 – James Beard, American chef and cookbook author for whom the James Beard Foundation Awards are named (born 1905)
- 1986 – Joseph Beuys, German sculptor and painter (born 1921)
- 1988 – Charles Glen King, American biochemist and academic (born 1896)
- 1989 – Salvador Dalí, Spanish painter and sculptor (born 1904)
- 1989 – Lars-Erik Torph, Swedish race car driver (born 1961)
- 1990 – Allen Collins, American guitarist and songwriter (born 1952)
- 1991 – Northrop Frye, Canadian author and critic (born 1912)
- 1992 – Freddie Bartholomew, American actor (born 1924)
- 1993 – Keith Laumer, American soldier, author, and diplomat (born 1925)
- 1994 – Nikolai Ogarkov, Russian field marshal (born 1917)
- 1994 – Brian Redhead, English journalist and author (born 1929)
- 1999 – Joe D'Amato, Italian director and cinematographer (born 1936)
- 1999 – Jay Pritzker, American businessman, co-founded the Hyatt Corporation (born 1922)
- 2002 – Paul Aars, American race car driver (born 1934)
- 2002 – Pierre Bourdieu, French sociologist, anthropologist, and philosopher (born 1930)
- 2002 – Robert Nozick, American philosopher, author, and academic (born 1938)
- 2003 – Nell Carter, American actress and singer (born 1948)
- 2004 – Helmut Newton, German-Australian photographer (born 1920)
- 2005 – Johnny Carson, American talk show host, television personality, and producer (born 1925)
- 2007 – Syed Hussein Alatas, Malaysian sociologist and politician (born 1928)
- 2009 – Robert W. Scott, American farmer and politician, 67th Governor of North Carolina (born 1929)
- 2013 – Józef Glemp, Polish cardinal (born 1929)
- 2014 – Yuri Izrael, Russian meteorologist and journalist (born 1930)
- 2014 – Elmira Nazirova, Azerbaijani composer (born 1928)
- 2015 – Ernie Banks, American baseball player and coach (born 1931)
- 2015 – Prosper Ego, Dutch activist, founded the Oud-Strijders Legioen (born 1927)
- 2015 – Abdullah of Saudi Arabia (born 1924)
- 2018 – Hugh Masekela, South African trumpeter, composer and singer (born 1939)
- 2018 – Wyatt Tee Walker, American civil rights activist and pastor (born 1928)
- 2019 – Aloysius Pang, Singaporean actor (born 1990)
- 2019 – Oliver Mtukudzi, Zimbabwean Afro Jazz musician (born 1952)
- 2021 – Hal Holbrook, American actor and director (born 1925)
- 2021 – Larry King, American journalist and talk show host (born 1933)
- 2021 – Song Yoo-jung, South Korean actress and model (born 1994)
- 2024 – Charles Osgood, American radio and television commentator, writer and musician (born 1933)
- 2024 – Melanie Safka, American Emmy winning singer-songwriter (born 1947)

== Holidays and observances ==
- Bounty Day (Pitcairn Islands)
- Christian feast day:
  - Abakuh
  - Marianne of Molokai
  - Emerentiana
  - Espousals of the Blessed Virgin Mary
  - Ildefonsus of Toledo
  - Phillips Brooks (Episcopal Church (USA))
  - January 23 (Eastern Orthodox liturgics)
- Netaji Subhas Chandra Bose's Jayanti (Assam, Orissa, Tripura, and West Bengal, India)
- World Freedom Day (Taiwan and South Korea)
