= Toos (given name) =

Toos is a Dutch feminine given name (pronounced /toːs/). It is a hypocorism of either Catharina (via Cato) or Antonia. Tooske is a diminutive. In the United States it is among several variants of Antonia, including Toni, Tona, Tonia, Tonie, Tony and Tonya.

== People called Toos ==
- Toos Beumer (Catharina Johanna Beumer, born 1947), Dutch swimmer
- Toos Faber-de Heer (1929–2020), a Dutch journalist
- Toos Goorhuis-Tjalsma (1915–2004), Dutch originator of the Pieterpad walking route
- Toos Roodzant, (Catharina Roodzant, 1896–1999), Dutch chess master
- Toos van der Ende (Catharina van der Endeborn, born 1945), Dutch rower
- Toos van der Klaauw (Catharina Maria van der Klaauw, 1915–2011), Dutch fencer
- Toos van der Valk (born 1931), Dutch kidnapping victim

== People called Tooske ==
- Tooske Ragas (Antonia Grietje Ragas-Breugem née Breugem, born 1974), Dutch actress and television host

== See also ==
- Too (disambiguation)
- Toon (name)
- Toos (disambiguation)
- Toosa
- Toot (disambiguation)
- Toots (disambiguation)
