= Ton (disambiguation) =

A ton is a unit of mass, force, volume, energy or power.

Ton or TON may also refer to:

== Organizations ==
- Trots op Nederland (Proud of the Netherlands), a Dutch political party
- Tajna Organizacja Nauczycielska (Secret Teaching Organization), Polish underground educators during World War II

== People ==
- Ton (given name), a Dutch short form of Anton
- Ton (surname)
- Tôn, a Vietnamese surname (equivalent to Sun)

== Places ==
=== Europe ===
- -ton, a common feature in British toponymy
- Ton (river), river in Belgium and France
- Ton, Trentino, Italy; a commune
- Tôň, a village in Slovakia
- Ton Pentre

=== Elsewhere ===
- Tonga (by ISO 3166 country code)
- Ton, Burkina Faso
- Ton, Myanmar

== Science and technology ==
- The Open Network, a decentralized computer network
- Ton of refrigeration, unit of power of cooling systems
- Tonantzintla Catalogue (TON), an astronomical catalogue
- Turnover number, a concept in chemical kinetics

== Sports ==
- Ton, a century in cricket
- Ton, a century break in snooker

== Transport ==
- Tonbridge railway station, Kent, England, by National Rail station code

== Other uses ==
- Ton (society), the British high society during the Regency era
- Ton class, used to classify yachts

== See also ==
- Taun (disambiguation)
- Toe (disambiguation)
- Toi (disambiguation)
- Tonn (disambiguation)
- Tonne (disambiguation)
- Tono (disambiguation)
- Tons (disambiguation)
- Tonton (disambiguation)
- Toon (disambiguation)
- Tone (disambiguation)
