= Toos =

Toos may refer to:

- Toos (given name) including a list of people with the name
- Tous, Iran, or Toos, an ancient city in Razavi Khorasan Province in Iran
- Toos, later merged into Schönholzerswilen, a municipality in Münchwilen district, Thurgau, Switzerland

== See also ==
- Toes (disambiguation)
- Too (disambiguation)
- Tool (disambiguation)
- Toot (disambiguation)
- Toon (disambiguation)
- Toots (disambiguation)
- Topos (disambiguation)
- TOS (disambiguation)
