= Toe (disambiguation) =

A toe is a digit of the foot of a human or animal.

Toe or TOE may also refer to:

== Geography ==
- North Toe River, a large stream in the North Carolina High Country, in the United States
- South Toe River, a stream in Yancey County in Western North Carolina, United States
- The Toe, a landmark on Nelson Island in the South Shetland Islands

== Arts, entertainment, and media ==
- Toe (band), a Japanese post-rock band
- Tales of Eternia, a roleplaying game

== Computing and technology ==
- TOE, the Specific Area Message Encoding code for a 911 Telephone Outage Emergency
- TCP offload engine, a technology used by Ethernet network interface cards (NICs)
- Target of Evaluation (TOE), the subject of a Common Criteria security evaluation
- Toe, the low end of a characteristic response curve in photography

== Science and mathematics ==
- Toé, a common South American name for Datura and related plants
- Glacier terminus, also known as its toe
- Theory of everything, a hypothetical all-encompassing framework of physics
- Theory of evolution
- Transesophageal echocardiogram, a medical investigation using an ultrasound probe
- Truncated octahedron, a uniform polyhedron

== Other uses ==
- Toe (name)
- Toe (automotive), the angle of a wheel relative to its vehicle's longitudinal axis
- Table of organization and equipment (TOE or TO&E)
- Terms of employment
- Texas, Oklahoma and Eastern Railroad
- Tonne of oil equivalent

== See also ==
- Tic Tac Toe (band)
- Tic-tac-toe
- Toes (disambiguation)
- Ton (disambiguation)
- Tow (disambiguation)
