= Too =

Too or TOO may refer to:

- Target of opportunity, a concept in targeting
- Threshold of originality, a concept in copyright law
- Too (Fantastic Plastic Machine album), the fourth studio album by Fantastic Plastic Machine
- Too (Fidlar album), the second studio album by American skate punk band Fidlar
- Too (Kingdom Come album), the seventh album by the band Kingdom Come
- Too (Madita album), the second solo album by Matida
- Too (S.O.S. Band album), the second album by the band The S.O.S. Band
- To1, a South Korean boy band, formerly known as TOO

== People with the surname Too ==
- David Kimutai Too (1968–2008), a Kenyan politician and National Assembly member for the Orange Democratic Movement
- Naomi Too, Kenyan volleyball player
- Too Too (1990–2023), a Burmese fighter

== See also ==
- To
- Toon (disambiguation)
- Toos (disambiguation)
- Tootoo, an Inuit surname
- TU (disambiguation)
- Two (disambiguation)
