= Toots =

Toots may refer to:

== People ==
- Toots (nickname)
- Adalbert Toots (1910–1948), Estonian wrestler
- Aleksander Toots (born 1969), deputy director of the Estonian Internal Security Service
- Arved Toots (1930–1992), Estonian agronomist and breeder of Tori horses
- Villu Toots (1916–1993), Estonian calligrapher, book designer, educator, palaeograph and author

== Arts and entertainment ==
=== Fictional characters ===
- Toots, a character in Bunty, a British comic anthology
- Toots, one of The Bash Street Kids, a comic strip in the British comic book The Beano
- Toots, a title character of Toots and Casper, an American comic strip
- Joosep Toots, one of the main characters in Oskar Luts's novels Kevade, Suvis, and Sügis

=== Other uses in arts and entertainment ===
- Toots (film), a 2006 documentary about restaurateur Toots Shor
- Toots and the Maytals, a Jamaican band

== Other uses ==
- 13079 Toots, an asteroid named after musician Toots Thielemans
- Folkerts SK-2, a racing airplane nicknamed "Toots"

== See also ==
- Toos (disambiguation)
- Toot (disambiguation)
- Tootsie (disambiguation)
