= Tootsie (disambiguation) =

Tootsie is a 1982 comedy film directed by Sydney Pollack.

Tootsie, Tootsies, or Tootsie's may also refer to:

- Tootsie Roll Industries, American candy manufacturing company
  - Tootsie Roll, their namesake candy
  - Tootsie Pops
  - Tootsie Caramel Apple Pops
- Tootsie (musical), a musical adaptation of the film
- Tootsie (nickname)
- Tootsie Duvall, American actress
- Tootsie Guevarra (born 1980), Filipino recording artist and actress
- Tootsie Tomanetz (born 1935), American pitmaster
- Tootsie, fictional character from British children's program CBeebies
- "Tootsies", Gucci Mane and Lil Baby song from Woptober II
- "tootsies", a common slang term for the feet
- Tootsies and Tamales, 1919 film
- Tootsie's Cabaret, adult club in Miami, Florida
- Tootsie's Orchid Lounge, bar in Nashville, Tennessee
- TootsieToy, toy vehicle manufacturer
- "Toot, Toot, Tootsie (Goo' Bye!)", 1922 song

== See Also ==
- "Tootsee Roll", song by 69 Boyz, 1994
- Tootsi
- Tutsi
- Toot (disambiguation)
- Toots (disambiguation)
