= Toot =

Toot may refer to:

== Places ==
- Toot or Tut, Markazi, a village in Iran
- Mount Victoria Tunnel, a road tunnel in Wellington, New Zealand, colloquially known as "Toot Tunnel"
- Toot Oilfield, an oil field in northern Pakistan

== People with the name ==
- Don Cahoon (born 1949), American retired college ice hockey coach, nicknamed "Toot"
- Madelyn Dunham (1922–2008), grandmother of U.S. president Barack Obama, nicknamed "Toot"

== Fictional characters ==
- Toot, the title character of Toot the Tiny Tugboat, a British children's animated television series
- Toot, in Holly Hobbie's Toot & Puddle children's book series
- Toot Braunstein, in the animated series Drawn Together

== Music ==
- "Toot", a song by Brant Bjork from the 1999 album Jalamanta

== Other uses ==
- Slang term for cocaine
- Term for passing flatulence
- Term to play a horn instrument or sound a vehicle horn
- Term for posts on the social network Mastodon

== See also ==
- Toon (disambiguation)
- Toos (disambiguation)
- Toot Hill (disambiguation)
- Toot Toot (disambiguation)
- Tooting (disambiguation)
- Toots (disambiguation)
- Tootsie (disambiguation)
