= ToS2 =

ToS2 is an abbreviation that may refer to:

- Tales of Symphonia: Dawn of the New World, a role-playing game released in 2008
- Town of Salem 2, a social deduction game released in 2023

== See also ==
- TOS (disambiguation)
