= Tô =

Tô or To is a Vietnamese surname. It was formerly written in chữ Hán as 蘇.

It derived from the Chinese surname Su, but is written as 苏 in modern simplified characters.

== List of persons with the surname ==
- Tô Hiến Thành, an official in the royal court of the Lý dynasty
- Tô Trung Từ, a high-ranking general and attempted usurper of the Lý dynasty
- Tô Ngọc Vân, painter
- Tô Vĩnh Diện, Viet Minh during the First Indochina War between France and Vietnam
- Tô Lâm, Vietnam's current paramount leader (2024-) and Vietnamese police officer (1974–2024).

== See also ==
- Tó, Portuguese nickname
- To (surname), other surnames Anglicized as "To"
- To (disambiguation)
