= Tono =

Tono, Tōno or Toño may refer to:

== Places ==
- Tōnō, the southeastern portion of Gifu Prefecture, Japan
- Tōno, Iwate, a city in Iwate Prefecture, Japan
- Tono, Washington, a ghost town in the state of Washington, United States
- Tono Dam (Ghana), agricultural dams in Ghana
- Tono River, a river in Oecussi, East Timor
- Tōno Station, a Kamaishi Line railway station in Tōno, Iwate, Japan
- Pasar Tono, a town in Oecussi-Ambeno, East Timor

== People ==
- Tono (name)

== Literature ==
- Tono-Bungay, a 1909 novel by H.G. Wells
- Tōno Monogatari, a collection of folk tales from the Tōno, Iwate, Japan area, collected by Kunio Yanagita

== Other uses ==
- Tono, a Japanese honorific, see Japanese honorifics#Dono / tono
- Tonos, an accent mark used in the Greek alphabet
- Tono humano, one of the main genres of 17th Century Spanish and Portuguese music
- TONO, a Norwegian corporation that administers copyrights for music in Norway
- Recto tono, Latin phrase related to church liturgy and music
- Tono to Issho, Japanese manga

== See also ==
- Ton (disambiguation)
- Toon (disambiguation)
- Toono (disambiguation)
