= Toy (given name) =

As a given name, Toy may refer to:

- Ah Toy (c. 1828–1928), Chinese-born American prostitute and madam
- Toy Bolton, American 1960s NASCAR driver and team owner
- Toy Caldwell (1947–1993), American lead guitarist
- Toy Dorgan (born 1946), American speed skater
- Toy Ledbetter (1927-1995), American football player
- Toy D. Savage Jr. (1921-2017), American politician

== See also ==
- Toy (disambiguation)
- Toy (surname)
- Tó, nicknames
- Ton (given name)
