= Tó =

Tó is a Portuguese nickname. People with this nickname include the following:

- Tó (Mozambican footballer), nickname for Helton Samo Cunha (born 1980), Mozambican footballer
- Tó Barbosa, nickname for António João Ferradeira Santos (born 1992), Portuguese footballer
- Tó Cruz (born António José Ramos da Cruz, 1967), Portuguese singer
- Tó Ferreira, nickname for José António Alves Ferreira (born 1971), Portuguese footballer
- Zé Tó, nickname for José Ántónio Ramos Ribeiro (born 1977), Portuguese footballer

== See also ==
- To (disambiguation)
- Tó Neinilii, rain god of the Navajo
- To (surname), Chinese/Japanese surname
- Tô, Vietnamese surname
- Tod (given name)
- Toi (disambiguation)
- Tom (given name)
- Ton (given name)
- Tor (given name)
- Toy (given name)
- Ty (given name)
