= Ton (given name) =

Ton is a Dutch masculine given name, short for Anton or Antonius. People with the name include:

- Ton Alberts (1927–1999), Dutch architect
- Ton Alblas (1940–2015), Dutch politician
- Ton Alcover (born 1990), Spanish footballer
- Ton Anbeek (born 1944), Dutch author and literary critic
- Ton Blanker (born 1960), Dutch footballer
- Ton Berns (born 1946), Dutch molecular geneticist
- Ton Bisseling (born 1952), Dutch molecular biologist
- Ton Boot (born 1940), Dutch basketball player and coach
- Ton Butter (1920–1999), Dutch economist
- Ton Buunk (born 1952), Dutch water polo player
- Ton Caanen (born 1966), Dutch football manager
- Ton du Chatinier (born 1958), Dutch footballer
- Ton Cornelissen (born 1974), Dutch footballer
- Ton van Duinhoven (1921–2010), Dutch cabaretier, actor and screenwriter
- Ton Elias (born 1955), Dutch VVD politician
- Ton van Engelen (born 1950), Dutch footballer
- Ton Hartsuiker (1933–2015), Dutch classical pianist
- Ton van Heugten (1945–2008), Dutch sidecarcross rider
- Ton Kalle (born 1955), Dutch sculptor
- Ton van Kesteren (born 1954), Dutch VVD politician
- Ton van Klooster (born 1954), Dutch swimmer and swimming coach
- Ton Koopman (born 1944), Dutch conductor, organist and harpsichordist
- Ton Kotter (1906–1991), Dutch composer and conductor
- Ton de Leeuw (1926–1996), Dutch composer
- Ton de Leeuw (born 1941), Dutch organizational theorist
- Ton Lensink (1922–1997), Dutch actor, TV director and writer
- Ton Lokhoff (born 1959), Dutch football player and manager
- Ton van Loon (born 1956), Dutch army commander
- Ton Lutz (1919–2009), Dutch actor and artistic leader
- Ton Masseurs (born 1947), Dutch guitarist
- Ton Meijer, born Dutch chief executive
- Ton van Os (born 1941), Dutch painter and sculptor
- Ton van Osch (born 1955), Dutch army commander
- Ton Pattinama (born 1956), Dutch footballer
- Ton Pronk (1941–2016), Dutch footballer
- Ton Richter (1919–2009), Dutch field hockey player
- Ton Roosendaal (born 1960), Dutch software developer and film producer
- Ton Satomi (1888–1983), pen-name of Japanese author Hideo Yamanouchi
- Ton Scherpenzeel (born 1952), Dutch keyboardist
- Ton Schmidt (born 1948), Dutch water polo player
- Ton Schulten (1938–2025), Dutch landscape painter
- Ton Sijbrands (born 1949), Dutch draughts player
- Ton Strien (born 1958), Dutch CDA politician
- Ton Thie (1944–2021), Dutch football goalkeeper
- Ton Ven (1884–1965), pseudonym of Ferdinand Bordewijk, Dutch author
- Ton van de Ven (1944–2015), Dutch industrial designer
- Ton van den Hurk (1933–2021), Dutch footballer
- Ton Vorst (born 1952), Dutch financial engineer and mathematician
- Ton Vrolijk (born 1958), Dutch track cyclist

== See also ==
- Ton (disambiguation)
- Ton (surname)
- Thon (name)
- Tó, nicknames
- Tod (given name)
- Toi (name)
- Tom (given name)
- Tona (name)
- Toni
- Tono (name)
- Tony (name)
- Tõnu
- Toon (name)
- Tor (given name)
- Toy (given name)
