= Terms of Service (disambiguation) =

Terms of service are the legal agreements between a service provider and a person who wants to use that service.

Terms of service may also refer to:

- Terms of Service; Didn't Read (ToS:DR), a community project to evaluate various terms of services
- "Terms of Service" (Legends of Tomorrow), a 2019 episode of the TV series Legends of Tomorrow

== See also ==
- Term of enlistment in military service (term of service)
- End user license agreement (EULA)
- License agreement
- Service (disambiguation)
- Term (disambiguation)
- TOS (disambiguation)
