= Toy (disambiguation) =

A toy is an object used in play.

Toy, TOY or Toys may also refer to:

== People ==
- Toy (surname), a list of people with the surname
- Toy (given name), a list of people with the given name
- Dorothy Toy, stage name of Japanese-American dancer Shigeko Takahashi (1917–2019)
- Toy (footballer, born 1977), Cape Verdean-Portuguese footballer

== Film ==
- ToY (film), a 2015 erotic lesbian romance drama
- Toys (film), a 1992 film starring Robin Williams
- The Toy (1976 film), a French comedy
- The Toy (1982 film), starring Richard Pryor

== Music ==
=== Groups ===
- Toy (English band), an English rock band
- Toy (Norwegian band), an electronic duo
- Toy (South Korean band), a South Korean music group
- Toy (German band), a German electronic band
- The Toys, an American pop girl group
- The Toys, former name of Berlin (band)

=== Albums ===
- Toy (Toy album), the debut album by Toy, 2012
- Toy (EP), by Faye Wong, 1997
- Toy (David Bowie album), an album by David Bowie, 2021
- Toy (Yello album), 2016
- Toy (A Giant Dog album), 2017
- Toys (Funkadelic album), 2008
- Toys (Uri Caine album), 1995

=== Songs ===
- "Toy" (song), a song by Netta Barzilai, representing Israel, which won the 2018 Eurovision Song Contest
- "Toy", a song by f(x) from the album Pink Tape
- "Toy", a song by Young Fathers from the album Cocoa Sugar
- "Toys", a song by Spandau Ballet from Journeys to Glory

== Other uses ==
- Toy, Iran, a village in North Khorasan Province
- The Toy (play), a 1789 play by John O'Keeffe
- To-y, a 1985 manga/anime series
- Toys (video game), a 1993 Super NES and Sega Genesis action video game based on the film
- Toy (chewing gum), a chewing gum sold in Sweden
- Toy (graffiti)
- Toy dog
- Toy problem, a problem used as an example for demonstrating or testing problem solving methods in mathematics and related fields
- Toys (novel), a novel by James Patterson and Neil McMahon
- Toyama Airport, Japan, IATA airport code
- Toys Hill, a hamlet and hill in Kent, England

== See also ==
- Plaything (disambiguation)
- Khilona (disambiguation) (lit. 'Toy' in Hindi)
