= Tool (disambiguation) =

A tool is a device that is required or helpful for the performance of an operation.

Tool may also refer to:

- Magical tools in Wicca, a set of tools used in Wiccan practices
- Tool (band), an American metal band
- Tool, Texas, a US city
- TOOL, the proprietary programming language used by Forte 4GL
- Tool, a derogatory term
- Programming tool, or software development tool, a computer program used to create, debug, maintain, or otherwise support other programs and applications
- Tool around, to aimlessly browse, drive, ride, or walk around with no particular goal, just for the pleasure of it
- Tool steel, a hard and durable type of steel used to make tools
- "Tool", a song by Baboon from Face Down in Turpentine

== See also ==
- Toolz, the Nigerian radio personality Tolu Oniru
- Toon (disambiguation)
- Toos (disambiguation)
- Tulle (netting), a light-weight netting or fabric often used in wedding gowns and ballet tutus
