= Toi =

Toi or TOI may refer to:

== Places ==
- Toi Market, in Nairobi, Kenya
- Toi, Niue, a village in Niue
- Toi, Shizuoka (土肥町 Toi-chō), Japan
- Toi Toi, a suburb of Nelson, New Zealand

== People and characters ==
- Toi (Bible), a Biblical figure
- Toi (given name), a list of notable people
- Toi (surname), a list of notable people
- Toi-te-huatahi, an early Māori explorer

== Media and entertainment ==
=== Music ===
- Toi (band), a group of electronic folk rock musicians in the Philippines
- Toi music, a genre of folk music from Central Asia
- "Toi" (song), a French-language song, 1975 Eurovision entry for Luxembourg sung by Geraldine
- "Toi", single by Hélène Rollès from the album Toi... Émois
- Ms. Toi, an American rapper

=== Other media ===
- Toi, a contestant in Akademi Fantasia, Season 6, in Malaysia
- Toi8 (born 1976), a Japanese artist
- The Times of India, an Indian English-language daily newspaper
- The Times of Israel, an Israeli multi-language online newspaper
- You (2007 film), known in French as Toi, a 2007 Canadian film

== Science and technology ==
- Toi, a cultivar of karuka (Pandanus julianettii)
- Third-order intercept point, a specification of electronic amplifiers
- Transdermal optical imaging
- Transiting Exoplanet Survey Satellite (TESS) Object of Interest

== Other uses ==
- Toi, a group of pirates responsible for the Toi invasion of Japan in 1019
- Toi toi toi, an expression used to wish an artist success
- Theatre on ice, a branch of figure skating
- Time on ice, an ice hockey statistic
- Tonga language (Zambia and Zimbabwe), whose ISO 639-3 code is toi

== See also ==
- Ton (disambiguation)
