= Ton (surname) =

Ton is a surname. Notable people with this surname.

- Andreas Ton (born 1962), Italian-born Swiss ice hockey player
- John Ton (1826–1896), Dutch-born American abolitionist
- Petr Ton (born 1973), Czech ice hockey player
- Quinty Ton (born 1998), Dutch cyclist
- Svatoslav Ton (born 1978), Czech high jumper
- Tommy Ton (born 1984), Canadian fashion photographer

== See also ==
- Ton (disambiguation)
- Ton (given name)
- Tôn, Vietnamese surname
- Toon (name)
