= To (surname) =

East Asian family name

To, Tô, and Tō are a group of surnames of East Asian origin, for each of which "To" (without any diacritical mark) is at least an occasional variant.

Tô is a Vietnamese surname (Chữ Nôm: 蘇) derived from the Chinese surname Su.

From Chinese 陶 (Tao):

- Tô, the Minnan romanization of the name
- To, the Cantonese romanization for the name
- Tō, the romanization of the Japanese surname 陶, which is derived from the (same Chinese) name

== Individuals named To ==
- Johnnie To (杜), a Hong Kong film director and producer
- Kenneth King Him To, an Australian and Hong Kong swimmer
- Marcus To, a Canadian comics artist
- Tô Hiến Thành, a famous governmental officer in the past of Vietnam

== See also ==
- To (disambiguation)
- Tó, Portuguese nickname
- Tô, Vietnamese surname
