= Toom (surname) =

Family name

Origin
- Language: Estonian
- Region of origin: Estonia

Other names
- Variant form: Toome

Toom is a common surname in Estonia. Notable people with the surname include:

- Alo Toom (born 1986), Estonian wrestler
- Andrei Toom (1942–2022), Russian mathematician
- Artur Toom (1884–1942), Estonian ornithologist and conservationist
- Hugo Toom (born 2002), Estonian basketball player
- Johannes Toom (1896–1972), Estonian weightlifter
- Merily Toom (born 1994), Estonian footballer
- Taavi Toom (born 1970), Estonian diplomat
- Tanel Toom (born 1982), Estonian director and screenwriter
- Yana Toom (born 1966), Estonian politician
- Kardo Toom (born 1998), Estonian Hip-Hop artist from Parnu

== See also ==
- Toom (disambiguation)
- Toon (name)
- Toome (surname)
- Tohme (surname)
