= T/O =

T/O might mean one of the following:

- Takeoff
- Table of Organization and Equipment
- Takeout double

== See also ==
- TO (disambiguation)
