= Toon (name) =

Toon is a Dutch masculine given name, often a diminutive form (hypocorism) of Antonius or Antonie. Notable people with the name include the following:

== Given name ==
- Toon Aerts (born 1993), Belgian cyclist
- Toon de Ruiter (1935–2001), Dutch rower
- Toon Greebe (born 1988), Dutch darts player
- Toon Hiranyasap (born 1954), Thai film actor
- Toon Lenaerts (born 1990), Belgian footballer
- Toon Meerman (1933–2023), retired Dutch footballer
- Toon van Driel (born 1945), Dutch cartoonist
- Toon van Welsenes (1903–1974), Dutch athlete

== Hypocorism ==
- Toon Becx, Antonius Wilhelmus Maria Becx (1920−2013), Dutch footballer
- Toon Dupuis, Antonius Stanislaus Nicolaas Ludovicus Dupuis, (1877–1937), Dutch sculptor and medallist of Belgian origin
- Toon or Anton Ebben, Antonius Ebben (1930–2011), Dutch equestrian
- Toon Geurts, Antonius Geurts (1932–2017), Dutch canoer
- Toon Hermans, Antoine Gerard Theodore Hermans (1916–2000), Dutch comedian, singer and writer
- Toon Oprinsen, Antonius Adrianus Henricus Oprinsen (1910–1945), Dutch football midfielder
- Toon Pastor, Antonius Franciscus Pastor (1929–2008), Dutch boxer
- Toon Tellegen, Antonius Otto Hermannus Tellegen (born 1941), Dutch writer, poet, and physician, known for his children's works
- Toon Verhoef, Anthonie Wilhelmus Verhoef (born 1946), Dutch artist
- Toon van Helfteren, Anton van Helfteren (born 1951), Dutch basketball player and coach

== Surname ==
- Al Toon (born 1963), American football player
- Colin Toon (born 1940), English footballer
- Francine Toon (born 1986), British writer
- James Toon (cricketer) (1916–1987), English cricketer
- James Toon (American football) (1938 – 2011), American gridiron football player and coach
- Joseph Toon (1879–1950), English cricketer
- Malcolm Toon (1916–2009), American diplomat
- Maurice Toon, New Zealand paralympic boccia player
- Michael Toon (born 1979), Australian rowing coxswain
- Michael Simon Toon (born 1977), English filmmaker and builder
- Nick Toon (born 1988), American football wide receiver
- Owen Toon (born 1947), American professor of atmospheric and oceanic sciences
- Paige Toon (born 1975), English romantic fiction writer
- Peter Toon (1939–2009), English Anglican priest
- Thomas F. Toon (1840–1902), Confederate States Army brigadier general

== See also ==
- Toon (disambiguation)
- Thon (name)
- Ton (given name)
- Ton (surname)
- Tono (name)
- Took, surname
- Toom (surname)
- Toos (given name)
