= Toot Toot =

Toot Toot may refer to:

- Toot Toot!, 1998 album by Australian band The Wiggles
- "Toot Toot" (The Mighty B!), an episode of The Mighty B
- Toot-Toot (The Dresden Files), a character from The Dresden Files
- Toot Toot, a musical by Henry W. Savage

== See also ==
- Toot (disambiguation)
- My Toot-Toot, a song by Rockin' Sidney
- My Toot Toot (album), an album by Jean Knight
