= Toom =

Toom may refer to:

- Toom (surname)
- Toom (Netherlands), a hamlet
- Toom (supermarket), a chain of supermarkets in Germany; see Minimal (supermarket)
- Toum, a garlic sauce from Lebanon (alternative spelling)
- Time Out of Mind (Bob Dylan album), 1997
