= Toes (disambiguation) =

Toes are the digits of the foot of a human or animal.

Toes or TOES may also refer to:

- "Toes" (Zac Brown Band song), 2009
- "Toes" (Lights song), 2011
- "Toes" (DaBaby song), 2019
- "Toes", a song by Glass Animals from the 2014 album Zaba.
- The Other Economic Summit, a counter-summit to the annual G7 summits

== See also ==
- Toe (disambiguation)
- Toos (disambiguation)
- Tows
