= Plaything =

Plaything or Playthings may refer to:

- Toy or plaything, an object used to provide entertainment

== Music ==
- Playthings, a band featuring New Zealand musician and music producer Paul Kean on bass
- "Plaything" (song), a song by American singer Rebbie Jackson

== Television ==
- "Playthings", an episode of the television show Supernatural
- "Plaything" (Black Mirror), an episode of the television show Black Mirror

== Films ==
- Playthings (film), a 1918 American silent film
- Playthings (1933 film), a 1933 Chinese film also known as Little Toys

== Other uses ==
- Playthings (magazine), (1903–2010) an industry magazine based in New York City focusing on toys and games

== See also ==
- Toy (disambiguation)
- Khilona (disambiguation) (lit. 'Plaything' in Hindi)
