= Tons =

Tons may refer to:

- Tons River, a significant river in India
- Tonsley line (timetable code: TONS), Adelaide, Australia
- Tamsa River, locally known as Tons in its lower parts (Allahabad district, Uttar Pradesh, India)
- The plural of ton, a unit of mass, force, volume, energy, or power, which includes:
  - Short ton, equivalent to 2,000 pounds, primarily used in the United States
  - Long ton, equivalent to 2,240 pounds, primarily used in countries such as the United Kingdom which utilize the imperial system
  - Metric ton, also known as a tonne, equivalent to 1,000 kilograms or 2,204.6 pounds
- Tons (band), an American rock band

== See also ==
- Ton (disambiguation)
