= Toss =

Toss, Tossed or Tossing may refer to:

== Places in the canton of Zürich, Switzerland ==
- Töss, a district of the city of Winterthur
  - Winterthur Töss railway station
- Töss Monastery
- Töss (river)
- Töss Valley
  - Töss Valley Railway

== Film ==
- Toss (2007 film), an Indian Telugu film
- Toss (2009 film), an Indian Hindi film
- Toss (2017 film), and Indian Kannada film

== Sports and games ==
- Toss (cricket), a coin flip to determine which team bats first
- Toss, a method of determining the order of play in the table game of Carrom
- Sheaf toss, a traditional Scottish agricultural sport
- The first part of a tennis serve

== Other ==
- Toss Woollaston (1910-1998), New Zealand painter
- Type one secretion system, in biochemistry
- TOSS (operating system), the Tri-Lab Operating System Stack, a Linux distribution
- "Tossed", a song by Frank Black on his Frank Black (album)
- Toss pillow, another name for a throw pillow
- Vulgar UK slang for masturbation
- Toss, a character in the Cut the Rope series

== See also ==
- Full toss, cricket delivery
- TOS (disambiguation)
- Toss juggling
- Toss bombing, a type of military aerial bombing
- The Tossers, a Celtic punk band from Chicago, Illinois
