= Tohme (surname) =

Tohme or Tohmé is an Arabic surname. Notable people with the surname include:

- Bassam Tohme (born 1969), Syrian politician
- Christine Tohmé (born 1964), Lebanese curator
- Tarek Tohme, American filmmaker

== See also ==
- Toome (surname)
- Toom (surname)
