= Khel =

Khel may refer to:

- Khel (clan), a Pashtun tribal divisioning system
- KHEL-LP, a radio station licensed to serve Rogers, Arkansas, United States
- Khel (1950 film), an Indian Hindi-language film
- Khel (1992 film), an Indian Hindi-language romantic comedy film by Rakesh Roshan, starring Madhuri Dixit and Anil Kapoor
- Khel – No Ordinary Game, a 2003 Indian Hindi-language action film by Yusuf Khan, starring Sunny Deol, Sunil Shetty and Celina Jaitley

== See also ==
- Khilona (disambiguation)
- "Ab Khel Ke Dikha", 2016 Pakistan Super League anthem by Ali Zafar
- "Ab Khel Jamay Ga", 2017 Pakistan Super League anthem by Ali Zafar
