= Toome (surname) =

Family name

Origin
- Language: Estonian
- Region of origin: Estonia

Other names
- Variant form: Toom

Toome is a surname in Estonia, and may refer to:

- Indrek Toome (1943–2023), Soviet Estonian politician
- Joosep Toome (born 1985), Estonian basketball player
- Koit Toome (born 1979), Estonian singer
- Mart Toome (born 1980), Estonian actor

== See also ==
- Toom (surname)
- Tohme (surname)
