= Khilona =

Khilona or Khilauna (lit. 'Toy' or 'Plaything') may refer to:

- Khilona (1942 film), an Indian Hindi-language film by Sarvottam Badami, starring Snehprabha and P. Jairaj
- Khilona (1970 film), an Indian Hindi-language romantic drama film by Chander Vohra, starring Rajesh Khanna and Mumtaz
- "Khilona", the fifth episode of the first season of the 2022 Indian romantic TV drama Hasratein
- "Khilona", an episode of the Indian true crime TV series Crime Alert

== See also ==
- Khel (disambiguation) (lit. 'play' or 'game' in Hindi)
- Toy (disambiguation)
- Plaything (disambiguation)
- Khilona Bana Khalnayak (lit. 'Toy Becomes Villain'), Hindi title for Zapatlela (lit. 'Haunted'), a 1993 Indian Marathi-language horror film; first in the Zapatlela film series
