= Toono =

Toono may refer to:

- Toono, Yurt element
- Tōno, Iwate, city in Iwate Prefecture, Japan
- Eijirō Tōno, Japanese actor

== Fictional characters ==
- Ami Toono, character from manga Doubt
- Kazuki Toono, see List of Ultimate Otaku Teacher characters
- Kyou Toono, from Chibi Devi!
- Mizuki Toono, from Detective Conan: Quarter of Silence
- Reiko Toono, from Hi Score Girl

== See also ==
- Tono (disambiguation)
