= Toots (nickname) =

Toots is a nickname of:

- Toots Barger (1913–1998), American duckpin bowler
- Salvador Camarata (1913–2005), American composer, arranger, trumpeter and record producer
- Toots Ferrell (1929–2002), American Negro league pitcher
- Toots Hibbert (1945–2020), Jamaican ska and reggae musician, founder of Toots and the Maytals
- Albert Holway (1902–1968), Canadian National Hockey League player
- Denis Kelleher (1931–2002), Irish former Gaelic footballer
- Irving Meretsky (1912–2006), Canadian basketball player, on the 1936 Olympic silver medal team
- Toots Mondello (1911–1992), American swing jazz alto saxophonist
- Toots Mondt (1894–1976), American wrestling promoter
- Susan Ople (born 1962), Filipino politician
- Tommy Sampson (baseball) (1912–2002), American Negro league baseball player
- Toots Shor (1903–1977), American restaurateur
- Toots Shultz (1888–1959), American Major League Baseball pitcher
- Toots Thielemans (1922–2016), Belgian jazz musician
- Les Tietje (1910–1996), American Major League Baseball pitcher
- Toots Zynsky (born 1951), American glass artist
