= TOS =

TOS, tos, ToS, or TOs commonly refers to:

- Terms of service, the legal agreements between service providers and the service consumers

TOS, tos, ToS, or TOs may also refer to:

== Chemistry ==
- Tosyl, a chemical group
- Gy's sampling theory (abbreviation)

== Entertainment ==
- Star Trek: The Original Series, a name retroactively applied to the 1960s science fiction TV series originally known as Star Trek
- Temple of Shadows, 2004 album by Angra
- T·O·S (Terminate on Sight), 2008 album by G-Unit
- Town of Salem, a social deduction game published by BlankMediaGames in 2014
- Tree of Savior, a multiplayer online role playing game published by IMC Games in 2016

== Medicine ==
- Thoracic outlet syndrome, a medical condition
- Toxic oil syndrome, caused by consuming non-food grade oil

== Organizations ==
- The Oceanography Society
- Theosophical Order of Service, an international organization
- Temple of Set, an occult society
- Tennessee Ornithological Society
- Trucial Oman Scouts, UK force raised in Oman in 1951
- Television Oita System, a television station in Oita Prefecture, Japan

== Other uses ==
- TOS-1, a Soviet thermobaric weapon
- Atari TOS, or The Operating System, the operating system of the Atari ST range of computers
- TOS/360, or Tape Operating System/360
- Tam o' shanter (cap), a traditional Scottish bonnet
- Terminal Operating System, controlling cargo movement
- Testament of Solomon, a pseudepigraphical composite text ascribed to King Solomon
- Type of service, a field in the header of IPv4 packets
- Highland Totonac language (ISO 639-3 code: iso)
- Tromsø Airport, Norway (IATA code: ISO)

== See also ==
- Toos (disambiguation)
- Toss (disambiguation)
