= Toots Shor's Restaurant =

- Interactive map of Toots Shor's Restaurant

Restaurant information
- Established: 1940
- Closed: 1971
- Location: 51 West 51st Street, New York, New York, 10019, United States
- Coordinates: 40°45′39″N 73°58′49.6″W

Toots Shor's Restaurant was a restaurant and lounge owned and operated by Bernard "Toots" Shor at 51 West 51st Street in Manhattan during the 1940s and 1950s. It was known for its oversized circular bar. It was frequented by celebrities, and together with the 21 Club, the Stork Club, Delmonico's and El Morocco was one of the places to see and be seen. Joe DiMaggio often went there to dine, and that helped make it famous. Toots was said to do personal favors for Joe as well, at no cost.

Jackie Gleason always ate there for free. Other notable guests included Frank Sinatra, Judy Garland, Marilyn Monroe, Orson Welles, Yogi Berra, and Ernest Hemingway (Berra and Hemingway allegedly met there).

== History ==
The restaurant opened April 30, 1940. It cost $100,000 to open, with Shor hustling to find $50,000 and getting Leo Justin, a New Jersey theater owner, to invest the other $50,000, with the assistance of four associates. While the food at Toots Shor's Restaurant was known to be “nuttin’ fancy” — standard American, sports-bar fare such as shrimp cocktail, steak, baked potato — the establishment became well known for who frequented there and how Shor interacted with them. Shor was a raconteur and a master of the "needle," jibes or quips directed at the famous. Within two years, Shor's partners had made their investment back.

The restaurant later expanded into 53 and 55 West 51st Street, doubling the size of the tavern, adding upstairs banquet rooms and a private projection room.

Celebrity alone was not enough to receive first-class service in Shor's restaurant. According to David Halberstam in his book The Summer of '49, guests had to observe the unwritten "code" which prevailed in Shor's establishment. Charlie Chaplin, who was not privy to that code, was made to wait in line. When Chaplin complained, Shor told him to entertain the others who were waiting in line. One day, MGM head Louis B. Mayer complained about waiting twenty minutes for a table and said, “I trust the food will be worth all that waiting.” Shor replied: “It’ll be better’n some of your crummy pictures I stood in line for.”

In a famous incident, Shor outdrank Jackie Gleason and left him on the floor to prove the point. Somewhat notoriously, wives were not welcome in Toots's saloon; it was known, in the argot of the day, as a place of "booze and broads," where ballplayers, actors and politicians mixed. Baseball players were especially welcomed; in particular, Shor admired Mickey Mantle. He also adored Joe DiMaggio. Shor always ensured that DiMaggio got first-rate service without being hassled or asked for autographs by restaurant staff, other patrons, or fans. Another prominent figure who frequented Shor's restaurant was famed trial attorney Edward Bennett Williams. During his time as a private attorney while living in New York City in the mid-1960s, Richard Nixon liked to stop in on Saturday nights, usually to talk sports with the various athletes who were present.

Toots Shor cultivated his celebrity following by giving them unqualified admiration, loyal friendship, and a kind of happy, boozy, old-fashioned male privacy. Those whom Shor really liked were called “crum-bums”. Shor reputedly said that he didn't care if he was a millionaire—so long as he could live like one. Shor was rewarded after a fashion with a mention in the 1954 film White Christmas, in which Bing Crosby's character comments to Rosemary Clooney's, while both are raiding the restaurant refrigerator of the Vermont inn where they are staying, that the food is not as fancy as Toots Shor's.

In September 1958, Shor sold the lease for his 51st Street restaurant for $1.5 million to William Zeckendorf and Mutual Life and it closed on June 30, 1959.

The following year he opened at a new location at 33 West 52nd Street, the former Leon & Eddie's, and tried to emulate the decor and atmosphere of the original. The then-Chief Justice Earl Warren considered Toots one of his closest friends, and "The Chief" showed up to be photographed with a shovel full of dirt when Toots broke ground on his 52nd street "joint."

== Closing ==
In 1971, authorities padlocked the doors of the 52nd Street restaurant for nonpayment of federal, state, and local taxes totaling $269,516. Shor vowed to open again in three weeks, but 18 months passed before his restaurant at 5 East 54th Street opened. For a variety of reasons, however, his famous clientele never returned with their former regularity. In 1977, the 52nd Street restaurant became a disco called "New York New York." "Toots" Shor died indigent in 1977.
