= Prosper Ego =

Dutch politician (1927–2015)

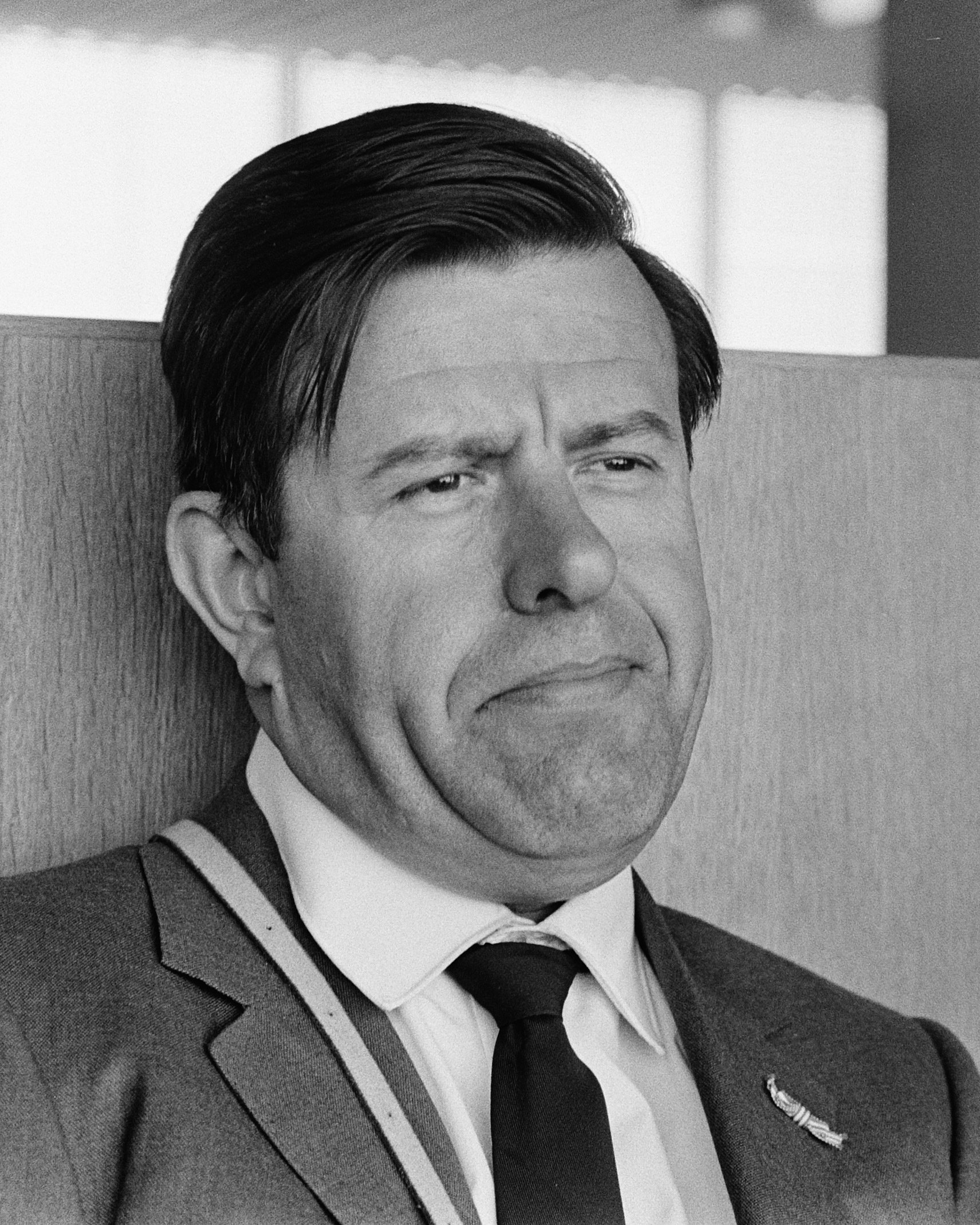
Prosper Ego in 1970

Prosper Joannes Gerardus Antonius Ego (17 July 1927 – 23 January 2015) was a Dutch politician and founder of the veterans' organization the Oud-Strijders Legioen ("Former Warriors Legion").

== Biography ==
Prosper Joannes Gerardus Antonius Ego was born on 17 July 1927 into a Roman Catholic family in The Hague. At the age of 17, during the Nazi German occupation of the Netherlands, he was arrested and deported to Germany as a forced labourer. On his return he worked in the administration of the Red Cross. Ego was sent as a conscript to the Dutch East Indies (now Indonesia) in 1947 where he was stationed in the Dutch army garrison at Makassar, Sulawesi as a hygienist.

On Ego's return to the Netherlands in 1950 he worked for some time at the Red Cross, and afterwards as an insurance agent. He was active in the Catholic National Party (Katholiek Nationale Partij, KNP) and participated in the founding of the Veteranen Legioen Nederland (Veteran’s League of the Netherlands).

At the end of 1955, partly under pressure from the Catholic Church, the KNP was absorbed by the Catholic People's Party. Some KNP members, particularly in the Hague, opposed this, and in early 1956 the National Unity (Nationale Unie, NU) party was formed. Ego stood as a candidate for the NU in the parliamentary elections of that year, but failed to get elected. After the Hungarian uprising in 1956 conflicts arose within the Veteranen Legioen Nederland. Partly because of these conflicts, Ego set up the Oud-Strijders Legioen for those who served in the Korean War in 1958, and became its chairman. He was the Nationale Unie’s candidate for the Hague in municipal elections in 1958, but was not elected. In 1960 some members of the Nationale Unie left and joined the newly formed Liberale Staatspartij (Liberal Party). Ego became vice-chairman, and stood as a candidate in the parliamentary elections of 1963, but the party failed to win a single seat.

Ego supported apartheid in South Africa, and was one of the founders of the Stichting Nederlands Zuid-Afrikaanse Werkgemeenschap (Netherlands-South Africa Friendship Association). He was also involved with the Stichting Nederland-Verenigde Staten van Amerika (Netherlands-USA Association).

During the 1970s the OSL was opened to non-veterans. Ego used the OSL’s magazine Sta Vast to publish pro-Nato and pro-American articles. The OSL flew airplanes over peace demonstrations with banners carrying the slogans “Rather a rocket in the garden than a Russian in the kitchen” and “Stop the SS20 rocket”.

In 1995 Ego was fined 5000 guilders (2270 euros) after being found guilty of inciting xenophobia. The charges related to articles published in Sta Vast in 1992, in which ethnic minorities were called "profiteers" and "criminals". Although the articles were not written by Ego, as editor he was held responsible for their publication.

In an interview in 2004 Ego stated that since the conviction articles were carefully scrutinised before being sent to the printer.

In the September 2009 issue of Sta Vast Ego announced his intention to quit as president and chief. It was also announced that the Sta-Vast van de Stichtingen voor Vrijheid en Veiligheid would be wound up. The two main reasons were Ego's age (82) and the decline in readership, which had fallen from a high of 14,000 in the 1980s to 2,500.

In 2010 the Oud-Strijders Legioen closed. Some OSL board members started a website, OSL-Actueel (OSL-News). Ego wrote for this website. He died in Breda in 2015.
