= Tô Vĩnh Diện =

Tô Vĩnh Diện (1924 – 1 February 1954) was a soldier in the Việt Minh during the First Indochina War against France in Vietnam. Dien was proclaimed a national hero by the Việt Minh after his death in the period leading up to the Battle of Dien Bien Phu.

Before the battle, General Võ Nguyên Giáp, commanding the Việt Minh, needed to move large numbers of artillery through the jungle from the roads and tracks on which they had arrived into specially dug casements in the hillsides overlooking the French positions in the Dien Bien Phu valley. In process that took an average of seven nights per artillery piece, the Viet Minh used ropes, levers and pulley systems to manoeuvre weapons as heavy as two tons, in the case of the 105 mm guns, through the jungle in wet weather conditions where the guns were liable to slip.

Tô Vĩnh Diện was a soldier in the Việt Minh who took part in the effort to move the artillery into firing positions, together with what may have been up to 30,000 other porters. To Vinh Dien was proclaimed as a national hero by the Việt Minh when, in early 1954, as an artillery pieces began to slip down slope he placed his own body under the wheel to serve as a wedge.
