= Ton, Burkina Faso =

Ton
- Location within Burkina Faso
- Coordinates: 11°34′N 2°42′W
- Country: Burkina Faso
- Region: Boucle du Mouhoun Region
- Province: Balé Province
- Department: Fara Department

Population (2019)
  - Total: 3,055
- Time zone: UTC+0 (GMT)

Ton is a village in the Fara Department of Balé Province in southern Burkina Faso.

Population
Year	Pop.	±%
2006	2,124	—
2019	3,055	+43.8%
