= Tootsie (nickname) =

Tootsie is an English hypocorism for different names. It may refer to:

- Tootsie Duvall (born Susan Steinweidle), American actress
- Tootsie Guevarra (born Emma Theresa Pinga in 1980), Filipina former recording artist, actress, and television host
- Tootsie Tomanetz (born c. 1934-5), American pitmaster and restaurateur
