= Tooting (disambiguation) =

Tooting is a suburb in the London Borough of Wandsworth.

Tooting may also refer to:

- Tooting (UK Parliament constituency), comprising Tooting, Balham and Earlsfield
- Tooting (crater), a surface feature of the planet Mars
- 8380 Tooting, an asteroid
- Tooting railway station
- Slang term for the act of passing flatus
- Posting on Mastodon, a social networking service
