= Toe (name) =

Toe may refer to the following people:

Given name

- Toe Blake (1912–1995), Canadian ice hockey player and coach
- Toe Naing Mann (born 1978), Burmese businessman
- Toe Nash (born 1982), American baseball player

Surname

- Albert S. Toe (1953–2010), Liberian politician
- Arcadia Martin Wesay Toe (born 1982), Liberian football striker
- Aung Toe, Chief Justice of the Supreme Court of Myanmar
- Khin Maung Toe (1950–2012), Burmese singer and songwriter
- Nay Toe (born 1981), Burmese film actor and comedian
- Shwe Toe (born 1960), Burmese dental scientist
