= Oud-Strijders Legioen =

Dutch right-wing veterans organization

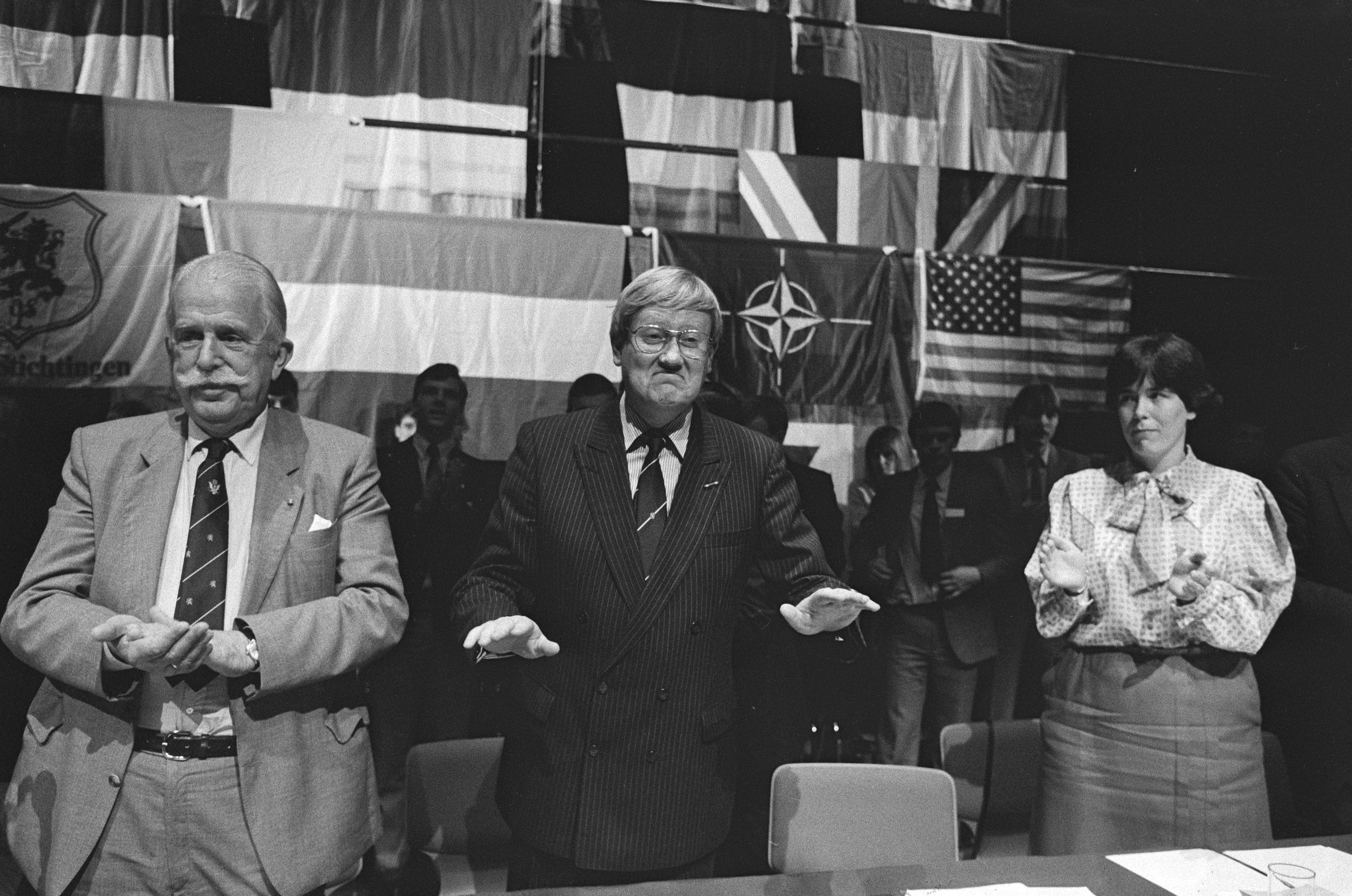
Photograph of the 1985 OSL national congress at Apeldoorn

The Oud-Strijders Legioen (OSL; "Former Warriors' Legion") was a Dutch right-wing veterans' organization that was active after 1958 and which still maintains a web presence. Though never a big organization or a political party, the OSL exerted considerable influence in Dutch politics and was a well-known voice for conservative nationalism, particularly in the 1980s and 1990s. It was led, from the beginning, by military veteran Prosper Ego.

== History ==
The OSL was founded in 1958 by Prosper Ego, who had served in the Netherlands Indies and had been active in the VLN, a veterans organization, since 1952; he and others split off from the VLN when that organization wanted to take up arms following the Hungarian Revolution of 1956. The OSL was composed mainly of former military personnel who saw action in the Indonesian National Revolution and the Korean War. It attracted people who were opposed to communism and the peace and anti-nuclear movement of the 1960s and afterward, and supported the South-African apartheid regime. In its heyday, the foundation had 14,000 supporters. During the large demonstrations of the 1980s against nuclear arms in the Netherlands, the OSL organized prominent counterprotests, flying planes over the demonstrations trailing banners with slogans such as Liever een raket in de tuin dan een Rus in de keuken ("Better a cruise missile in your garden than a Russian in your kitchen"). It published a magazine, Sta-Vast ("Stand firm"); in the 1990s LPF politician Mat Herben was the magazine's editor in chief, and he was fined 5000 guilders in 1995 for printing a bigoted article. The organization was later renamed OSL Stichtingen (or, more fully, "OSL Stichtingen voor vrijheid & veiligheid", meaning "OSL organizations for freedom and security").

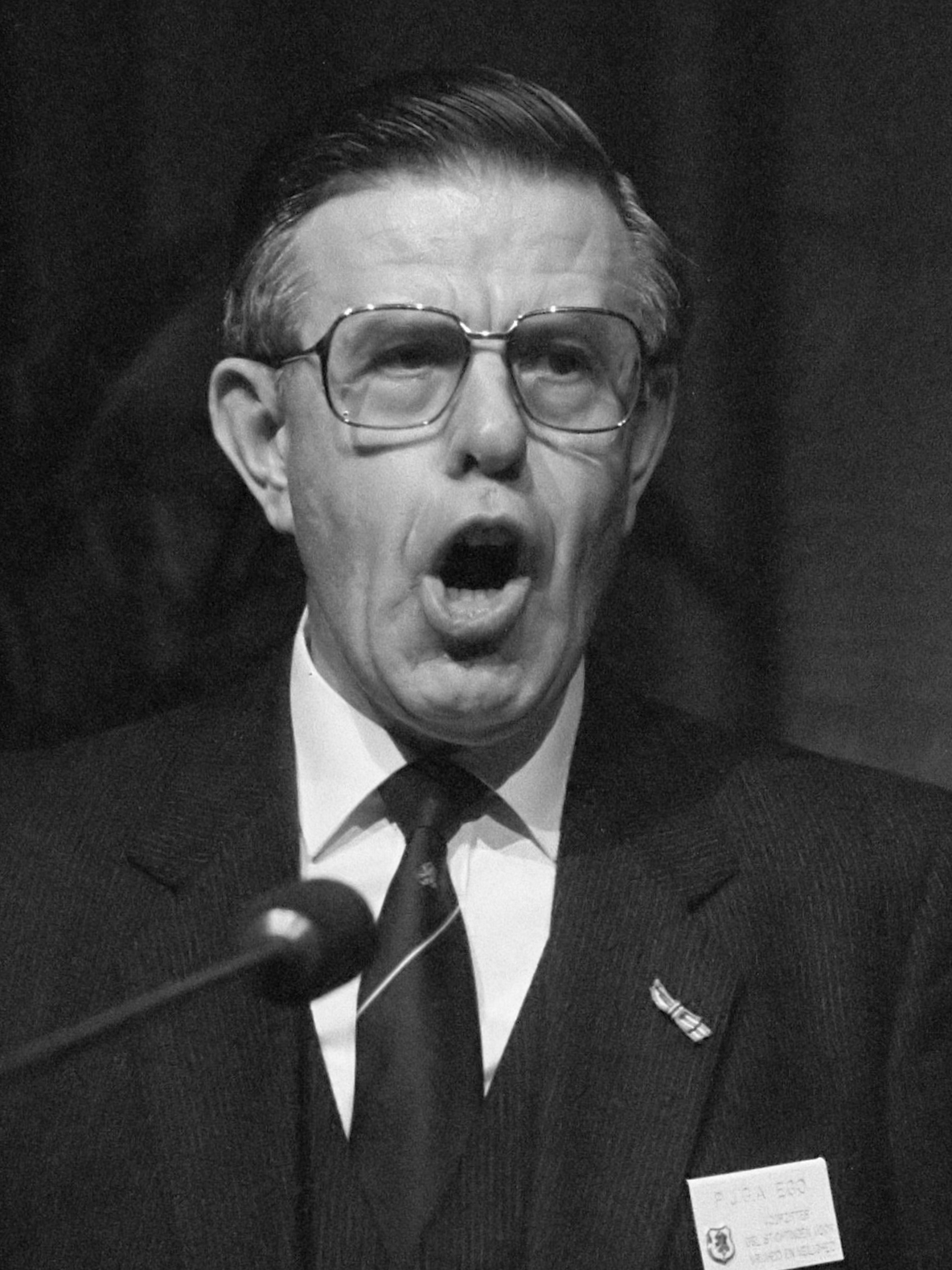
Prosper Ego, 1986

The OSL never intended to be a political party and never received government subsidies (common for political parties in the Netherlands). Its platform includes a desire for a self-sufficient military, protection of the parliamentary democracy, protection of citizens and their properties, and a "powerful" foreign policy within the European Union and NATO. As a conservative nationalist organization, the OSL formed an alternative in the 1980s for those who considered the Centre Party, then the leading right-wing political party, too loud and too extreme. Throughout the 1980s and the 1990s, the OSL was one of the most important critics (with the Reformed Political Party) of "cultural permissiveness". In the 1970s and 1980s, it influenced the right wings of the more mainstream conservative parties Christian Democratic Appeal (CDA) and People's Party for Freedom and Democracy (VVD); in the 1990s it also influenced the LPF, the populist party founded by Pim Fortuyn.

By 2010 Ego, still the OSL's chairman, had begun to scale down the organization, donating the archives documentation to the Nationaal Archief. The organization was dissolved that year and closed its office, in Rotterdam; at the time it had some 2400 members. A few months later, though, Ego announced that with new financial support the organization had restarted its website; writers for the site include Herben and Ego.

== Assessment and criticism ==
Dutch writer Jeroen van Bergeijk compared the OSL to the American Legion—"a kind of Boy Scout organization for the elderly ... a conservative club which aims to combat desecration of the flag, reintroduce prayer in schools, and keep homosexuals out of its ranks". The evaluation of the OSL in a publication by the Anne Frank Foundation in 1981, Oud en nieuw fascisme, caused some controversy: the OSL was designated as "extreme right-wing", with fascist characteristics (racism, neo-colonialism).
