= Toi (surname) =

Toi may refer to the following notable people:

- Đặng Văn Tới (born 1999), Vietnamese footballer
- Deo Nang Toï (1914–2008), Vietnamese royalty
- Jūgatsu Toi (1948–2013), Japanese travel writer and visual producer
- Mutsuo Toi (1917–1938), perpetrator of the Tsuyama massacre
- Roman Toi (1916–2018), Estonian-Canadian composer, choir conductor, and organist
