= Toots (film) =

- Directed by: Kristi Jacobson
- Produced by: Alicia Sams; Whitney Dow
- Cinematography: Daniel B. Gold
- Edited by: Lewis Erskine; Penelope Falk
- Music by: Mark Suozzo
- Distributed by: IndiePix Films
- Release date: 2006
- Running time: 85 minutes
- Country: United States
- Language: English

Toots is a documentary film which outlines the life of Toots Shor (1903–1977), Manhattan's premier saloonkeeper from the year 1940 to the year 1959. At 18, he relocated from South Philadelphia to New York and became a speakeasy bouncer. In 1940, he opened his restaurant, Toots Shor's at 51 West 51st St., which was frequented by sports heroes, actors, mobsters, cops, politicians, visiting dignitaries, and writers. The film is commentated by Shor's daughter, Frank Gifford, Peter Duchin, former sports writers, and others as the filmmaker mixes still photographs, archive footage, including an appearance on "This Is Your Life," and an audio-tape interview from 1975 to present a portrait of New York during and after Prohibition and of a lovable, larger-than-life, uniquely New York public figure.

== Inspiration for the film ==
One day in 1997, when Kristi Jacobson was working in the documentary division of ABC News, she glanced over a co-worker's shoulder and noticed Toots Shor's name in the New York Times crossword puzzle. Jacobson casually mentioned that Mr. Shor, the fabled New York saloonkeeper, was her grandfather. Embarrassed to admit that she didn't know much about her grandfather, Jacobson set out on a decade-long journey to immerse herself in the life and lore of Shor, the Runyonesque character who turned the role of restaurateur into a celebrity archetype, became a symbol of the city's midcentury apotheosis, and addressed everyone from bus drivers to film stars with his signature epithet, "crumb bum."

== Synopsis ==
The film identifies what were the markers of Toots' career as a celebrity restaurateur: Prohibition, the growth of the Mafia, the golden age of baseball, and the death of the saloon scene in the "serious" atmosphere created by the tumult of the 60s. Throughout the film, there is a feel of romantic nostalgia as all those who are interviewed recall Toots fondly as a lover of New York, at a moment when the city was awash in wealth and celebrity as never before, and that the city's sizzle was once embodied by a sports bar in Midtown: a place of glamour and egalitarianism, where Joe DiMaggio and Frank Sinatra and Ernest Hemingway rubbed elbows with working stiffs.

After deciding to pursue the project, she sent a fax to Walter Cronkite requesting an interview. Two days later Jacobson got a message: "Kristi, it's Walter Cronkite. I knew and loved Toots. What can I do to help you?"

Soon more friends and admirers of Shor were sitting in front of Jacobson's camera, recounting tales of boozy bonhomie: journalists (Gay Talese), broadcasters (Mike Wallace), athletes (Whitey Ford, Joe Garagiola). Tom Brokaw signed on as a consulting producer.

It turned out that the most difficult interviewee to nail down was her own mother, Kerry Jacobson, one of Shor's four children with his wife, the former Ziegfeld Follies dancer Marion Shor, known as Baby. In fact, her daughter's was the first interview Kerry Jacobson ever consented to oblige. "[Toots'] children were raised to keep their lives private, not to brag. It just wasn't [my mother's] instinct to talk about, you know, how her dad had turned up at her confirmation with John Wayne."

== Reviews ==
"Cheers to Ms. Jacobson for keeping alive the memory of New York nightlifes golden era, and a man who embodied it."
- Laura Kern, The New York Times

"Bottom Line: A glorious exercise in nostalgia. "Toots" affectionately and vividly recalls a bygone New York era, one in which life was simpler (if not more innocent, as one interview subject points out) and celebrities and ordinary folk could be in close proximity without hulking bodyguards getting in the way.
- Frank Scheck, The Hollywood Reporter

"A nostalgic, meticulously researched full course meal from granddaughter Kristi Jacobson that will whet appetites of fest, specialty and tube diners."
- Eddie Cockrell, Variety

3.5 out of 4 stars "Shor's granddaughter Kristi Jacobson has made an unexpectedly good documentary about this sentimental, volatile ex-bouncer's life and times unexpected, because Jacobson isn't afraid to paint her grandfather (who died, in 1977, when she was 6) as a complicated, reckless and hard-swigging dreamer."
- The Chicago Tribune
