= TO =

To, TO, or T.O. may refer to:

== Arts and entertainment ==
=== Film and television ===
- To (film), a 1964 Danish film
- To (anime), 2009

=== Games ===
- Tornado Outbreak, an action-adventure video game
- Tanki Online, a browser MMO game

=== Other media ===
- To (play), a Polish-language play by Czesław Miłosz
- Theatre of the Oppressed, originated by Augusto Boal
- "T.O.", a song by Lil Wayne from the album Funeral
- "To", a song by Sakanaction from Adapt (2022)

== Language ==
- To language
- To (kana), a Japanese syllabic character
- Tongan language ISO 639 alpha-2 language code

=== In English ===
- The grammatical particle to, used to form for example the infinitive
- To, a preposition

== Military use ==
- Officer in tactical command, or tactical officer
- Territorial Defense Forces (TO), a part of the armed forces of the former SFR Yugoslavia
- Tet Offensive, a campaign waged during the Vietnam War

== People ==
- To (surname), including To, Tô, and Tō, a group of surnames of east-Asian origin
- Tó, Portuguese nickname
- Tô, Vietnamese surname
- Terrell Owens, a retired American football wide receiver alternately known as "T.O."

== Places ==
- Thousand Oaks, California
- Tô Department, in Sissili Province of Burkina Faso, and the capital, Tô
- Tonga (ISO 3166-1 alpha-2 country code TO)
- Toronto, Ontario, Canada
- Province of Turin, Italy (sometimes abbreviated as TO—for example, on vehicle registration plates)

== Science and technology ==
=== Electronics and computing ===
- "Transistor Outline", as a naming component of semiconductor packages; see List of electronic component packaging types#Transistor, diode, small-pin-count IC packages
- .to, Tonga's Internet country code top-level domain
- Teraoctet (To), a unit of digital information equal to 10^{12} octets

=== Other uses in science and technology ===
- Takeoff, the phase of flight in which an aerospace vehicle or an animal goes from the ground to flying in the air
- Thermal oxidizer, a processing unit for air pollution control in many chemical plants

== Transportation ==
- President Airlines (IATA code TO), a former airline based in Phnom Penh, Cambodia
- Transavia France (IATA code TO), a low-cost airline operating as an independent part of the Air France-KLM group

== Other uses ==
- Tō, a Japanese pagoda
- Talk.Origins, a moderated Usenet discussion forum concerning the origins of life, and evolution

== See also ==
- T/O (disambiguation)
- Telephone operator (disambiguation)
- T and O map (orbis terrae), a type of medieval world map
