= Terminal Operating System =

Port cargo movement control system

A Terminal Operating System, or TOS, is a key part of a supply chain and primarily aims to control the movement and storage of various types of cargo in and around a port or marine terminal. The systems also enables better use of assets, labour and equipment, plan workload, and receive up-to-date information.

Terminal operating systems generally fall under one of two categories depending on supported cargo type, namely, containerized or non-containerized. Large container terminals typically require yard management functionality in a TOS, whereas bulk dry and liquid cargo terminals do not.

Terminal Operating Systems often use other technologies such as internet, EDI processing, mobile computers, wireless LANs and Radio-frequency identification (RFID) to efficiently monitor the flow of products in, out and around the terminal. Data is either a batch synchronization with, or a real-time wireless transmission to a central database. The database can then provide useful reports about the status of goods, locations and machines in the terminal.

The objective of a terminal operating system is to provide a set of computerized procedures to manage cargo, machines and people within the facility to enable a seamless link to efficiently and effectively manage the facility.

Terminal operating systems can be stand alone systems, managed as a service or use cloud technologies.

In its simplest form, the TOS can data track cargo in and out of a terminal.

== Functions ==
A Terminal Operating System may be used to do some or all of the following functions:

=== Shipping ===
Terminals requiring various types of ship transport
Container terminals using Containerization for LO-LO (lift on Lift Off) operations such as these require plans for efficiently loading and unloading Container ships docked within their Terminal.

A port using RO-RO ships require plans for efficiently loading automobiles, trucks, semi-trailer trucks, trailers or railroad cars that are driven on and off the ship on their own wheels.

=== Rail ===
Terminals that require the arrival and departure of cargo on trains such as container trains or bulk cargo.

=== Road ===
Handle the receival and release of Cargo for transshipment from other modes of transport or storage.

=== Yard management ===
Creating Shipping list or keeping track of Warehouse levels. Tracking machine moves around the terminal.

=== Invoicing/Reporting ===
Invoicing and providing reports for internal and external use.

=== Inventory ===
Keeping track of Inventory and storing its movements.

=== Cargo Type ===
Various types of cargo can be managed dependent of terminal type. This includes containers, dry bulk, liquid bulk, break bulk and vehicles (roll-on/roll-off).

== External Clients ==
Terminals may wish to communicate with the following through their Terminal Operating System:

- Terminal operators
- Freight forwarder
- Shipping line or shipping agent
- Container operators
- Port authority
- Pilots, tugs and mooring gang
- Cargo owner (e.g. oil companies)
- Customs office

== Vendors/Suppliers ==
There are several suppliers of Terminal Operating Systems available.

- Autostore TOS, TBA Group
- Cofano
- CommTrac
- ContPark
- TCS' DynaPORT
- GullsEye
- Hogia
- INFORM
- Infyz
- iPortman
- LynkGrid
- Mainsail
- MarineBerth
- Master Terminal
- Navis
- Octopi (by Navis)
- OPUS Terminal
- OSCAR
- Realtime Business Solutions (RBS)
- Solvo.TOS
- Softpak
- Tideworks

== See also ==
Electronic data interchange
