= Toots Shor =

American restaurateur (1903–1977)

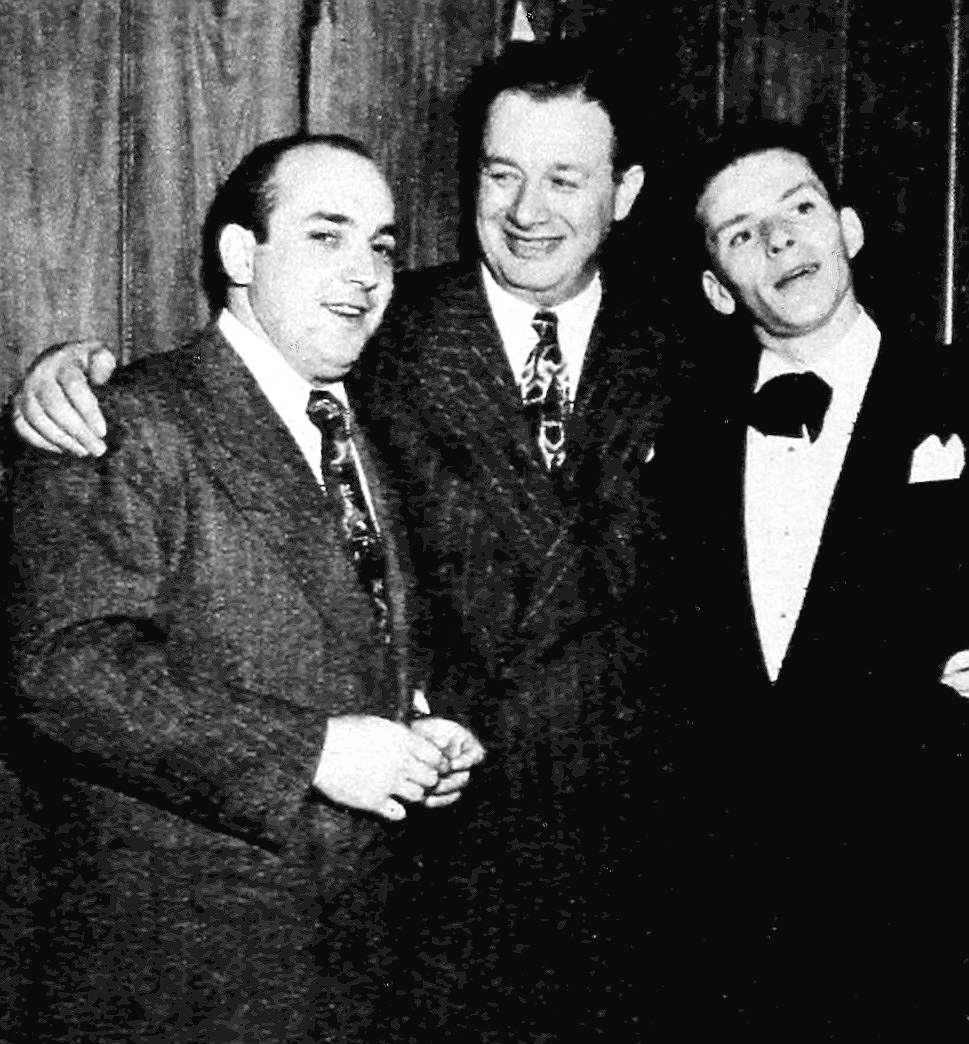
Hank Sanicola, Toots Shor, and Frank Sinatra in 1947

Bernard "Toots" Shor (May 6, 1903 – January 23, 1977) was an American bar owner and the proprietor of the saloon and restaurant Toots Shor's Restaurant, in Manhattan. He ran three establishments under that name, the first of which was located at 51 West 51st Street. He was a saloonkeeper, friend, and confidant to some of New York's biggest celebrities during that era.

== Early life ==
Shor was born in Philadelphia to Orthodox Jewish parents; his father of Austrian descent from Germany and his mother from Russia. He and his two older sisters were raised in a home above the family candy store in South Philadelphia. When Shor was 15 years old, his mother was killed by the driver of an automobile while she sat on the stoop outside their home. His father committed suicide five years later. Shor attended the Drexel Institute of Technology and the Wharton School of the University of Pennsylvania before working as a traveling shirt-and-underwear salesman.

== First restaurant ==
Shor went to New York City in 1930 and found employment as a bouncer at the Five O'Clock Club, which served as his introduction to celebrities. He later worked at several other nightspots: The Napoleon Club, Lahiff's Tavern, the Ball & Chain, the Madison Royale, and Leon & Eddie's. He became a man about town in Manhattan after opening his own restaurant, Toots Shor's, in 1940 at 51 West 51st Street with funding from Leo Justin, a New Jersey theater owner, who put up half of the $100,000 cost. The restaurant eventually expanded into 53 and 55 West 51st Street, doubling the size of the tavern, adding upstairs banquet rooms and a private projection room.

== Second restaurant ==
In September 1958, Shor sold the lease for his 51st Street restaurant for $1.5 million to William Zeckendorf but had until June 1959 to leave. In 1960, he opened at a new location at 33 West 52nd Street and tried to emulate the decor and atmosphere of the original. The then–Chief Justice, Earl Warren, considered Toots one of his closest friends. "The Chief" showed up to be photographed with a shovel full of dirt when Toots broke ground on Toots' 52nd street "joint".

== Third restaurant ==
In 1971, authorities padlocked the doors of the 52nd Street restaurant for nonpayment of federal, state, and local taxes totaling $269,516. 18 months later his restaurant at 5 East 54th Street opened.

== Personal life ==
Shor and his wife Marion ("Baby") lived for many years in a 12-room double apartment at 480 Park Avenue, where they raised their four children. One daughter, Tracey, was raised by Shor's friends, comedian Bob Hope and his wife Dolores.

During his final years, they lived at the Drake Hotel. Shor died at age 73.

Shor's financial affairs were usually shaky at best, thanks to a cavalier attitude toward the Internal Revenue Service, coupled with a generous nature; debts were frequently forgiven for friends who had fallen on hard times, and drinks and meals were comped on a regular basis.

Bob Broderick, long time friend and Manager of Toots Shor's, was quoted in the April 20, 1968 The Record: "Having Toots Shor for a friend and Margaret for a wife is about all a man can ask for out of this life."

Shor was an occasional guest on television programs, including What's My Line?, The Tonight Show Starring Johnny Carson, and The Red Skelton Show.

== In popular culture ==
In 1950, Shor was the subject of a three-part biography published in The New Yorker entitled "Toots's World", which was subsequently combined into a book. Twenty years later another biography, Toots, was written by Bob Considine. In 2006, the biographical documentary Toots, in which his granddaughter Kristi Jacobson profiled his life, premiered at the Tribeca Film Festival. It took "Best Film" at the National Baseball Hall of Fame and Museum's first annual film festival on November 12, 2006. Toots was released in 2007.

Shor was portrayed by Vlasta Vrána in Gleason, a 2002 television biopic about Jackie Gleason.

The J. Peterman Company sells the "Toots Shor Blouse" and "Toot's Shore Dress".

In S1, E2 of Mad Men, the character of Roger takes Don Draper and his wife Betty to Toots Shor, with Don naming the restaurant to his wife Betty on their ride home.
