= Toi (given name) =

Toi is a given name of the following notable people:

- toi8 (born 1976), Japanese artist
- Toi Aukuso Cain (1959–2009), Samoan politician
- Toi Cook (born 1964), American football player
- Toi Derricotte (born 1941), American poet
- Toi Hutchinson (born 1973), American politician
- Toi Inagawa (1940–2005), Japanese yakuza member
- Toi Kagami (born 1999) Japanese footballer
- Toy Kojima (born 1999) Japanese professional wrestler
- Toi Suzuki (born 1999) Japanese water polo player
- Toi Te Rito Maihi (1937–2022), New Zealand weaver, printmaker, painter, educator and writer.
- Sweet Tee (born Toi Jackson), American rapper
