= Toy (surname) =

- Language: Chinese, English, Turkish

Other names
- Variant forms: English: Toye; Chinese: Toi, Toye

Toy is a Chinese, English, and Turkish surname.

== Origins ==
As an English surname, Toy originated in two or three different ways. First, it was a nickname, either from Middle English toy "trifling thing; play, sport", or from Middle French toie "sheath". Second, it was a relational name, from the given name Toye (whose origin is not clear). Finally, it may have been a toponymic surname referring to a former settlement probably located in the East Riding of Yorkshire. Early records of the English surname Toy include a Robert Toy of Gainford in the patent rolls for 1339.

As a Chinese surname, Toy is a spelling, based on the pronunciation in different varieties of Chinese, of the following Chinese surnames, listed by their spelling in Hanyu Pinyin, which reflects the Standard Mandarin pronunciation:

- Cài (蔡), spelled Toy based on its Taishanese pronunciation. This is a toponymic surname referring to the state of Cai, adopted as a surname by some people of the state after its conquest by the state of Chu during China's Warring States period.
- Tái (邰), spelled Toy based on its mainstream Cantonese pronunciation (Jyutping: Toi4; Cantonese Yale: Tòih). According to the Shuowen Jiezi, the surname Tái originated as a toponymic surname referring to the city by the same name in modern-day Shaanxi.

Toy is also a Turkish surname, from toy "bustard".

== Statistics ==
According to statistics compiled by Patrick Hanks on the basis of the 2011 United Kingdom Census and the Census of Ireland 2011, there were 895 people on the island of Great Britain and five on the island of Ireland with the surname Toy as of 2011. The 1881 United Kingdom census found 1,095 people with the surname Toy in various places in England and Scotland, particularly in Cornwall.

The 2010 United States census found 5,784 people with the surname Toy, making it the 5,951st-most-common name in the country. This represented a slight increase from 5,730 people (5,567th-most-common) in the 2000 Census. In both censuses, roughly six-tenths of the bearers of the surname identified as non-Hispanic white, and slightly more than one quarter as Asian. It was the 616th-most-common surname among respondents to the 2000 Census who identified as Asian.

== People ==
- Barbara Toy (1908–2001), British writer
- Barry Toy (born 1939), Australian rules footballer
- Camden Toy (contemporary), American actor and script writer
- Carole Toy (1948–2014), Australian archer
- Crawford Howell Toy (1836–1919), American Hebrew scholar
- Emily Toy (born c. 1997), English amateur golfer
- Erol Toy (1936–2021), Turkish writer
- Fran Toy (1934–2024), American Christian priest
- Frederick E. Toy (1860s–1933), US Army soldier and recipient of the Medal of Honor
- Harry S. Toy (1892–1955), Michigan Attorney General and Michigan Supreme Court justice
- Hasan Toy (born 1994), Turkish kickboxer
- Humphrey Toy (1537–1577), British bookseller and publisher
- James C. Toy (1836–1889), American Civil War soldier and Virginia politician
- Jim Toy (1930–2022), American LGBT activist
- Jim Toy (baseball) (1858–1919), Native American baseball player
- Josh Toy (born 1992), Australian rules footballer
- Julie Furuta-Toy (born 1960), American diplomat
- Laura M. Toy (born 1951), American politician in Michigan
- Mark Toy (fl. 1987–present), United States Army major general
- Metin Toy (born 1994), Turkish volleyball player
- Noel Toy (birth name Ngum Yee Hom; 1918–2003), American burlesque performer
- Richard Toy (1911–1995), New Zealand architect
- Sam Toy (1923–2008), British industrialist and chairman of Ford Motor Company
- Virginia Toy (born 1979), New Zealand geologist
