= Toon =

Toon may refer to:

== Arts and entertainment ==
- Toon (TV series), a 2016 Dutch television series
- Toon (role-playing game), published by Steve Jackson Games
- Cartoon animation or toon, or its characters
  - Toon, in the 1988 film Who Framed Roger Rabbit

== Business ==
- Cartoon Network or Toon, an animation-oriented cable television network
- Toon Books an American comic book publisher
- Toon Studio, Disneyland Paris

== Places ==
- Newcastle upon Tyne (nickname: The Toon), England
- Stranraer (nickname: The Toon), Scotland
- Tōon, Ehime, a city, Ehime Prefecture, Japan
- Ferdows, a city in South Khorasan Province, Iran, formerly called Toon
- Toon, Somaliland, a town in the Garoodi region

== Science and technology ==
- Token-Oriented Object Notation, a data format
- Toon, trees of the genus Toona

== Other uses ==
- Toon (name), a list of people with the given name, nickname or surname
- Newcastle United F.C. (nickname: Toon), a professional association football club

== See also ==
- Toon Disney, a former pay TV channel
- Toon Express Group, a Hong Kong entertainment company
- Tōon-ryū, a style of karate
- Toonz, a 2D animation software program
- Tune (disambiguation)
